= List of B roads in Northern Ireland =

A List of B roads in Northern Ireland.

Routes are listed proceeding North to South or East to West as appropriate.

Road	From	To	Route
B1	A25 Market Street, Downpatrick	A2, junction of Strangford Road and Bath Street, Ardglass	St Patrick's Avenue/Killough Road/Ardglass Road/Downpatrick Road
B2	A28 in Loughgilly	East spur: A7 Belfast Road near Downpatrick; South spur: A28 Gosford Road near Mullaghmore	via Derrytrasna, Derryadd and Derrymacash to Lurgan, then: East spur: via Gamblestown, Dromore, Ballykeel, Ballynahinch and Annacloy; South spur: via Ballynaghy, Tandragee and Clare
B3	Border (continuing R214 from N2 Castleshane)	North spur: A26 at Lurgan; South spur: A25 at Rathfriland	via Derrynoose, Keady, Tassagh, Markethill, Tandragee, multiplexes with A51 to Gilford, then: North spur: via Bleary and Corcreeny; South spur: via Scarva and Loughbrickland
B4	A35 at Kesh	A505 at Cookstown	via Ederney, Lack, multiplexes with A32 to Omagh, Drumnakilly, Carrickmore and Pomeroy
B5	A20 Newtownards Road, Greyabbey	A2 Main Street, Ballywalter	Main Street/Church Street/Ballywalter Road/Greyabbey Road
B6	A49 near Lisburn	A22 at Killyleagh	via Saintfield, Darragh Cross, Raffrey, Derryboy and Shrigley
B7	A2 at Warrenpoint	B6 at Shrigley	via Burren, Mayobridge, Rathfriland, Ballyroney, Moneyslane, Lowtown, Finnis, Dromara, Ballynahinch, Listooder and Crossgar
B8	A25 near Newry	A25 near Kilcoo	via Mayobridge and Hilltown
B9	A26 near Waringstown	A3 at Magheralin	via Donaghcloney
B10	B3 at Scarva	A25 at Rathfriland	via Banbridge and Annaclone
B11 (defunct)	A2/B21 (now A48) in Donaghdee	A24 in Clough	Became a portion of the A2 after 1926.
B12	A52 at Crumlin	A3 at Lurgan	via Glenavy, Lower Ballinderry, Aghalee and Aghagallon Originally ran from the A26 in Glenavy to the A3 in Moira. Swapped with the A26 after the M1 was built; the southern end (at Moira) is now part of the B105 after it was bypassed.
B13 (defunct)	B39 at Clady Corner	A26 near Crumlin	Upgraded to the western half of the A52 in the late 1920s.
B14	A43 near Cargan	A2 at Cushendall	via Tully
B15	B16 near Ballymoney	A2 near Ballintoy	via Armoy, Ballycastle, Carnduff and Ballintoy
B16	B66 at Ballymoney	A44 near The Drones	via Dunaghy and Kilraghts
B17	A29 at Coleraine	A2 near Ballycastle	via Revallagh and Bushmills
B18	B73 at Coagh	A532 at Ballymena	via Moneymore, Loup, Drumenagh, Ballyronan, Toome, Moneyglass and Whiteside's Corner
B19 (defunct)	A26 in Ballymena	A6 in Maghera	Renumbered as a portion of the A42 in the mid 1920s.
B19 (defunct)	A2 north of Eglinton	Eglinton railway station	Declassified by the late 1940s.
B20	A2 at Craigavad	B21 at Bangor	via Crawfordsburn
B21	B20 at Bangor	A48 west of Donaghadee	Donaghadee Road/High Bangor Road Originally continued to the A2 in Donaghadee town center, but this became a portion of the A48 in the mid-1920s.
B22 (defunct)	A21 Zion Place, Newtownards	B21 at Donaghadee	Upgraded to the A48 in the mid-1920s.
B23	A49, junction of Sloan Street and Saintfield Road, Lisburn	A1, junction of Lisburn Road and Bradbury Place, Belfast	via Hillhall, Ballycarn and Ballylesson; Mercer Street/Hillhall Road/Ballylesson Road then Malone Road from its junction with Balmoral Avenue/University Road
B24 (defunct)	B6 in Lisburn	A6 in Ballynahinch	Upgraded to the A49 in the mid-1920s. After the A49 was rerouted due to completion of the M1, a 1 mile section west of the M1 became a portion of the B177 and the remainder declassified (now C297). Only the section in Ballynahinch is still part of the A49.
B25	A1 near Dromore	A2 at Rostrevor	via Katesbridge, Rathfriland and Hilltown
B26 (defunct)	A2 in Newcastle	A1 (now A26) in Banbridge	Upgraded to Class I status as a portion of the A50 in the mid-1920s.
B27	B8 at Hilltown	A2 at Kilkeel	
B28	A29 at Charlemont	A50 at Portadown	via Ardress and Drumharriff; Garvaghy Road
B29 (defunct)	A28 Scotch Street, Armagh	A27 in Tandragee	Upgraded to Class I status as a portion of the A51 in the mid-1920s.
B30	A25 near Camlough	Border (continues as R179 to Kingscourt)	via Lislea, Silverbridge, Creggan, Crossmaglen and Cullaville
B31	A29 at Armagh	A29 at Newtownhamilton	via Lisnadill
B32	B3 at Keady	Border (continues as R181 to R178 Shercock)	Castleblayney Road via Carnagh
B33 (defunct)	B3 near Derrynoose	Border at Bree (continued as the L145)	Became a portion of a rerouted B3 in the 1940s.
B34	A29 at Dungannon	B106 at Laghey Corner	Killyman Road
B35	A45 at Granville	A28 at Aughnacloy	via Carnteel and Greystone
B36	A34 at Donagh	Border (continues as R187 to N54 at Monaghan)	via Rosslea
B37 (defunct)	L24 (now N3) in Belleek	L24 (now N3) near Belturbet	Section north of Enniskillen was upgraded to Class I status as the A46 in the mid-1920s. The southern section remained a B-road because it did not lead to an approved border crossing, but it became the A509 in the 1960s.
B37 (defunct)	Central Belfast	A30 at Stonyford	Created in 1924 or 1925, despite the existence of the other B37. Upgraded to the A501 by the end of the 1920s.
B38	B12, junction of Main Street and Crumlin Road, Glenavy	A1, junction of Great Victoria Street and Fisherwick Place, Belfast	via Hannahstown; Belfast Road/Hannahstown Road/Upper Springfield Road then Springfield Road from its junction with West Circular Road/Grosvenor Road
B39	A26 Oldstone Road, Antrim	A6 Royal Avenue, Belfast	Seven Mile Straight/Ballyutoag Hill then Woodvale Road/Shankill Road/Peter's Hill/North Street
B40	B74 Main Street, Feeny	North spur: A6 Castledawson Roundabout near Castledawson; South Spur: A31 Moneymore Road Roundabout near Magherafelt	via Moneyneany, Draperstown and Desertmartin; Glenedra Road/Moneyneany Road/Derrynoyd Road/Magherafelt Road/Draperstown Road then Rosure Road/Desertmartin Road/Rainey Street: North spur: Broad Street/Church Street/Castledawson Road/Magherafelt Road; South Spur: Queen Street/Moneymore Road
B41	B40 Old Cross Roundabout, Draperstown	A29 Maghera Road, Tobermore	Tobermore Road/Draperstown Road/Main Street
B42	A6 Glenshane Road near Maghera	B40 junction of Desertmartin Road and Rainey Street, Magherafelt	via Lisnamuck and Tobermore; Lisnamuck Road then Magherafelt Road/Grange Road/Tobermore Road
B43	B4 at Pomeroy	A45 at Dungannon	via Donaghmore and Aghareaney
B44	B40 at Feeny	B74 near Feeny	Altinure Road
B45	A45 at Dungannon	Border (continues as R185 to N12 near Monaghan)	via Eglish and Caledon
B46	A5 at Newtownstewart	A32 at Enniskillen	via Gortin, Rousky, Creggan, Carrickmore, Sixmilecross, Beragh, Seskinore, Fintona, Dromore Trillick, Kilskeery and Ballinamallard
B47	B46 at Newtownstewart	B40 at Draperstown	via Plumbridge, Cranagh, Sperrin and Straw
B48	A5 at Newbuildings	A5 at Omagh	via Donemana, Ballynamallaght, Plumbridge and Gortin
B49	A5 at Strabane and Ballymagorry	B74 at Claudy	via Artigarvan, Donemana and Ballyneaner
B50	A5 Omagh western bypass	B72 at Castlederg	via Drumquin; originally continued north out of Castlederg to the L16 (now R235) at the border, but this was declassified after the mid-1970s.
~~B51~~			Unused
B52	A42 at Portglenone	A6 at Randalstown	via Chesney's Corner
B52	A46 at Belleek	A32 at Florencecourt	via Drumlisaleen, Garrison and Holywell; duplicate number. Originally ended at Belcoo, but was extended to Florencecourt in 2013.
B53	A6 at Randalstown	A36 at Moorfields	via Kells and Moorfields
B53	B52 at Garrison	Bridge over County River at border (becomes R282 to Manorhamilton)	
~~B54~~			Unused
B55 (defunct)	Portrush railway station	Portrush town center	Ran along Kerr Street; declassified after the A29 was rerouted.
B56	A57 near Ballyclare	A8 at Corr's Corner Roundabout	via Ballypalady
B57 (defunct)	A8 at Ballynure	A6 at Templepatrick	Upgraded to Class I status after the 1960s as the A57, probably due to construction of the N2.
B58	A8 at Ballynure	A2 at Carrickfergus	Carrickfergus Road/New Line Road/Prospect Road
B59	A36 at Ballymena	A2 at Whitehouse	via Doagh and Ballypalady
B60 (defunct)	A26 in Ballymena	A2 in Carnlough	Upgraded to Class I status as a portion of the A42 in the mid-1920s.
B61 (defunct)	B60 (now A42) in Ballymena	A2 at Glenariff	Upgraded to Class I status as a portion of the A43 in the mid-1920s.
B62	A2 at Portrush	A26 at Ballymena	via Ballybogy, Ballymoney, Finvoy, Rasharkin and Cullybackey
B63 (defunct)	A26 in Cloughmills	A2 at Ballycastle	Upgraded to Class I status as a portion of the A44 in the mid-1920s.
B64	A6 at Dungiven	A43 at Martinstown	via Brockagh, Garvagh, Kilrea, McLaughlin's Corner, Rasharkin, Glenvale, Glarryford, Clogh and Newtowncrommelin
B65 (defunct)	A29 in Coleraine	A6 east of Castledawson	Upgraded to Class I status as a portion of the A54 in the mid-1920s.
B66	A37 at Limavady	A2 at Bushmills	via Ringsend, Aghadowey, Agivey, Bendooragh, Milltown, Ballymoney, Dervock, Derrykeighan and Castlecat
B67	A29 at Coleraine	A44 at Ballycastle	via Ballybogy, Derrykeighan, Toberdoney, Moss-Side and The Dry Arch
B68	B69 at Limavady	A6 at Dungiven	via Scriggan
B69	B74 at Claudy	A2 near Bellarena	via Crindle
B70	B66 at Ringsend	B62 near Rasharkin	via Ballerin; multiplexes with B64 from Garvagh to McLaughlin's Corner
B71 (defunct)	A2 Craigavon Bridge near Derry	Border at Killea	Much of route upgraded to Class I status as a portion of the A40 in the mid-1920s. The section running to Killea was bypassed and declassified, but it became a portion of the B193 a few years later.
B72	A5 at Strabane	B82 near Killadeas	via Victoria Bridge, Erganagh, Castlederg, Castlegore, Killen and Ederney
B73	A29 at Cookstown	Lough Neagh at Moortown	via Drummullan and Coagh
B74	A6 near Claudy	A6 at Dungiven	via Claudy, Craigdarragh and Feeny
B75	A29 near Maghera	B64 at Kilrea	via Upperlands
B76	M1 J10 near Lurgan	B2 Derrymacash Road	Kinnego Embankment
B77	A29 at Armagh	A4 at Portadown	via Loughgall
B78	A50 at Portadown	A29 at Newtownhamilton	via Teemore, Mullaghbrack, Markethill and Clady Milltown
B79	Bridge Street, Newry	Merchant's Quay, Newry	Dominic Street/Patrick Street/Upper Edward Street/Corry Square
B80	A4 at Enniskillen	B46 at Fintona	via Garvary, Tempo and Imeroo
B81	A46 near Derrygonnelly	A4 near Enniskillen	via Derrygonnelly and Monea
B82 (defunct)	A32 near Enniskillen Airport	A35 south of Kesh	Renumbered as an eastern extension of the A47 in 2013.
B83	A5 at Omagh	Border (continues as R186 to N54 Monaghan)	via Seskinore, Eskra and Clogher
B84	A5 at Newtownstewart	A32 at Dromore	via Drumquin and Milltown
B85	B165 at Clady	B72 at Strabane	Urney Road
B86	B66 at Dervock	B67 at Toberdoney	Toberdoney Road
~~B87~~			Unused
B88 (defunct)	B126 North Queen Street, Belfast	A2 York Street, Belfast	Frederick Street; now part of the A11.
~~B89~~			Unused
B90	A8 at Mossley	near Ballylumford	via Greenisland, Ballycarry and Ballylumford
~~B91~~			Unused
B92	A2 Loughareema Road	A2 Tromra Road	via Cushendun
B93	B52 at Randalstown	A26 at Cloughmills	via Whiteside's Corner, Ahoghill, Cullybackey, Craigs and Glarryford
B94	A26 at Cloughmills	B95 at Ballyclare	via Cloughmills, Clogh, McGregor's Corner, Quarrytown, Broughshane and Five Corners
B95	B518 at Antrim	North spur: M2 Junction 6; South spur: A8 near Mossley; East spur: B58 near Straid	via Parkgate, Doagh and Straid
B96	B64 at Rasharkin	B93 at Cullybackey	via Aughnacleagh, Portglenone and Dreen
B97	A42 at The Sheddings	A2 at Glenarm	Munie Road/Straidkelly Road
B98	A26 near Ballymena	B59 at Chapeltown	via Kells, Connor
B99	B58 near Straid	A2 at Glynn	via Ballynure
B100	B99 near Glenoe	A8 at Kilwaughter	Ballyrickard Road
B101	A26 Nutts Corner Roundabout	A30 Lisburn	via Dundrod and Hillview
B102	A512 at Derriaghy	A501 Falls Road, Belfast	Stewartstown Road/Andersonstown Road/Falls Road
B103	A1 at Lambeg	B23 at Drumbeg	Ballyskeagh Road
B104	B12 at Lower Ballinderry	A3 Moira Road, Lisburn	via Upper Ballinderry and Ballymave
B105	B12 at Aghalee	A3 at Moira	Soldierstown Road/Station Road
B106	B128 at Benburb	North spur: A45 at Coalisland; South spur: B196 at Tamnamore	via Moy, Laghey Corner and Kingave
B107	B80 near Tempo	A4 at Fivemiletown	via Clabby
B108	A32 Swanlinbar Road	A509 Derrylin Road	via Kinawley
B109 (defunct)	A2 in Clandeboyle	A48 at Six Road Ends	Declassified by the late 1940s.
B110 (defunct)	A28 east of Caledon	A3 in Middletown	Renumbered to B210 by the mid-1940s for unknown reasons.
B111	B77 at Loughgall	A51 at Hamiltonsbawn	via Richhill
B112	B133 Millvale Road	A25 Camlough Road	through Bessbrook
B113	B134 at Forkhill	A1 at Newry	via Dromintee and Meigh
B114	B3 near Markethill	A27 at Poyntzpass	Tannyoky Road via Eleven Lane Ends and Loughgilly
B115	B45 near Benburb	A29 Railway Street, Armagh	Battleford Road
~~B116~~			Unused
B117 (defunct)	Bessbrook	Newry	
B118	A6 near Drumahoe	A2 near Eglinton	via Eglinton
B119	A2 near Castlerock	A2 near Castlerock	Spur off the A2 to Castlerock
~~B120~~			Unused
B121 (defunct)	B43 in Donaghmore	A4 in Parkanaur	Declassified by the 1940s.
B122	B83 near Omagh	A4 at Fivemiletown	via Fintona
B123	A32 at Irvinestown	B46 at Kilskeery	Old Junction Road
B124 (defunct)	A25 west of Newry	B78 in Markethill	The section from Newry to Enagh is now part of the B133, the section from Whitecross to Markethill is now part of the B134, and the central section declassified (later C214).
B125 (defunct)	A2 in Donard Park, Newcastle	A50/T2 in Newcastle	Now part of the A2 one-way system.
B126	A1, junction of College Square East and Wellington Place, Belfast	A2 York Road, Belfast	College Square East/College Avenue/Millfield/Carrick Hill/North Queen Street
B127	A34 at Lisnaskea	Border (continues as R205 to R199 near Newtowngore)	-
B128	A5 at Aughnacloy	A29 near Allistragh	via Benburb and Blackwatertown
~~B129~~			Unused
B130	B45 at Greystone	B128 at Benburb	Derryfubble Road
B131	B106 at Tamnamore	B3 near Clare	via Kilmore, Richhill and Milltown
B132	A3 near Middletown	A29 at Keady	Madden Road
B133	A28 at Markethill	A25 at Bessbrook	via Mountnorris
B134	B78 near Markethill	B113 at Forkhill	via Whitecross, Lislea and Mullaghbawn
B135	A29 near Newtownhamilton	B30 at Crossmaglen	via Cullyhanna
B136	A47 near Boa Island	Border (continues to R232 at Pettigo)	-
~~B137~~			Unused
B138 (defunct)	B37 in Bellanaleck	Bridge over the Cladagh River	Declassified by 1946 (now C438). A 1939 map shows the route ending at the Cladagh River, but this is probably a map error and the route likely continued to the border with County Cavan near Belcoo. If this is the case, the western end is now part of the B52.
~~B139~~			Unused
B140	B80 near Tempo	B514 at Ballindarragh	via Lisbellaw
B141 (defunct)	B140 northeast of Lisbellaw	B80 south of Tempo	Now part of a rerouted B140.
B142 (defunct)	B108 southeast of Kinawley	B37 (now A509)	Declassified by 1946 (now C434).
B143	A34 at Newtownbutler	L2101 in Summerhill	via Magheraveely; originally continued to the B36 west of Rosslea, but this section was downgraded in 2013 and is now the C707.
~~B144~~			Unused
B145	A2 near Portballintrae	A2 near Bushmills	through Portballintrae
B146	A2 at Bushmills	A2 at Dunseverick	via Giant's Causeway
B147	B62 at Ballymoney	A2 near Bushmills	via Kirkhills, Stranocum, The Dry Arch and Lagavara; and Causeway Road via Dunseverick
B148	A8 near Larne	A2 at Drumnagreagh Port	via Carncastle
B149	A2 at Kilroot	B99 Glenoe	via Beltoy
B150	A2 at Whitehead	B90 at Mullaghboy	via Ballystrudder
~~B151~~			Unused
B152 (defunct)	A6 High Street, Antrim	A6/A26 in Antrim	via Antrim railway station; declassified after the 1970s.
B153 (defunct)	B95 near Parkgate	A26 in Aldergrove	via Dunadry; reduced to a spur by 1946, running from the then-B101 (now A26) to an unclassified road near Killead. The western end is now gone, lost under Belfast International Airport while the remainder is now part of the A57. Much of the route was declassified (now C110).
B154	A52 near Dundrod	B38 near Hannahstown	via Dundrod
B155 (defunct)	A52 Nutts Corner Road northeast of Crumlin	A26 Crumlin Road north of Crumlin	Declassified in the 1970s, probably when the A26 was rerouted.
B156	B12 at Aghagallon	B12 at Glenavy	via Gawley's Gate
~~B157~~			Unused
B158	B4 at Omagh	B46 at Beragh	Donaghanie Road
~~B159~~			Unused
B160	B4 at Pomeroy	A31 at Magherafelt	via Stewartstown, Coagh, Ballinderry and Ballyronan
B161	B520 at Coalisland	B160 at Derrycrin	via Killeen, Mourne View and The Diamond
B162	B40 near Moneyneany	A29 at Cookstown	via Labby and Churchtown
B163 (defunct)	A32 (now B46) north of Trillick	A5 at Curr	Declassified by 1946.
B164	B72 near Spamount	B164 at Newtownstewart	via Ardstraw
B165	B85 at Clady	A5 at Newtownstewart	via Kennystown, Victoria Bridge and Douglas Bridge
B166 (defunct)	B50 (now unclassified) Kilclean Road in Castlederg	L16 at Grousehall	Declassified by 1946 (now C675).
~~B167~~			Unused
B168	B122 in Fintona	A4 in Clogher	
~~B169~~			Unused
B170	B505 Holywood Road, Belfast	A2 Belfast Road near Bangor	Belmont Road/Ballymiscaw Road/Whinney Hill/Craigantlet Road/Ballysallagh Road
~~B171~~			Unused
B172	A48 at Newtownards	A2 at Millisle	Movilla Road/Ballyblack Road East/Moss Road
B173	A20 at Kircubbin	A2 at Cloghy	via Rubane
~~B174~~			Unused
B175	A24 at Ballynahinch	A25 at Annsborough	via Spa and Drumaroad
B176	A25 at Downpatrick	A2 to Killough	via Ballygilbert
B177	A1 at Hillsborough	A49 at Ballynahinch	via Annahilt
B178	B177 at Hillsborough	A21 near Comber	via Carryduff and Moneyrea
~~B179~~			Unused
B180	B27 at Hilltown	North spur: A2 at Dundrum; South spur: A2 at Newcastle	via Bryansford
B181	B160 near Magherafelt	Coagh	via The Loup
B182	A42 at Gulladuff	A6 near Toome	via Bellaghy
B183	A6 at Randalstown West junction	A6 at Drumderg Roundabout, Toome	Moneynick Road
~~B184~~			Unused
B185	A2 in Portstewart	A29 in Coleraine	
B186	A37 at Macosquin	B66 at Ringsend	Cashel Road
B187 (defunct)	A29 in Coleraine	B66 in Aghadowey	Declassified by 1946, but returned to Class II status as a portion of the B207.
B188	B66 at Aghadowey	B207 at Aghadowey	Ballygawley Road
B189 (defunct)	A2 in Portrush	B17 in Coleraine	Paralleled the A29; declassified in the early 1930s (now C535).
B190	B70 at Ringsend	B64 at Garvagh	Belraugh Road
~~B191~~			Unused
B192	B69 at Limavady	A6 at Dungiven	Drumrane Road
B193	A40 at Nixons Corner	Border at Killea (continues as R237 to N13)	-
B194	A2 Buncrana Road, Derry	B521 Glengalliagh Park, Derry	Racecourse Road
B195 (defunct)	Blacklion	Mucklagh	Became a portion of the A52 in 2013.
B196	B106 at Tamnamore	M1 Junction 12	via Mullenakill, Maghery and The Birches
B197	A2 Main Street, Bangor	B511 Groomsport Road, Bangor	Hamilton Road/Ballyholme Road/Ballyholme Esplanade/Sheridan Drive
B198	A2 Belfast Road, Holywood	A2 Bangor Road, Holywood	Holywood High Street
~~B199~~ - ~~B200~~			Unused
B201	A2 near Limavady	A29 at Coleraine	Windyhill Road, Carthall Road
B202	A2 near Balarena	Magilligan Point	Point Road
~~B203~~ - ~~B204~~			Unused
B205	B23 Ballylesson Road, Drumbeg	B23/A55 Milltown Road	Purbysburn Hill/Hospital Road
B206 (defunct)	A4 in Enniskillen	A32 in Drumcoo	Not shown on the 1926 or 1929 maps, but was in existence by 1946, probably gaining its number upon completion. Now upgraded to a portion of the A32.
B207	A29 at Ballylintagh	A54 at Agivey	Moneybrannon Road/Mullaghinch Road
B208 (defunct)	B205 in Newtownbreda	Shaw's Bridge, B23	Upgraded to a portion of the A55.
~~B209~~			Unused
B210	A28 at Caledon	A3 at Middletown	Coolkill Road
B500 (defunct)	Antrim Road, Belfast	Woodvale Road, Belfast	Became a portion of the A52 in the mid-1920s.
B501	A55 North Circular Road, Belfast	A2, junction of York Road and York Street, Belfast	Cavehill Road/Limestone Road
B502	A55 Ballysillan Road, Belfast	A501, junction of Falls Road and Divis Street, Belfast	Oldpark Road/Agnes Street/Northumberland Street
B503	B126, junction of College Avenue and College Square East, Belfast	A1 Lisburn Road, Belfast	College Square North/Durham Street/Sandy Row
B504 (defunct)	B503 Sandy Row, Belfast	A42 Ormeau Road, Belfast	Declassified after the 1960s.
B505	Woodstock Road, Belfast	A55, junction of Holywood Road and Parkway, Belfast	Beersbridge Road/Holywood Road
B506	A23 Short Strand, Belfast	A24 Ormeau Road, Belfast	Short Strand/Ravenhill Road
B507	A2 Branch Roundabout, Derry	A2 Carlisle Circus, Derry	Branch Road/Northland Road/Francis Street/Fahan Road/Lecky Road/Barrack Street/Abercorn Road
B508 (defunct)	A2 at the Craigavon Bridge, Derry	B71 in Derry	The section along Abercorn Street is now part of a rerouted B507 and the remainder unclassified.
~~B509~~			Unused
B510 (defunct)	B69 south of Crindle	Limavady Junction railway station	Declassified in 1976 after the station closed.
B511	B21 Donaghadee Road, Bangor	A2 junction of Donaghadee Road and Groomsport By-Pass, Groomsport	Groomsport Road/Bangor Road/Main Street/Donaghadee Road
~~B512~~			Unused
B513	A6 Antrim Road, Whitehouse	A2 Shore Road, Whiteabbey	O'Neill Road/Station Road
B514	A4 at Tamlaght	A34 at Lisnaskea	via Carry Bridge and Drumbughas North; formerly a portion of the A34 before it was rerouted over the A39 to Maguiresbridge.
~~B516~~			Unused
B517	A29 Moy Road, Moygashel	B34 Killyman Road, Laghey Corner	Far Circular Road
B518	A26 Ballymena Road, Antrim	A6 Belfast Road, Antrim	Stiles Way/Ballycraigy Road
~~B519~~			Unused
B520	A29 at Cookstown	A45 at Coalisland	via Tullyhogue and Stewartstown
B521	A2 Branch Roundabout, Derry	A515 Madam's Bank Road, Derry	Glengalliagh Road
B522	B521 Glengalliagh Road, Derry	A2 Branch Roundabout, Derry	Templemore Road
B523	A2 Limavady Road, Derry	A6 Glendermott Road, Derry	Clooney Terrace/Simpson's Brae and Irish Street/Belt Road
B524	B507 Northland Road, Derry	A2 Buncrana Road, Derry	Lone Moor Road/Infirmary Road/Clarendon Street
B525	B507 Northland Road, Derry	A2 Buncrana Road, Derry	Duncreggan Road/Pennyburn Pass
B526	B194 Racecourse Road, Derry	A2 Culmore Road, Derry	Greenhaw Road
B527	B507 Northland Road, Derry	B507 Lecky Road, Derry	Springtown Road/Creggan Road/Great James Street/Little James Street/Rossville Road
B528	A2 Foyleside Roundabout, Derry	Whittaker Street, Derry	Foyle Street
B529	B524 Infirmary Road, Derry	B527 Little James Street, Derry	Great James Street
B530	A6 Glendermott Road, Derry	A514 Crescent Link, Derry	Rossdowney Road
~~B531~~			Unused
B532	M2 J7 (Crosskennan Junction), Antrim	B518 Stiles Way, Antrim	Bush Road
B533	A34 at Newtownbutler	A3 (N54) at Wattlebridge	The entire stretch of the B533 is officially called the Wattlebridge Road. It formerly formed part of the main road from Enniskillen to Dublin, via Cavan Town. Formerly a portion of the A34 before it was rerouted towards Clones.
B534	B82 at Lisnarick	A32 at Irvinestown	Lisnarick Road
B535	B80 at Tempo	A4 at Maguiresbridge	-
B536	B72 at Strabane	B47 at Plumbridge	-
~~B537~~ - ~~B539~~			Unused
