= Donnygowen =

Townland in County Tyrone, Northern Ireland

Donnygowen is a townland in County Tyrone, Northern Ireland. It is situated in the historic barony of Strabane Lower and the civil parish of Urney and covers an area of 53 acres. The village of Clady is situated in the townlands of Clady and Donnygowen.

The name derives from the Irish: dun na n-gabhann (Fort or dun of the smiths).

The population of the townland declined during the 19th century:

Year	1841	1851	1861	1871	1881	1891
Population	34	42	17	15	12	18
Houses	6	7	3	3	3	3

== See also ==
- List of townlands of County Tyrone
