= Fort-town =

Townland in County Tyrone, Northern Ireland

Fort-town is a townland in County Tyrone, Northern Ireland. It is situated in the historic barony of Strabane Lower and the civil parish of Urney and covers an area of 57 acres.

Census information from 1841 to 1891 inclusive records zero population and housing.

== See also ==
- List of townlands of County Tyrone
