= Kennystown, County Tyrone =

Townland in County Tyrone, Northern Ireland

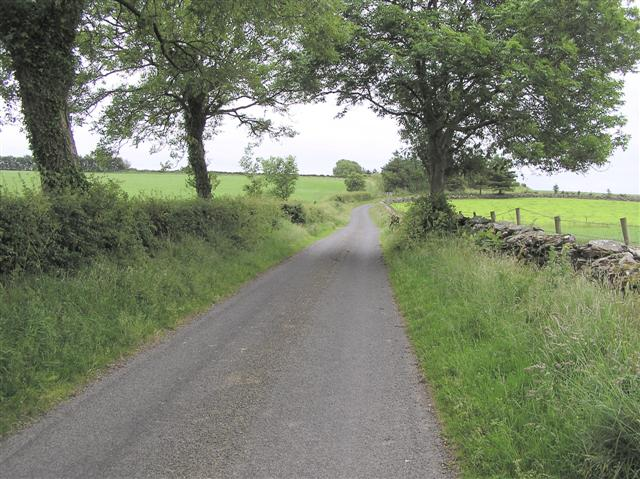
Kennystown townland in 2006

Kennystown is a townland in County Tyrone, Northern Ireland. It is situated in the historic barony of Strabane Lower and the civil parish of Urney and covers an area of 102 acres.

The population of the townland declined during the 19th century:

Year	1841	1851	1861	1871	1881	1891
Population	50	14	24	12	28	20
Houses	8	2	6	3	4	3

== See also ==
- List of townlands of County Tyrone
