= Urney Glebe =

Townland in County Tyrone, Northern Ireland

Urney Glebe is a townland in County Tyrone, Northern Ireland. It is situated in the historic barony of Strabane Lower and the civil parish of Urney and covers an area of 124 acres.

The population of the townland declined during the 19th century:

| Year | 1841 | 1851 | 1861 | 1871 | 1881 | 1891 |
|---|---|---|---|---|---|---|
| Population | 32 | 30 | 27 | 26 | 4 | 6 |
| Houses | 8 | 6 | 3 | 5 | 6 | 1 |

The townland contains one Scheduled Historic Monument: an Ecclesiastical site and cross carved slab: Ernaidhe (grid ref: H3034 9491).

== See also ==
- List of townlands of County Tyrone
- List of archaeological sites in County Tyrone
