= Bullock Park =

Townland in County Tyrone, Northern Ireland

Coordinates: 54.652423°N 7.573078°W

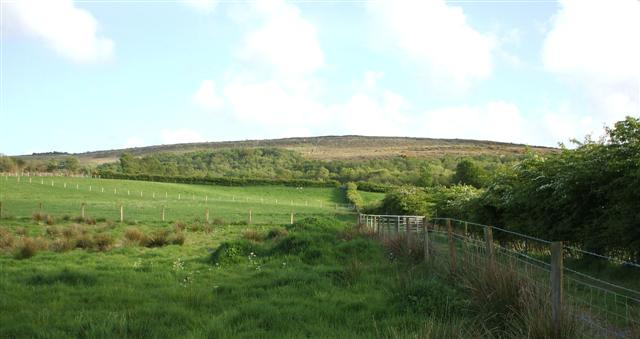
- Bullock Park in 2007

- Location within Northern Ireland
- County: County Tyrone
- Country: Northern Ireland
- Sovereign state: United Kingdom
- Postcode district: BT
- Dialling code: 028
- UK Parliament: West Tyrone

Bullock Park is a townland in County Tyrone, Northern Ireland. It is situated in the historic barony of Omagh West and the civil parish of Longfield West and covers an area of 398 acres.

The population of the townland increased slightly overall during the 19th century:

Year	1841	1851	1861	1871	1881	1891
Population	67	59	55	41	56	74
Houses	10	10	9	9	9	12

The townland contains one Scheduled Historic Monument: a Portal tomb (grid ref: H2778 7892).

== See also ==
- List of townlands of County Tyrone
- List of archaeological sites in County Tyrone
