= Gallany, County Tyrone =

Townland in County Tyrone, Northern Ireland

Gallany is a townland in County Tyrone, Northern Ireland. It is situated in the historic barony of Strabane Lower and the civil parish of Urney and covers an area of 296 acres.

The population of the townland declined during the 19th century:

Year	1841	1851	1861	1871	1881	1891
Population	175	95	71	62	65	63
Houses	32	17	13	12	12	14

== See also ==
- List of townlands of County Tyrone
