= Castlesessagh =

Coordinates: 54.7083°N 7.5934°W

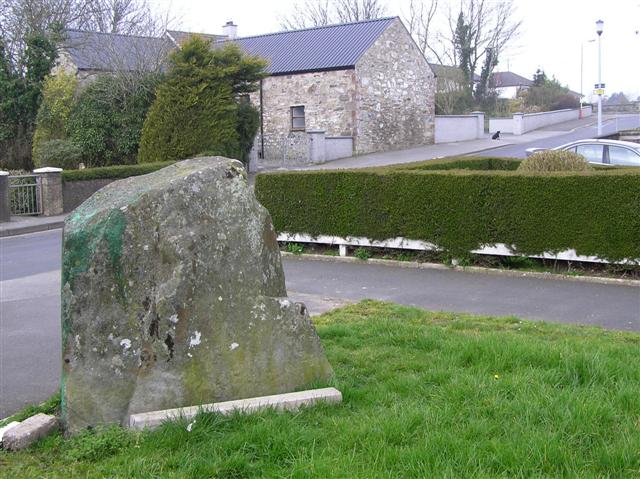
- Standing stone in the eastern part of Castlesessagh

- Location within Northern Ireland
- Population: 165 (2008 estimate)
- Irish grid reference: H262845
  - Belfast: 85 miles
- District: Strabane
- County: County Tyrone
- Country: Northern Ireland
- Sovereign state: United Kingdom
- Post town: CASTLEDERG
- Postcode district: BT81
- Dialling code: 028, +44 28
- UK Parliament: West Tyrone
- NI Assembly: West Tyrone

Castlesessagh is a townland of 165 acres (67.53 ha) in County Tyrone, Northern Ireland. It is situated in the civil parish of Urney and the historic barony of Omagh West. Parts of the town of Castlederg are located in this townland.

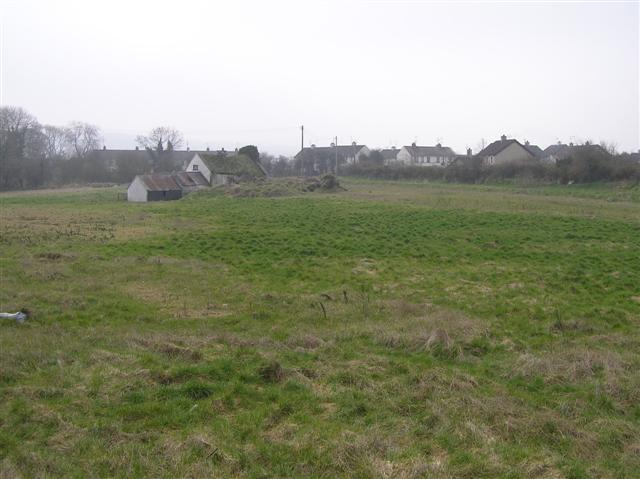
Rough ground in the southern part of Castlesessagh

== See also ==
- List of townlands of County Tyrone
