= Carrigullin =

Townland in County Tyrone, Northern Ireland

Carrigullin is a townland in County Tyrone, Northern Ireland. It is situated in the historic barony of Strabane Lower and the civil parish of Camus and covers an area of 497 acres.

The name derives from the Irish: Carraig Gobhlain (Rock of the fork).

The population of the townland declined during the 19th century:

Year	1841	1851	1861	1871	1881	1891
Population	144	114	116	84	108	99
Houses	27	21	21	17	17	18

== See also ==
- List of townlands of County Tyrone
