= Scotstown, County Tyrone =

Coordinates: 56°43′N 5°34′W

Scotstown
- Townland
- Country: Northern Ireland
- Sovereign state: United Kingdom
- Police: Northern Ireland
- Fire: Northern Ireland
- Ambulance: Northern Ireland

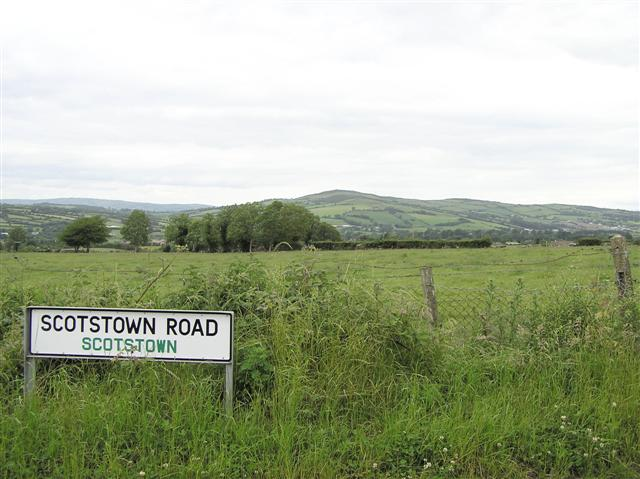
Scotstown townland in 2006

Scotstown is a townland in County Tyrone, Northern Ireland. It is situated in the historic barony of Strabane Lower and the civil parish of Urney and covers an area of 84 acres.

The population of the townland declined during the 19th century:

Year	1841	1851	1861	1871	1881	1891
Population	73	44	25	25	37	29
Houses	13	8	7	9	7	7

== See also ==
- List of townlands of County Tyrone
