= Hunterstown, County Tyrone =

Townland in County Tyrone, Northern Ireland

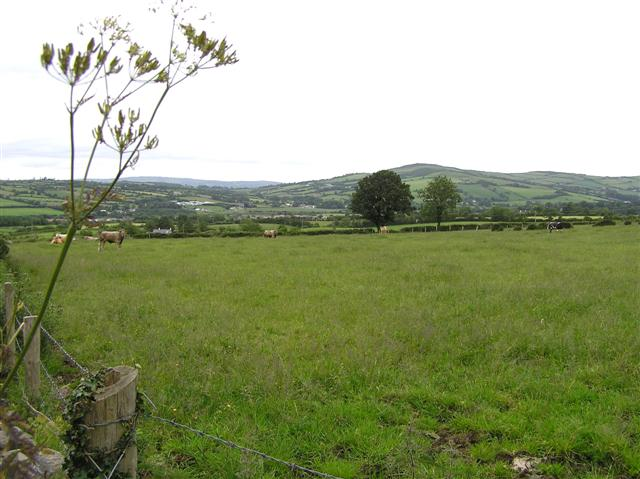
Hunterstown townland in 2006

Hunterstown is a townland in County Tyrone, Northern Ireland. It is situated in the barony of Strabane Lower and the civil parish of Urney and covers an area of 37 acres.

The population of the townland declined during the 19th century:

| Year | 1841 | 1851 | 1861 | 1871 | 1881 | 1891 |
|---|---|---|---|---|---|---|
| Population | 22 | 51 | 12 | 14 | 10 | 11 |
| Houses | 3 | 8 | 3 | 3 | 3 | 3 |

== See also ==
- List of townlands of County Tyrone
