= Ballycolman =

Coordinates: 54°48′51″N 7°28′07″W

Ballycolman: Irish: Baile Uí Colmain
- Townland
- Location within Northern Ireland
- District: County Tyrone
- Country: Northern Ireland
- Sovereign state: United Kingdom
- Police: Northern Ireland
- Fire: Northern Ireland
- Ambulance: Northern Ireland

Ballycolman (Irish: Baile Uí Colmain ) is a townland of 588 acres in County Tyrone, Northern Ireland, now part of Strabane. It is situated in the historic barony of Strabane Lower and the civil parish of Urney.

The name derives from the Irish: Baile Uí Colmain (Colman's town).

The population of the townland declined during the 19th century:

Year	1841	1851	1861	1871
Population	304	392	249	181
Houses	59	79	52	43

It was then subsumed into Strabane. It is best known for Ballycolman housing estate in Strabane, and also has a community centre, nursery school and industrial estate.

== See also ==
- List of townlands of County Tyrone
