= Mount Bernard =

Townland in County Tyrone, Northern Ireland

Mount Bernard is a townland in County Tyrone, Northern Ireland. It is situated in the barony of Omagh West and the civil parish of Urney and covers an area of 50 acres.

The population of the townland declined slightly during the 19th century:

Year	1841	1851	1861	1871	1881	1891
Population	14	12	8	6	10	13
Houses	2	2	2	2	2	2

== See also ==
- List of townlands of County Tyrone
