= Liggartown =

Townland in County Tyrone, Northern Ireland

Liggartown is a townland in County Tyrone, Northern Ireland. It is situated in the barony of Strabane Lower and the civil parish of Urney and covers an area of 261 acres.

Liggartown is one of three townlands which meet in the centre of the village of Sion Mills, the others being Seein and Ballyfatten. Herdmans Mill, around which the village was built, is in Liggartown, and was preceded on the site by a corn mill which was mentioned in the 1640 Civil Survey as part of the Abercorn estate.

The population of the townland declined during the 19th century:

Year	1841	1851	1861	1871	1881	1891
Population	540	44	70	53	56	57
Houses	47	8	12	7	10	9

== See also ==
- List of townlands of County Tyrone
