= Tullymoan =

Townland in County Tyrone, Northern Ireland

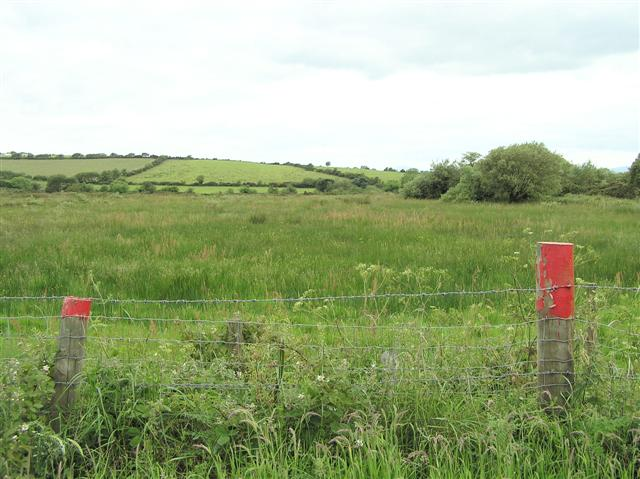
Tullymoan townland in 2006

Tullymoan is a townland in County Tyrone, Northern Ireland. It is situated in the historic barony of Strabane Lower and the civil parish of Urney and covers an area of 381 acres.

The name is thought to derive from the Irish: Tulaigh Móna, i.e. 'the mossy hill(s)'.

The population of the townland declined during the 19th century:

Year	1841	1851	1861	1871	1881	1891
Population	107	68	61	64	67	65
Houses	17	14	13	13	15	13

== See also ==
- List of townlands of County Tyrone
