= Flushtown =

Townland in County Tyrone, Northern Ireland

Coordinates: 54.809°N 7.509°W

Flushtown is a townland in County Tyrone, Northern Ireland. It is situated in the historic barony of Strabane Lower and the civil parish of Urney and covers an area of 116 acres (0.181 mi^{2}).

The population of the townland declined during the 19th century:

| Year | 1841 | 1851 | 1861 | 1871 | 1881 | 1891 |
|---|---|---|---|---|---|---|
| Population | 40 | 31 | 29 | 14 | 14 | 2 |
| Houses | 7 | 5 | 5 | 3 | 3 | 3 |

== See also ==
- List of townlands of County Tyrone
