= Carrickone =

Townland in County Tyrone, Northern Ireland

Carrickone is a townland in County Tyrone, Northern Ireland. It is situated in the historic barony of Strabane Lower and the civil parish of Urney and covers an area of 73 acres.

The population of the townland declined during the 19th century:

Year	1841	1851	1861	1871	1881	1891
Population	63	30	35	27	31	13
Houses	9	4	6	5	7	2

== See also ==
- List of townlands of County Tyrone
