= R235 road (Ireland) =

Road in Ireland

Coordinates: 54.776009°N 7.599402°W

R235 road
- Bóthar R235
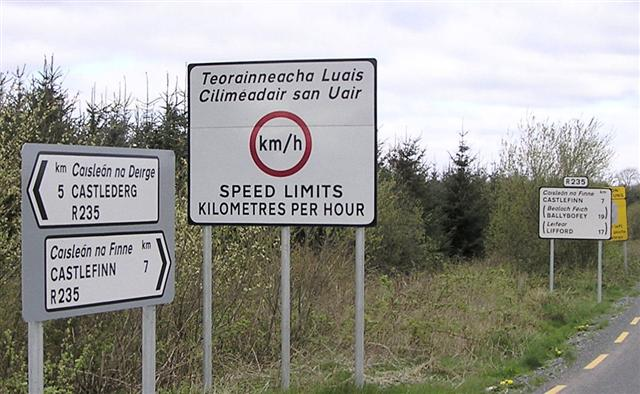
- Beginning of the R235 at the border

Route information
- Length: 7.3 km (4.5 mi)

Major junctions
- From: N15 Castlefin
- To: Irish border Alt Upper

Location
- Country: Ireland

Highway system
- Roads in Ireland; Motorways; Primary; Secondary; Regional

The R235 road is a regional road in Ireland, located in east County Donegal. It runs from Castlefin to the border. On the Northern Ireland side, it continues as the B50 road to Castlederg, County Tyrone.
