= Dartans =

Townland in County Tyrone, Northern Ireland

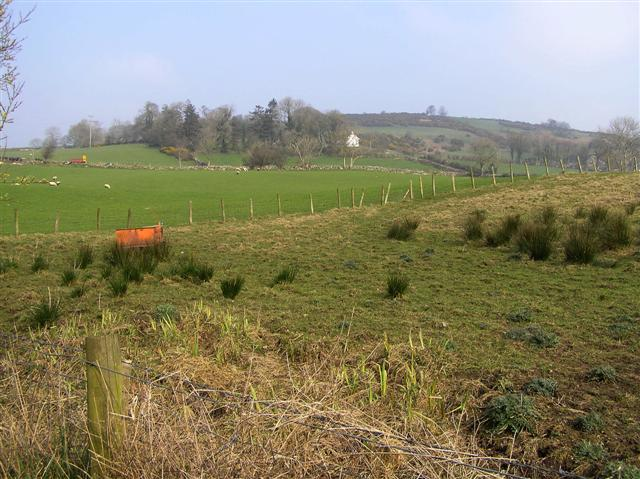
Dartans townland in 2007

Dartans is a townland in County Tyrone, Northern Ireland. It is situated in the barony of Omagh West and the civil parish of Urney and covers an area of 367 acres.

The name derives from the Irish: dartan (A place where cows or herds graze) or dartain (Knolls or hillocks).

The population of the townland declined during the 19th century:

Year	1841	1851	1861	1871	1881	1891
Population	108	109	106	110	93	78
Houses	19	18	19	20	17	15

== See also ==
- List of townlands of County Tyrone
