= Dooish =

Village in County Tyrone, Northern Ireland

Coordinates: 54°35′20″N 7°29′30″W

Dooish: Irish: Dubhais
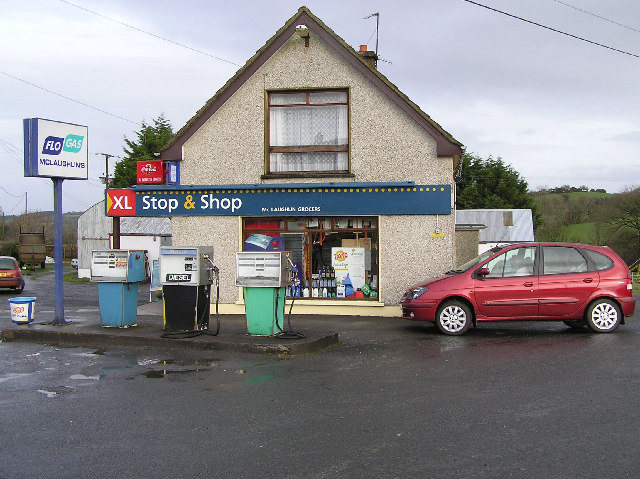
- Country store in Dooish
- County: County Tyrone
- Country: Northern Ireland
- Sovereign state: United Kingdom
- Postcode district: BT78
- Dialling code: 028

Dooish (Irish: Dubhais, meaning 'black hill-base') is a village and townland near Drumquin in County Tyrone, Northern Ireland. The townland is situated in the historic barony of Omagh West and the civil parish of Longfield West and covers an area of 845 acres. In the 2001 census it had a population of 93 people. It lies within the Omagh District Council area.

The population of the townland declined during the 19th century:

Year	1841	1851	1861	1871	1881	1891
Population	293	252	240	181	169	171
Houses	56	52	52	41	45	42

== See also ==
- List of townlands of County Tyrone
