= Rabstown =

Townland (administrative unit) in County Tyrone, Northern Ireland

Coordinates: 54.7786°N 7.5095°W

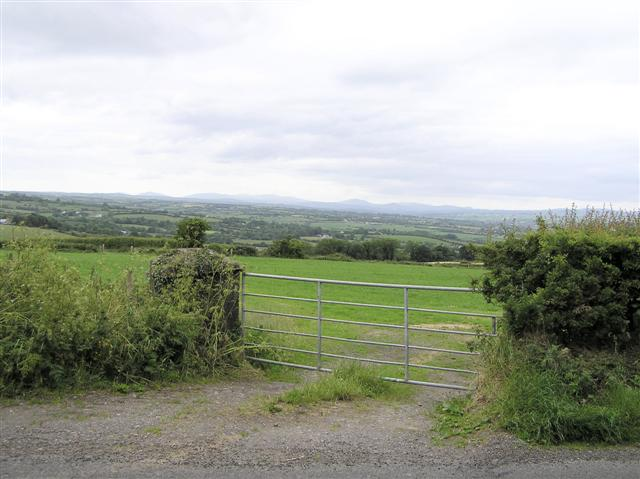
Rabstown townland in 2006

Rabstown is a townland in County Tyrone, Northern Ireland. It is situated in the historic barony of Strabane Lower and the civil parish of Urney and covers an area of 206 acres.

The population of the townland declined during the 19th century:

Year	1841	1851	1861	1871	1881	1891
Population	91	65	60	55	64	60
Houses	20	15	12	12	15	15

== See also ==
- List of townlands of County Tyrone
