= Longfield West =

- County: County Tyrone
- Country: Northern Ireland
- Sovereign state: United Kingdom
- Postcode district: BT
- Dialling code: 028

Longfield West is a civil parish in County Tyrone, Northern Ireland. It is situated in the historic barony of Omagh West.

== Civil parish of Longfield West ==
The civil parish includes the villages of Dooish, Drumquin and Killen.

== Townlands ==
The civil parish contains the following townlands:

- Aghakinmart
- Ally
- Annaghalough
- Barravey
- Billary
- Bomackatall Lower
- Bomackatall Upper
- Bullock Park
- Carradoo Glebe
- Carradowa Glebe
- Carrick
- Carrickaness
- Carrickbwee Glebe
- Castlecraig
- Cavansallagh
- Clunahill Glebe
- Collow
- Coolavannagh
- Cornashesk
- Curragh Glebe
- Curraghamulkin
- Curraghmacall
- Dooish
- Drumgallan
- Drummenagh
- Drumnamalra
- Drumowen
- Drumquin
- Drumscra
- Dunnaree
- Ednashanlaght
- Garrison Glebe
- Gortnasoal Glebe
- Hill Head
- Killen
- Killoan
- Kilmore (Irvine)
- Kilmore (Robinson)
- Kirlish
- Lackagh
- Lisky Glebe
- Marrock Glebe
- Meenacloy
- Meenadoan
- Meenaheery Glebe
- Meenbog
- Meencargagh
- Meenmossogue Glebe
- Prughlish
- Sloughan
- Tully
- Tullyard
- Willmount

== See also ==
- List of townlands in County Tyrone
- List of civil parishes of County Tyrone
