= R177 road (Ireland) =

Road in Ireland

R177 road
- Bóthar R177
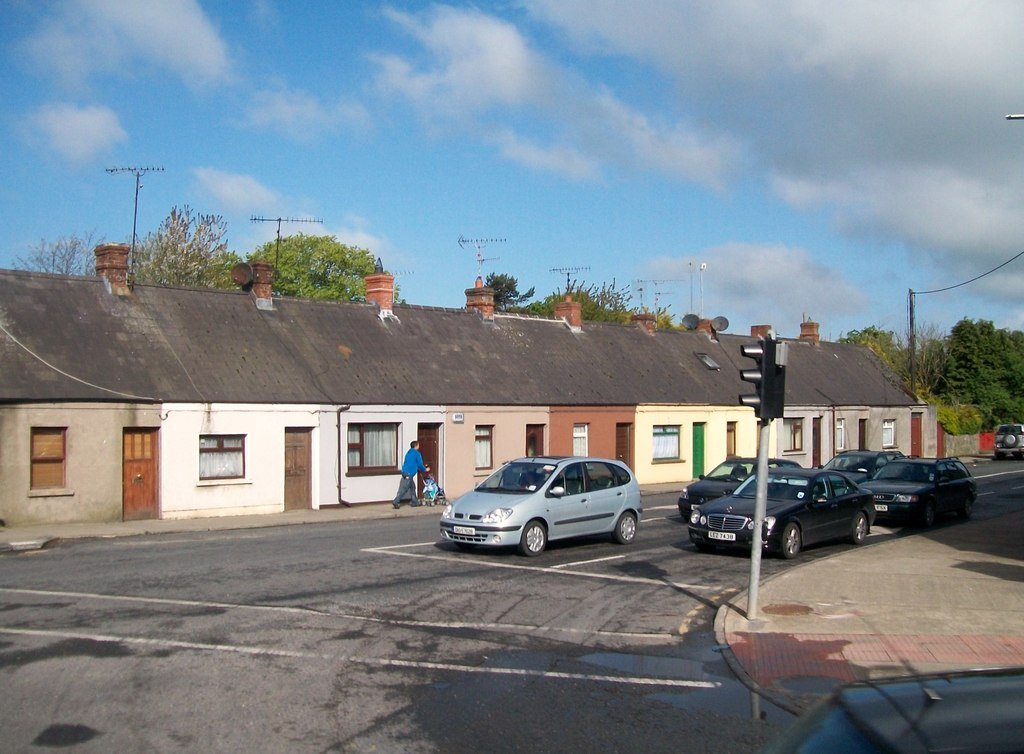
- Armagh Road, Dundalk, on the R177

Route information
- Length: 5.5 km (3.4 mi)

Location
- Country: Ireland
- Primary destinations: County Louth; leaves the R132 at Lisdoo; crosses the M1 at Carn More; Terminates at the Republic of Ireland–United Kingdom border at Carrickedmond

Highway system
- Roads in Ireland; Motorways; Primary; Secondary; Regional

The R177 road is a regional road in Ireland linking Dundalk and the Border with Northern Ireland in County Louth. The road continues as the A29 across the border in Northern Ireland. The road is 5.5 km (3.4 mi) long.

== See also ==
- Roads in Ireland
- National primary road
- National secondary road
