= Peacockbank =

Peacockbank may refer to:

- Peacockbank, County Tyrone, a townland in County Tyrone, Northern Ireland
- Barony of Peacockbank, a historic barony in East Ayrshire, Scotland
