= Erganagh =

Townland in County Tyrone, Northern Ireland

Coordinates: 54°43′03″N 7°33′00″W

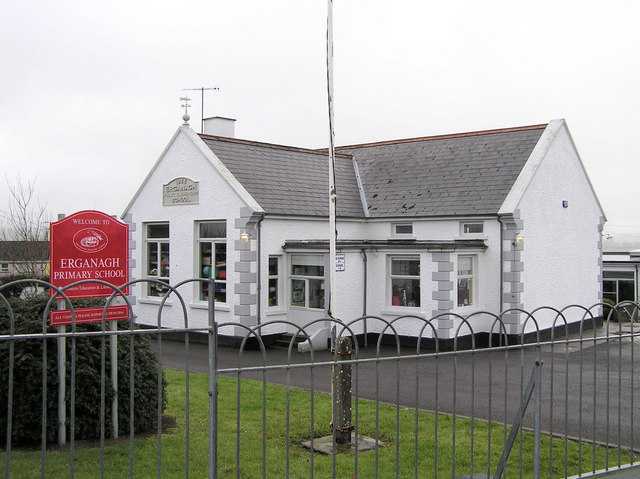
Erganagh Primary School

Erganagh (likely from Irish Earganach) is the name of a small village and of a townland (of 498 acres) near Castlederg in County Tyrone, Northern Ireland. It is situated in the historic barony of Strabane Lower and the civil parish of Ardstraw. In the 2001 census it had a population of 366 people. It is within the Strabane District Council area.
