= Peacockbank, County Tyrone =

Peacockbank
- Townland
- Country: Northern Ireland
- Sovereign state: United Kingdom
- Police: Northern Ireland
- Fire: Northern Ireland
- Ambulance: Northern Ireland

Peacockbank is a townland in County Tyrone, Northern Ireland. It is situated in the historic barony of Strabane Lower and the civil parish of Urney and covers an area of 154 acres.

The population of the townland declined during the 19th century:

Year	1841	1851	1861	1871	1881	1891
Population	54	56	33	34	44	29
Houses	10	9	7	7	7	6

== See also ==
- List of townlands of County Tyrone
