= R214 road (Ireland) =

Road in Ireland

R214 road
- Bóthar R214
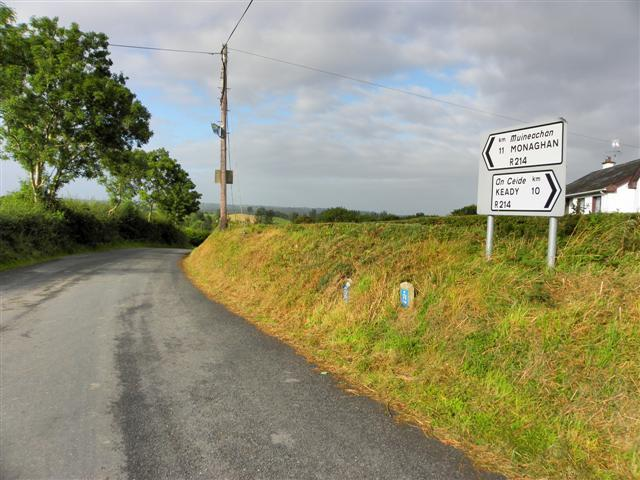
- R214 at Drumbeo, County Monaghan

Route information
- Length: 4.2 km (2.6 mi)

Location
- Country: Ireland
- Primary destinations: County Monaghan; leaves the N2 road near Castleshane; terminates at the Republic of Ireland–United Kingdom border

Highway system
- Roads in Ireland; Motorways; Primary; Secondary; Regional

The R214 road is a regional road in Ireland which links Castleshane with the Republic of Ireland–United Kingdom border, after which the road becomes the B3 in County Armagh. The road is 4.2 km (2.6 mi) long.

== See also ==
- Roads in Ireland
- National primary road
