= Mollie McGeown =

Northern Irish nephrologist and biochemist

Mary Graham McGeown
- Born: 19 July 1923; Aghagallon, County Antrim, Northern Ireland
- Died: 21 November 2004 (aged 81); Belfast, Northern Ireland
- Education: MD, Queen's University Belfast, 1950; PhD, biochemistry, 1953
- Known for: Established first dialysis unit in Northern Ireland
- Scientific career
- Fields: Nephrology, biochemistry
- Institutions: Belfast City Hospital

Mary Graham "Mollie" McGeown CBE (19 July 1923 – 21 November 2004) was a Northern Irish nephrologist and biochemist. She was a pioneer in dialysis and kidney transplantation, overseeing the first dialysis centre in Northern Ireland and designing the "Belfast recipe" for post-transplantation care.

== Early life and education ==
Mollie McGeown was born in 1923 in Aghagallon, County Antrim, and was raised on her family's farm. She attended Lurgan College and enrolled at Queen's University Belfast in 1940 to study medicine, graduating with honours in 1946. She studied for an MD under the supervision of pathologist John Henry Biggart, completing her degree in 1950. Biggart refused to employ her in a permanent position because she was a married woman. She was denied a post at the Royal Belfast Hospital for Sick Children for the same reason, so instead she decided to complete a PhD in biochemistry with a thesis on phosphate esterases in milk. She was awarded a PhD in 1953, as well as a five-year Medical Research Council research fellowship at the Royal Victoria Hospital, Belfast.

== Career ==
She developed an international reputation for her research work, which covered calcium metabolism, hyperparathyroidism, and kidney stone disease.

In 1959, McGeown was chosen to set up and run Northern Ireland's first dialysis unit at the Belfast City Hospital. She had no formal training with the new technology, so she and her colleagues taught themselves how to use the new dialysis machines. She and her team developed what became known as the "Belfast recipe", a management protocol for patients who had received kidney transplants to reduce the high level of mortality from infections. The protocol, which mandated the use of low-dose corticosteroid therapy and a return to dialysis if the transplant failed, produced an 80% cumulative graft five-year survival rate.

Throughout her career, she authored 350 journal articles, numerous book chapters, and guidelines for kidney transplantation. She served as president of the Renal Association and chairman of the UK Transplant Management Committee, and was elected Fellow of the Royal College of Physicians in 1978 and Fellow of the Royal College of Physicians of Ireland in 1982.

McGeown retired in 1988. She died on 21 November 2004 in Belfast, aged 81.

== Awards and honours ==
She received numerous honours, most notably a CBE in the 1985 New Year's Honours. She also received two gold medals from the Royal College of Physicians of Ireland in 1987, a professorial fellowship from Queen's University in 1988, and honorary doctorates from the New University of Ulster in 1983 and Queen's University in 1991. In 1998, on the 50th anniversary of the National Health Service, she was named as one of the 50 women who had contributed most to the success of the NHS. The same year, she was also honoured with a Festschrift in Nephrology Dialysis Transplantation.
