= Edenderry, County Tyrone =

Coordinates: 54.589°N 7.203°W

Edenderry: Irish: Éadan Doire
- Village
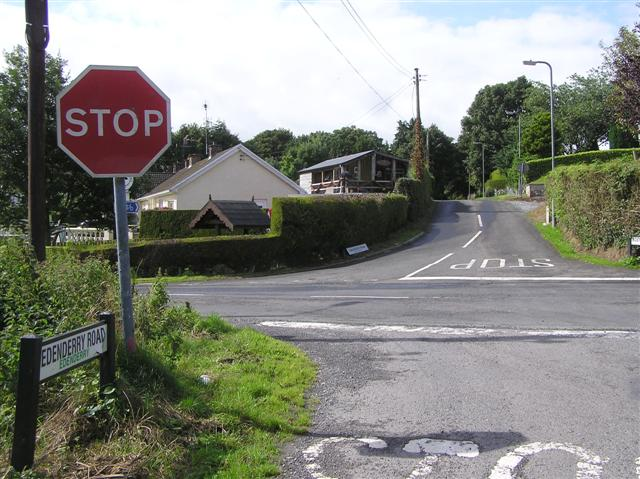
- Crossroads of Edenderry Road and Donaghanie Road (B158)

- Location within Northern Ireland
- Population: 84
  - Belfast: 51 mi (82 km)
  - Dublin: 94 mi (151 km)
- District: Fermanagh and Omagh
- County: County Tyrone
- Country: Northern Ireland
- Sovereign state: United Kingdom
- Post town: OMAGH
- Postcode district: BT79
- Dialling code: 028
- Police: Northern Ireland
- Fire: Northern Ireland
- Ambulance: Northern Ireland
- UK Parliament: West Tyrone
- NI Assembly: West Tyrone

Edenderry (from Irish Éadan Doire, meaning 'hill-brow of the oak-grove') is a small village and townland in County Tyrone, Northern Ireland. In the 2001 Census it had a population of 84. It is within the Fermanagh and Omagh District Council area and lies on the north bank of the Camowen River. The townland is traversed by the B158 road.
