= Churchtown, County Tyrone =

Townland in County Tyrone, Northern Ireland

Coordinates: 54.7083°N 7.5934°W

Churchtown: Irish: Baile an Teampaill
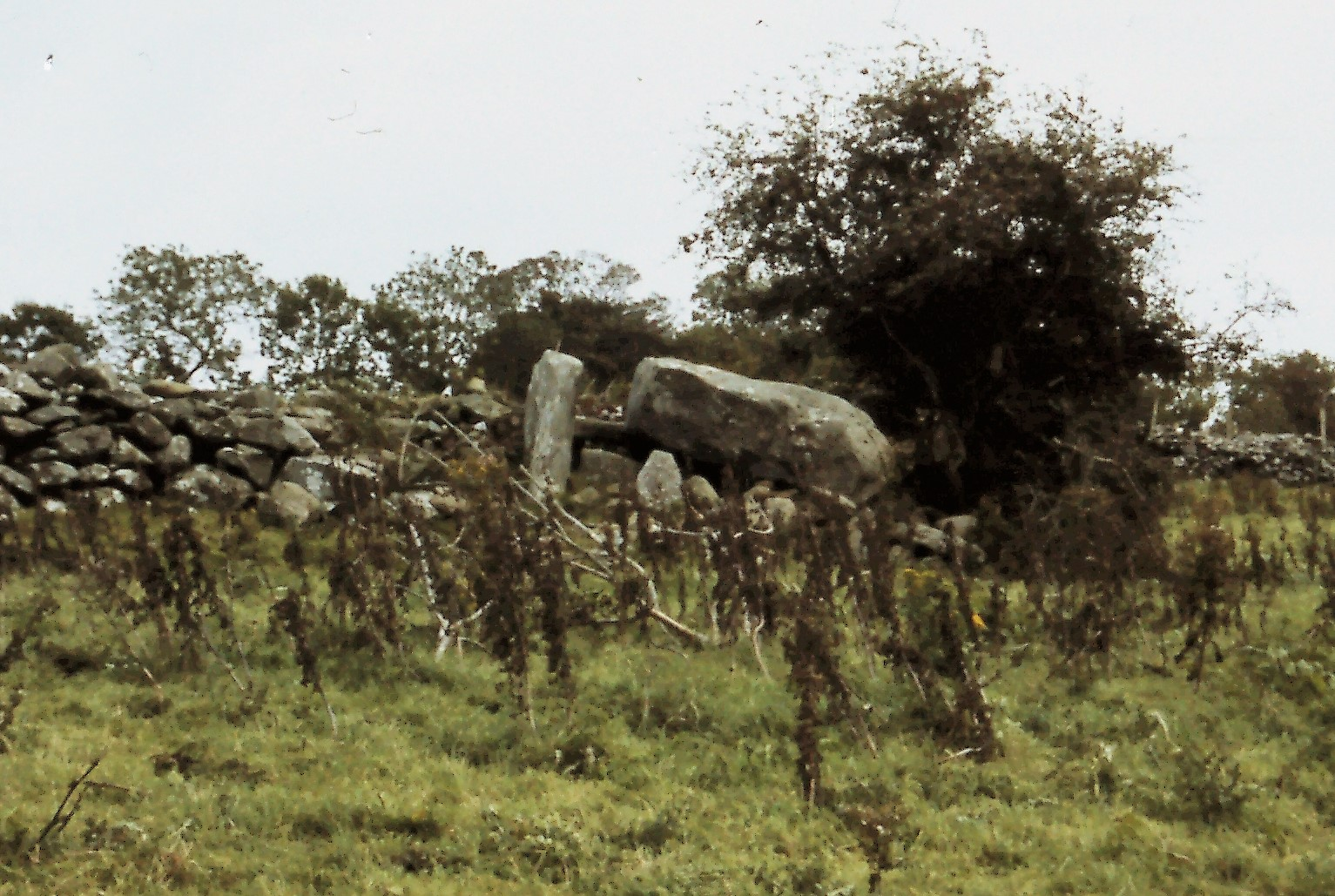
- Portal tomb near Castlederg

- Location within Northern Ireland
- Irish grid reference: H262845
  - Belfast: 85 miles
- District: Strabane
- County: County Tyrone
- Country: Northern Ireland
- Sovereign state: United Kingdom
- Post town: CASTLEDERG
- Postcode district: BT81
- Dialling code: 028, +44 28
- UK Parliament: West Tyrone
- NI Assembly: West Tyrone

Churchtown is a townland in County Tyrone, Northern Ireland. The town of Castlederg is located within this townland. Many local places and organisations are named after the townland such as the Churchtown Community Centre, Churchtown Football Club and Churchtown Park.

== Historic sites ==
Two megalithic tombs are known within the townland, a wedge tomb called "Todd's Den" and a portal tomb called "Druid's Altar".
