= Sidney Elisabeth Croskery =

Sidney Elisabeth Croskery OBE (26 January 1901 – 1990) was an Irish medical doctor, traveller and writer who spent almost twenty-seven years in Arabia treating illnesses, particularly blindness, and establishing ante-natal services.

== Life ==
Sidney Elisabeth Croskery was born in Gortgranagh, Killinure, County Tyrone. Her parents were Derry-born James Croskery, an ordained Minister of the Presbyterian Church in Ireland, and Mildred Jane Croskery (née Wallace), a medical doctor who had qualified in Edinburgh, though she did not practise.

When she was three years old her father died suddenly and the family had to leave their country house (Mountjoy Manse) and move to Belfast. She and her elder sister Lilian were educated at Victoria College Kindergarten and Princess Gardens School in Belfast.

Following their mother's example, both young women went on to study medicine at the University of Edinburgh. In 1924 Sidney Elisabeth Croskery was awarded the Wellcome Prize in the History of Medicine for her essay on “The history of the development of our knowledge regarding internal secretion”. She obtained the Edinburgh M.D. three years later.

Croskery worked at the Coombe Women & Infants University Hospital in Dublin.

From 1927 to 1939, Croskery joined her sister working as a GP in Tunbridge Wells. During this time she became a member of the Society of Friends because she was a pacifist. She said in later life that she had decided to become a medical missionary at the age of seven.

In 1939, Eleanor Petrie, a doctor working in Sana'a, in the Yemen, as part of the British Medical Mission to Yemen, asked Croskery to take her place for nine months or so while she was on leave. Croskery accepted the invitation. She worked as a doctor in Bayhan and Aden, particularly on eye diseases and maternity and ante-natal treatment. She was responsible for the health of the Sultan's harem and that of their children; rickets was a particular problem.

However, due to the outbreak of war, Croskery was not allowed to return home until April 1945. After the war, she returned to Aden to continue her medical work, but, due to a serious attack on a colleague, felt compelled to resign her position. Over the following years, until she left Aden in 1967, she worked in different parts of Arabia, concentrating on surveying, treating and preventing blindness as a representative of the British Empire Society for the Blind (later the Royal Commonwealth Society for the Blind). This work was unpaid. She also worked as medical officer for Aden Port Trust Family Clinic, and served with the Church of Scotland Medical Mission in Yemen.

Even after her "official" retirement Croskery spent four winters in remote parts of the Yemen, treating people with trachoma.

After Croskery finally retired she returned to live in Belfast, where her married sister and family still lived, to be joined later by Lilian.

She was awarded the Order of the British Empire for public service in Aden.

Croskery donated a collection of antiquities from Yemen to the British Museum, and some coins to the Ulster Museum.
