= Urney, County Tyrone =

Townland and civil parish in County Tyrone, Northern Ireland

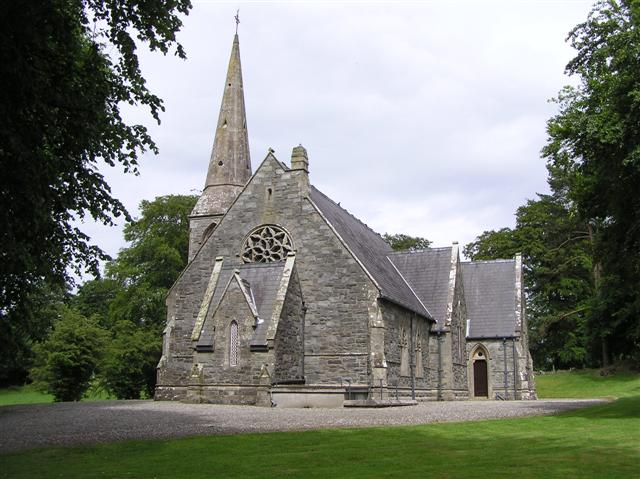
Christ Church (Church of Ireland), Urney, in 2006

Urney (Irish: An Urnaí, meaning 'Place of Prayer') is a townland (of 188 acres) and civil parish in County Tyrone, Northern Ireland. Both townland and parish are situated in the historic barony of Strabane Lower. It lies within the Derry City and Strabane area.

Urney is notable as being the first manufacturing location of Urney Chocolates, established in 1919.

It was also the birthplace of William Burke, notorious for the Burke and Hare murders.

== Civil parish of Urney ==
=== Townlands ===
The civil parish of Urney contains the following townlands:

=== B ===
Backtown, Ballycolman, Ballyfatten, Ballylennan Scott, Bellspark, Berrysfort, Bridgetown

=== C ===
Carricklee, Carrickone, Castlegore, Castlesessagh, Castletown, Cavan, Churchtown, Clady, Craigmonaghan (Nelson), Creevy Lower, Creevy Upper

=== D ===
Dartans, Donnygowen, Drumeagle

=== F ===
Flushtown, Fort-town, Freughlough

=== G ===
Gallany, Ganvaghan Kyle, Glebe, Glebe (Old), Glentimon, Glentown, Gortlogher

=== H ===
Hunterstown

=== I ===
Ichenay, Ichenny Upper, Inisclan

=== K ===
Kennystown, Kilclean, Kilcroagh, Kinkit

=== L ===
Learmore, Liggartown, Lisdoo

=== M ===
Magheragar, Magirr, Mount Bernard, Munie

=== P ===
Peacockbank, Prospect, Pullyernan

=== R ===
Rabstown

=== S ===
Scotstown, Seein, Skerryglass, Somervillestown, Stephenstown

=== T ===
Tullydoortans, Tullymoan, Tullywhisker

=== U ===
Urney, Urney Glebe

== Townland of Urney ==
The townland is situated in the Barony of Strabane Lower and the civil parish of Urney and covers an area of 188 acres.

The population of the townland declined slightly during the 19th century:

Year	1841	1851	1861	1871	1881	1891
Population	55	30	23	31	36	54
Houses	12	7	7	6	7	12

== See also ==
- List of civil parishes of County Tyrone
- List of townlands of County Tyrone
