= Killen, County Tyrone =

Coordinates: 54.6756°N 7.6249°W

Killen: Irish: Cillín
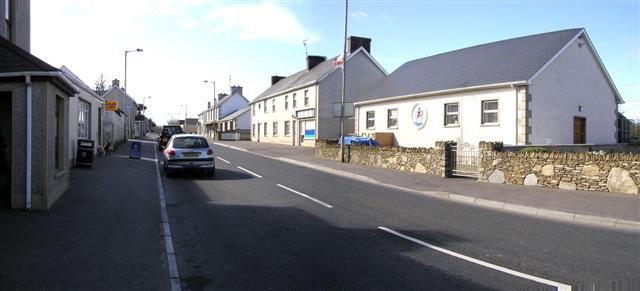
- Main Street in Killen.

- Location within Northern Ireland
- Population: 231 (2001 Census)
- Irish grid reference: H240806
  - Belfast: 87 miles
- District: Strabane
- County: County Tyrone
- Country: Northern Ireland
- Sovereign state: United Kingdom
- Post town: CASTLEDERG
- Postcode district: BT81
- Dialling code: 028, +44 28
- UK Parliament: West Tyrone
- NI Assembly: West Tyrone

Killen (from Irish Cillín, meaning 'little church') is a small village and townland (of 356 acres) in County Tyrone, Northern Ireland. It is several miles southwest of Castlederg, on the road leading south over Scraghy Mountain. A short distance to the west lies County Donegal, in the Republic of Ireland. It is situated in the civil parish of Longfield West and the historic barony of Omagh West. In the 2001 Census it had a population of 231 people.

In recent years, Killen Creamery has been turned into a community centre and business centre.
