= A29 road (Northern Ireland) =

Road in Northern Ireland

Coordinates: 55.199°N 6.654°W

A29

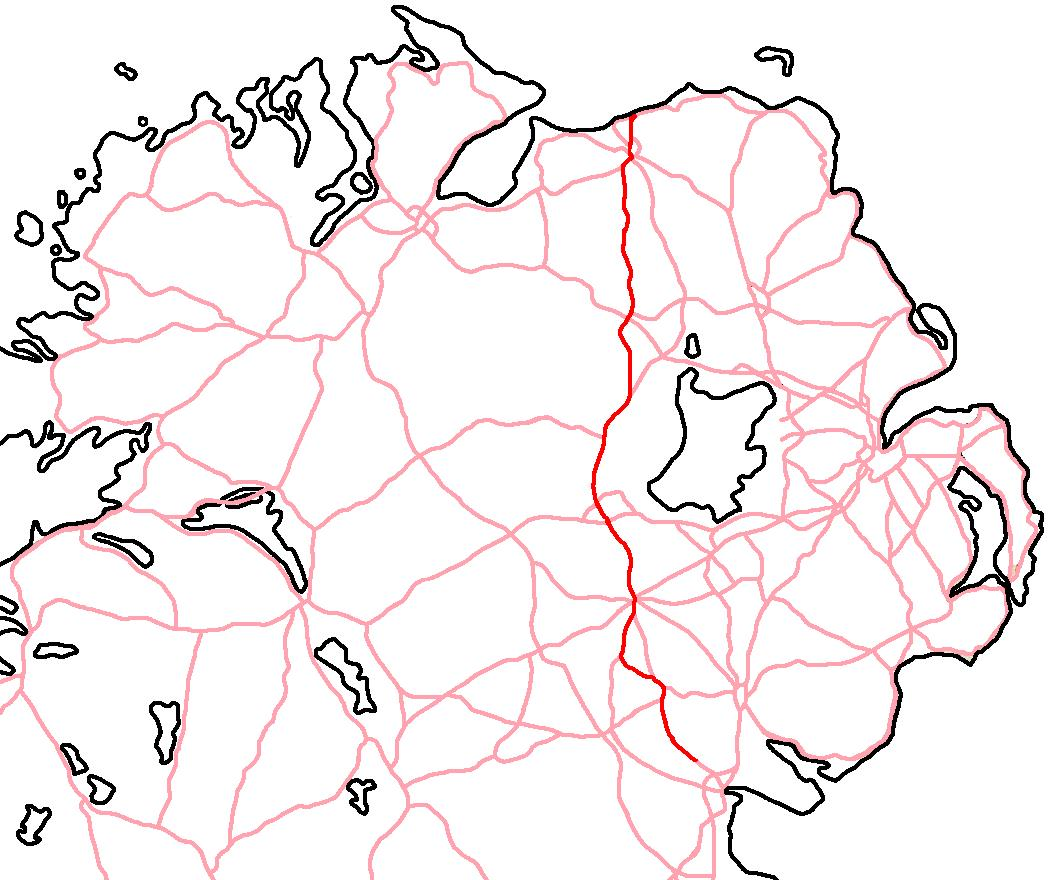
- The route of the A29 in red from Portrush, County Antrim, to the border at Drombilla, County Louth

Route information
- Length: 90.5 mi (145.6 km)

Major junctions
- North end: Portrush
- South end: The border between Silverbridge and Dundalk

Location
- Country: United Kingdom
- Constituent country: Northern Ireland
- Primary destinations: Portrush; Coleraine; Garvagh; Swatragh; Maghera; Tobermore; Desertmartin; Moneymore; Cookstown; Dungannon; Moy; Charlemont; Armagh; Keady; Newtownhamilton; Silverbridge; Dundalk

Road network
- Roads in Northern Ireland; Motorways; A roads in Northern Ireland

The A29 is a major road in Northern Ireland; it is mostly a single carriageway and goes through a number of main towns and connects in several places to other major roads.

== Route ==
The road begins in the town of Portrush, heading south for a few miles before becoming the ring road around Coleraine. The road includes a short section of dual carriageway between Lodge Road Roundabout and Greenmount as part of the shared route with the A37 where it runs west towards Limavady. At a roundabout built in 2005, just outside Macosquin, the A37 continues west while the A29 heads south towards Garvagh.

After Garvagh, the road goes through Swatragh, Maghera, Tobermore, Desertmartin and Moneymore. It then becomes Dual Carriageway as far as Cookstown, goes through Cookstown and onto Dungannon as single-carriageway where is meets the A4 and M1. The road continues south as a single carriageway towards Armagh, passing through the villages of Moy and Charlemont.

After Armagh, the road continues south towards Dundalk as a secondary route, passing through Keady and Newtownhamilton. The road then crosses the border into County Louth in the Republic of Ireland where it becomes the R177, terminating in Dundalk.

== Tourist attractions ==
There are a number of tourist sites on or close to the A29. These include:

- Portrush, and the nearby Giant's Causeway
- Coleraine
- The North West 200 motorcycle races near Coleraine which incorporate part of the A29 into the circuit (Portrush to Coleraine section)
- Garvagh Museum
- The Linen Green, Dungannon
- Armagh Planetarium

== Road quality ==
As of 2006, a number of improvements had been undertaken along the route, including a roundabout at the meeting with the A37, outside Macosquin to reduce delays and smoothing of hidden dips between Maghera and Moneymore. On other parts of the Maghera-Moneymore route the surface is heavily worn and uneven.

While cat's eyes are present to aid night-driving, they are often difficult to see and markings at the side of the road, when in 'open country' are of poor quality.

Cookstown is a common location for traffic congestion and, during the day, contributes to lengthy delays.

Between Dungannon and Cookstown the village of Carland was once an infamous bad bend: a sharp right-hand turn over a bridge that could not easily accommodate passing vehicles and was usually taken at 5 mph. Work on a 1.2 miles (1.9 km) bypass of this bottleneck began in August 2009 and has been completed. On entering Dungannon, the Thomas Street/Hospital Roundabout is a further source of delay at peak times. While local people have suggested a bypass from the M1/A29 roundabout at Stangmore, east of Dungannon to rejoin the existing A29 after Carland (north of Dungannon), there are no plans to build such a road.
