= Ringsend, County Londonderry =

Village in County Londonderry, Northern Ireland

Coordinates: 55.040°N 6.748°W

Ringsend: Irish: Droichead na Carraige
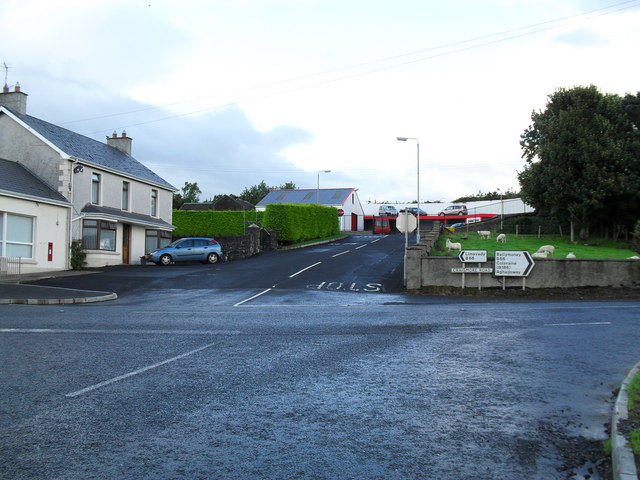
- Boleran Road at junction with Craigmore Road

- Location within Northern Ireland
- District: Coleraine Borough
- County: County Londonderry
- Country: Northern Ireland
- Sovereign state: United Kingdom
- Post town: LONDONDERRY
- Postcode district: BT51
- Dialling code: 028, +44 28
- Police: Northern Ireland
- Fire: Northern Ireland
- Ambulance: Northern Ireland
- UK Parliament: East Londonderry
- NI Assembly: East Londonderry

Ringsend (Irish: Droichead na Carraige) is a small village and electoral ward near Coleraine, County Londonderry, Northern Ireland. It is situated within Causeway Coast and Glens district, and in the 2011 Census the population for the electoral ward was 2,455. There is both a Mass Rock and Priest Chair nearby which were used during anti-Popery laws.
