= Straid =

Village in County Antrim, Northern Ireland

Coordinates: 54°45′22″N 5°55′27″W

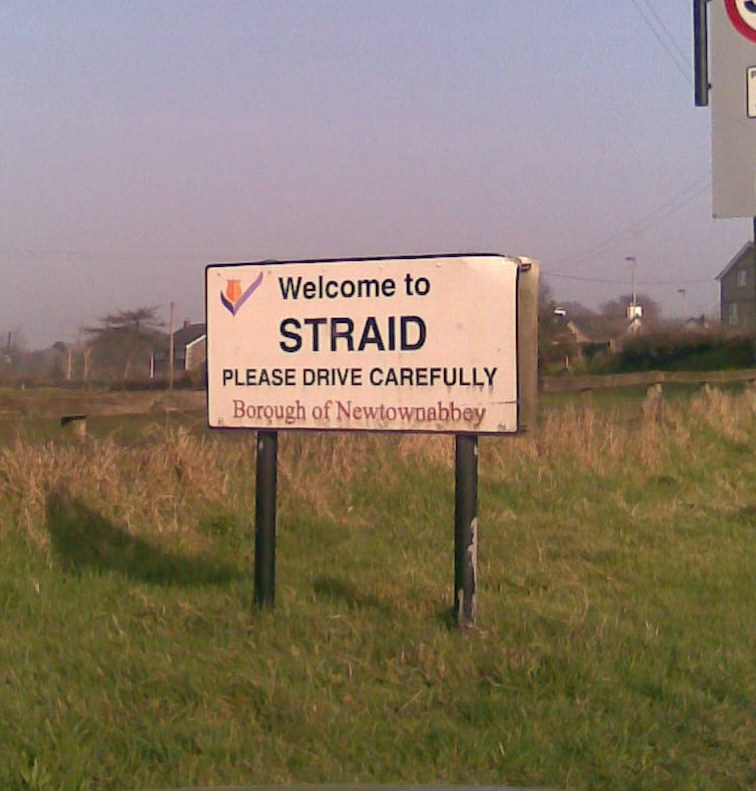
Signage at Straid

Straid (from the Irish: an tSráid) is a small village in County Antrim, Northern Ireland, about three miles east of Ballyclare, and about six miles inland from Carrickfergus. It lies at the centre of the townland of Straidlands, in the Civil Parish of Ballynure within the Antrim and Newtownabbey Borough Council area, and in the former barony of Belfast Lower. The village has a congregational church, an Orange hall, and a primary school.

== History ==
=== Development and name ===
The village is of pre-Norman antiquity. For an exhibition at the Ulster Hall in 1870, the Rev. James Bain of Straid Congregational Church contributed arrow-heads, spear-heads, flint and bronze tools, and ancient coins which had been found in the Straid area. There are other pre-historic earthworks threatened by the expansion of the village.

The name of the village is an Anglicisation of the Irish word sráid, meaning "street", as it was originally just a street. The village has historically developed along Main Street, which contains many original buildings. In recent years, development has been concentrated between Main Street and Irish Hill Road. Straid Primary School and Straid Congregational Church are in the village, the inscription on the church reads "Ebenezer, erected 1816, rebuilt and enlarged 1837" There is also a freemason’s hall.

The local river is called the Bryantang, meaning "the fairy-fort of the tongue." This may refer to a fort, which was located close to Straid Dam (Straid Fisheries) in the middle of Bryantang townland. The existence of the rath (one of many in the area) was noted in the 1839 Ordnance Survey Memoirs on the land of James Boyd, but by 1875 it was said to have been destroyed.

=== 19th century ===
Straid was influenced by the 1859 Christian revival under the then-pastor James Bain. Tom Shaw writes: "The cockfighting pit, which had been a place for vice of the worst kind, became a preaching point where many were won to Christ. Public bars began to close, and profanity and drunkenness, which characterized many lives, were set aside as the Spirit of God moved through the community." James Bain describes a typical revival Sabbath: "Our Sabbath services are continuous, from nine in the morning until ten at night. We are engaged from nine to twelve in prayer meetings for the young, from twelve to two in public service, from two to four in prayer meetings, from five to eight in the evening service, and finally in our evening prayer meeting. The evening services at the church became so well attended that the only suitable place to assemble was outdoors. At one of these evening gatherings, some of the new converts gave testimony, and Bain preached two sermons. The whole audience was gripped with a sense of intense spiritual anxiety. Numbers cried for mercy, and not a single soul departed from that scene until morning." In June 1859, 3000 people gathered for an open-air service in a field adjoining the village.

In the George Henry Bassett's Book of Antrim (1888), the village is described as:

STRAID is a village less than 2 1/2 miles east of Ballyclare, in the barony of Lower Belfast. It had a population of 111 in 1881. Bauxite mines are worked in the immediate vicinity. From Straid Hill, there is a fine view of the surrounding country. The land is good for dairying. Crops: potatoes, oats, and some flax. Straid is in the postal district of Ballyclare. Letters should be addressed, Straid, Ballyclare

Although a small village, it gave the name "Straidlands" to the "townland" of the area. Dominating the village is the "Irish Hill" named after an army camp. A mining village for many years, there is an outcrop of bauxite or Aluminium ore in Irish hill. The woods at the top of the hill have a distinctive gap where a hurricane in the early 1920s blew down part of the forest.

=== 21st century ===
In 2003, the village was expanded by 63 houses, creating a new housing estate at "Village Hill" on the Irish Hill Road. For a number of years, the only two shops in the village were a spirit grocer and Wilson's shop and animal food stuffs. The spirit grocer (a precursor to the modern off licence) was shut when the only alcohol licence for the village was bought by the church to keep Straid "dry" - the nearest pub is now over three miles away in Ballyclare.

== Population ==
In the 1881 census, Straid had a population of 111 people. In the 2001 census, the village had a population of 312 people. In the 2011 census, Straid had a population of 384 people owing to the building of a housing development in 2010.

== Economy ==
One of the main crops previously farmed in the area was flax. Cows are now a common sight in the area, as are sheep. Corn was ground in Straid Corn Mill which was built and operated by the Wilson family. In the 1860s, there was also a kiln and flax mill on the site.

Straid Fishery is one of the largest rainbow trout fisheries in Northern Ireland. Based on Straid Dam, which was man-made around 1824 to supply the cotton mill in Ballynure, there are 3 lakes: 20 acre, 2 acre and .5 acre. Fly fishing on the two lake is complemented by a small coarse lake.

== Notable residents ==
- Stephen Gilbert, novelist, lived in Straid for over 30 years.

== See also ==
- List of villages in Northern Ireland
- List of towns in Northern Ireland
