= Cloughmills =

Village in County Antrim, Northern Ireland

Coordinates: 55.001°N 6.286°W

Cloghmills: Irish: Muileann na Cloiche
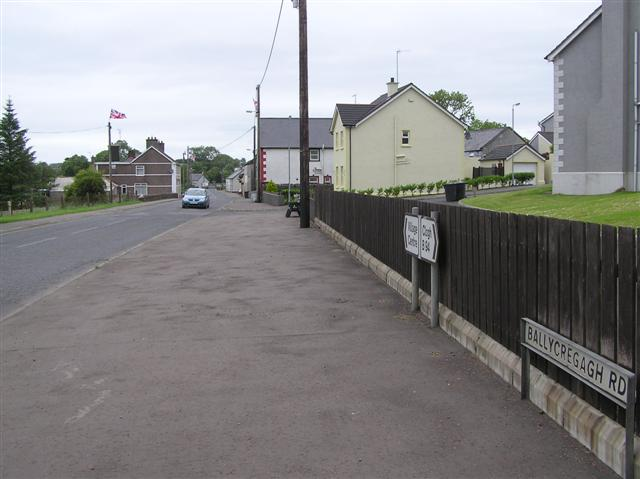
- Ballycregagh Road in Cloghmills

- Location within Northern Ireland
- Population: 1,309 (2011 Census)
- District: Causeway Coast and Glens
- County: County Antrim
- Country: Northern Ireland
- Sovereign state: United Kingdom
- Post town: BALLYMENA
- Postcode district: BT44
- Dialling code: 028
- UK Parliament: North Antrim
- NI Assembly: North Antrim

Cloughmills or Cloghmills (/klɒxˈmɪlz/ klokh-MILZ) is a village in County Antrim, Northern Ireland. Ballymoney is 9 miles to the north-west and Ballymena is 10 miles to the south. It had a population of 1,309 people in the 2011 census. It is in Causeway Coast and Glens District Council.

== Name ==
The name Cloughmills/Cloghmills is a combination of the Irish word cloch (meaning "stone") and the English word mill (referring to the linen mill around which the village grew). An older spelling was Clochmills.

== Features ==
Cloghmills is a local service centre for its surrounding rural hinterland with a good range of retail, commercial, community and educational facilities. Recreational facilities are, however, limited, relative to the size of the village. A substantial number of private sector dwellings have been built over the past decade, which reflect its growing residential function.

Three private housing developments have been built in the village, substantially increasing the population to approximately 2000 individuals in 2008. The Cloughmills Community Action Team (CCAT), made up of local residents, is in the process of reviving a five-year action plan to develop the village for the all who live there, and promote and develop local business initiatives. Cloughmills is home to one of Northern Ireland's leading department stores, Logans of Cloughmills and Boyd Hampers which was established by Andrew and Gareth Boyd in 2001.

== History ==
The industrial heritage of the village can be seen from the old linen mill which is located at the bottom end of the main street beside the medical centre. The mill was fed by the Cloughwater (also known as the Cloughmills Water) river which flows through the southern end of the village. This river feeds into the River Main.

In the early 20th century, the population was about 200.

The former main employer of the village, Cooneen Textiles, a clothing firm, closed down in 1999 with the loss of 128 jobs. The premises changed hands and Cooneen was replaced by a haulage company called Reid Transport. In November 2007 Reid Transport ceased trading with loss of 200 jobs following serious financial difficulties. The African Clothing Company took up residence in the vacated premises later changing its name to All-Tex Recyclers.

=== The Troubles ===
On 12 February 1977, an off duty Royal Ulster Constabulary (RUC) member, Samuel McKane (aged 33), was killed by the IRA outside his home in Cloughmills.

On 14 March 1978, Provisional Irish Republican Army (IRA) masked gunmen planted two explosive devices at the Cloughmills Cooperative Society and Spar supermarket complex. The homemade explosive devices exploded causing minor structural damage and starting a fire which destroyed the interior.

On 18 June 1986 the Provisional Irish Republican Army held a man a gun point and forced him to drive a 500lb bomb to Cloughmills Police Station. The man was able to raise the alarm but the bomb exploded and caused severe damage to the police station and nearby primary school and houses.

== Transport ==
Cloughmills has road links to Ballymoney and Ballymena and is located a short distance east of the A26 key transport corridor. However, it has limited public transport connections.

== Religion ==
- Killagan Church of Ireland Parish Church
- Cloughmills Free Presbyterian Church
- Cloughmills Reformed Presbyterian Church
- Ballyweaney Presbyterian Church
- Church of the Sacred Heart (Roman Catholic)
- Ballynaloob Gospel Hall (Gospel Hall Assemblies)

== Demography ==
Cloughmills had a population of 1,309 people (514 households) in the 2011 census. Of these:

- 32.7% were from a Catholic background and 63.0% were from a Protestant background

== Notable people ==
- Alan McGuckian SJ (born 1953), Roman Catholic prelate and Bishop of Raphoe

== International relations ==
=== Twin towns - Sister cities ===
- (United States) Benbrook, Texas, USA
- Vanves, France (since 2000)
