= Shrigley, County Down =

Village in County Down, Northern Ireland

Coordinates: 54.411°N 5.664°W

Shrigley is a small village in County Down, Northern Ireland about a mile north-west of Killyleagh. It is named after Pott Shrigley in Cheshire. In the 2001 Census it had a population of 456. It lies within the Down District Council area.

== History ==
Shrigley is a small satellite industrial village which grew up around the large six-storey cotton mill built in 1824 by John Martin. In 1836, Shrigley mill had more power looms than any other factory in Ireland. In the following year, Samuel Lewis described it at length:

Some large mills were built upon a copious stream, in 1824, by Messrs. Martin & Co., and were greatly enlarged in 1828: in these works are 13,798 spindles, employing 186 persons, and 244 power-looms attended by 156 persons, constantly engaged in weaving printers' cloths for the Manchester market; and connected with this manufactory are more than 2000 hand-looms in the neighbouring districts. The buildings, which are very spacious and six storeys high, are lighted with gas made on the premises, and the proprietors have erected a steam-engine of 35 horse power.

The original mill was burned down in 1845. It was replaced by a flax-spinning mill, subsequently occupied by United Chrometanners Limited.

The Grecian gate pillars, and some of the subsidiary stone buildings, were probably survivors of the original mill and stood until recently. Naturally, the mill became the principal source of employment in the locality. Most of the workers lived in Killyleagh, but a number of blackstone workers' cottages were built in a cluster along the three streets at the mill gate.

During his lifetime, the people of the district resolved to commemorate the contribution John Martin had made to their prosperity; a competition was held in 1870 for designs for a clock tower and drinking fountain in his honour; the premium was awarded to Timothy Hevey, a young Belfast architect apparently then working with Pugin and Ashlin in Dublin. The work was executed in 1871, and a High Victorian monument was erected at the cross-roads outside the mill gate. John Martin died in 1876 at the age of 79; Timothy Hevey died in 1878 at the age of 33.

Between 1968 and 1972, according to the Downpatrick Area Plan, 'a very extensive redevelopment project was completed involving the replacement of the early industrial village, the construction of 154 houses and two shops'. The new construction was suburban in style, and the people were all rehoused in a housing estate on the opposite hillside. Of the original buildings the Martin monument still stands, in isolation, at the mill gate.

== Shrigley Monument (Martin Memorial) ==
Shrigley monument

1871, designed by Timothy Hevey. A monument of brown stone, in three layers; the design has much in common with the Rossmore Memorial of about the same date in the Diamond of Monaghan town. The base, surrounded by iron railings, originally with an elaborate lamp at each corner, is square. Upon this, an octagonal arcade of round-headed arches, carried on columns with Ruskinian foliated capitals, surrounds the central shaft, which incorporates the drinking-fountain. Above this rises a square tower, supported by eight flying buttresses springing from pinnacles; in each face is a triple pointed opening divided by small foliate-capitaled columns. Above these openings are large circular oculi in which the clock (now entirely disappeared) displayed its four faces. The tower is surmounted by acute angled gable-pediments, with five-lobed ogee centre pieces; four corner pinnacles, the crockets now missing; and a pyramidal roof terminating in ornate cresting.

During the 1970s the mill was used as a tannery employing many men and women from Shrigley and Killeagh. Atlantic Tanners were fine tanners of local cow hides shipped worldwide.
