= Carland =

Carland is a surname. Notable people with the name include:

- Jarrod Carland, Australian creative director
- John Emmett Carland (1853–1922), United States circuit judge
- Matt Carland (1909–1998), Australian rules footballer
- Susan Carland (born 1980), Australian academic, author, TV presenter
- Tammy Rae Carland (born 1965), American photographer, video artist, zine editor

== See also ==
- Carland, Michigan, civil township of Shiawassee County in the U.S. state of Michigan
- Carland Cross, location in Cornwall, England, United Kingdom
- Carland Cross (TV series), 1996 animated detective television series
