= Drumquin =

Village in County Tyrone, Northern Ireland

Coordinates: 54.616095°N 7.490444°W

Drumquin: Irish: Droim Caoin
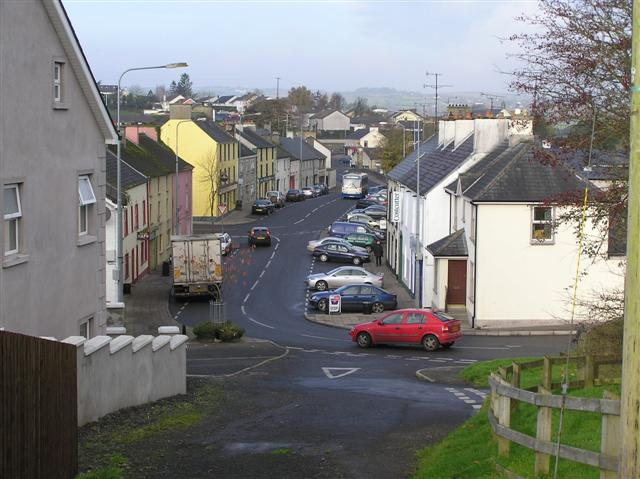

- Location within Northern Ireland
- Irish grid reference: H329743
  - Belfast: 77 miles (124 km)
- District: Fermanagh and Omagh
- County: County Tyrone
- Country: Northern Ireland
- Sovereign state: United Kingdom
- Post town: OMAGH
- Postcode district: BT78
- Dialling code: 028, +44 28
- UK Parliament: West Tyrone
- NI Assembly: West Tyrone

Drumquin (Irish: Droim Caoin, meaning 'pleasant ridge') is a village and townland (of 398 acres) in County Tyrone, Northern Ireland. It lies between Omagh and Castlederg, on the banks of the Drumquin River (Fairywater). It is situated in the civil parishes of both Longfield West and Longfield East. The main part of the village is located in Longfield East, in the townland of Drumnaforbe, whilst Longfield West is where its namesake townland Drumquin is located. Drumquin is in the historic barony of Omagh West.

== History ==
=== Early history ===
The area is home to a number of stone circles and a holy well. An erratic, known as the Giant's Stone, is on Dooish Mountain.

In 1802, the countryside around Drumquin was described as one continuous scene of dreary mountains. However, the traveler did point out that forty years before that a rich coalmine had been opened at Drumquin and a canal opened to transport the coal.

While Drumquin has been in existence since 1211, Sir John Davies founded the village itself in 1617. Davies also built Castle Curlews, later called Castle Kirlish, the remains of which can be seen in the townland of that name. His agent was a man called Bradley, one of whose family was responsible in later times for the building of the fine stone house, which is a feature of the village today. Castle Kirlish was joined to Castlederg Castle by a straight causeway, which was seven miles (11 km) long. Traces of this causeway could still be observed in 1837.

=== 19th and 20th centuries ===
Drumquin was also a staging town in the 19th and early 20th century for coaches and travellers who were making their way to Derry from Omagh and vice versa. As a result of this the village flourished and hosted a hotel and several shops. Felix Kearney immortalised this area with songs such as "The Hills Above Drumquin" and others. On 26 August 1920, during the Irish War of Independence, the Irish Republican Army (IRA) attacked the Royal Irish Constabulary (RIC) barracks in Drumquin. One RIC constable and one IRA volunteer were killed.

The works of the Irish writer Benedict Kiely (1919–2007) contain a number of references to the Drumquin district, with which he had family connections on his mother's side.

=== The Troubles ===
On 6 February 1989, James (Josie) Connolly, a member of the Provisional IRA, died in a premature explosion while attempting to plant a booby trap bomb under a car outside the home of a Royal Ulster Constabulary (RUC) officer.

== Geography ==
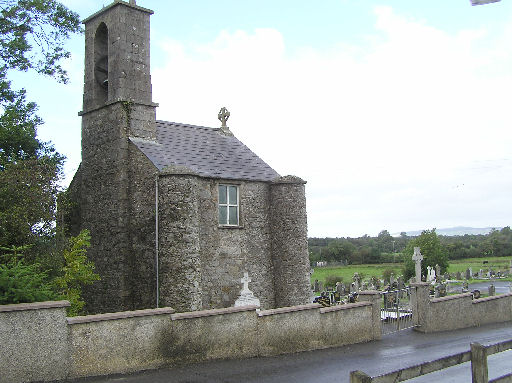
Bell tower at St Patrick's church, Drumquin

The geography of the area is a mixture of flat fertile lands that clings to the banks of the Fairywater and steep rolling hills. There are also forests to the southwest of the village. Lough Bradan is also located roughly 7 miles from the village. The land is also covered in numerous rivers and streams, and two rivers meet on the outskirts of the village to form the river Fairywater.

The village itself is dominated by Dooish Mountain which is the highest point in the area. Close to the village Sloughan Glen Waterfalls can be found; these rest in a deep ravine. Beyond the townland of Bradan lies miles of wet bogland that stretch to the border with County Fermanagh. In the area of the glen the land rises dramatically before falling again into the Fermanagh countryside. The area in general is also dotted with several quarries, the biggest of these lying 2 miles outside of the village itself.

== Sport ==
Drumquin Wolfe Tones is the local Gaelic Athletic Association (GAA) club which has been in existence in its current form since 1968. Previous clubs have existed in various forms from the early 1930s. The club has experienced success in recent years at underage level, with teams at Minor level winning the double in 2018 and 2021.

An association football (soccer) club, Drumquin United, was founded in 2007.

== Demography ==
=== 19th century population ===
The population of the village decreased during the 19th century:

| Year | 1841 | 1851 | 1861 | 1871 | 1881 | 1891 |
|---|---|---|---|---|---|---|
| Population | 352 | 316 | 354 | 247 | 221 | 218 |
| Houses | 71 | 61 | 75 | 51 | 51 | 52 |

=== 2011 census ===
On census day in 2011, 71.3% of the area's inhabitants were from a Catholic background and 26.6% were from a Protestant background.

== Drumquin townland ==
The townland is situated in the historic barony of Omagh West and the civil parish of Longfield West and covers an area of 398 acres. The population of the townland declined during the 19th century:

| Year | 1841 | 1851 | 1861 | 1871 | 1881 | 1891 |
|---|---|---|---|---|---|---|
| Population | 91 | 100 | 70 | 78 | 72 | 56 |
| Houses | 22 | 17 | 13 | 16 | 16 | 13 |

The village of Drumquin is in both the townland of the same name, and in townland of Drumnaforbe in the civil parish of Longfield East. In 1891 the village was estimated to cover an area of 12 acres.

== Twin towns ==
Llantrisant has a twinning arrangement with:

- Pont-Remy, France, since 1999.

== See also ==
- List of townlands of County Tyrone
