= R187 road (Ireland) =

Road in Ireland

Coordinates: 54.239507°N 7.084083°W

R187 road
- Bóthar R187
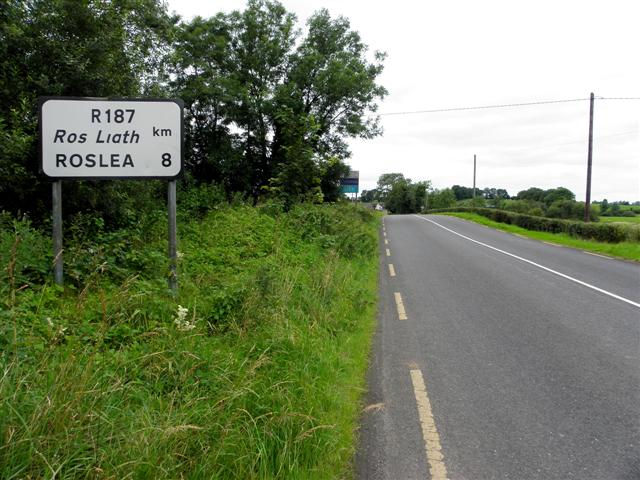
- R187 at Annaghervy

Route information
- Length: 7.0 km (4.3 mi)

Major junctions
- From: Inishammon (Border)
- To: N54 Annaghervy

Location
- Country: Ireland

Highway system
- Roads in Ireland; Motorways; Primary; Secondary; Regional

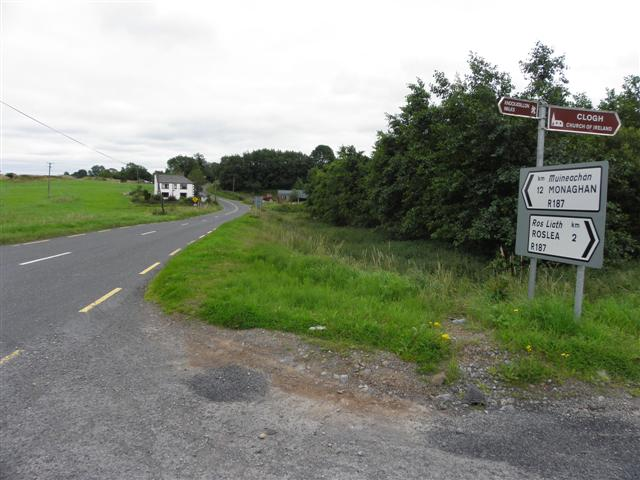
R187 at Inishammon

The R187 road is a regional road in Ireland, located in County Monaghan. It runs from the N54 to the border, where it continues as the B36 road to Rosslea, County Fermanagh.
