= Aghagallon =

Village in County Antrim, Northern Ireland

Coordinates: 54.509°N 6.294°W

Aghagallon: Irish: Achadh Gallan
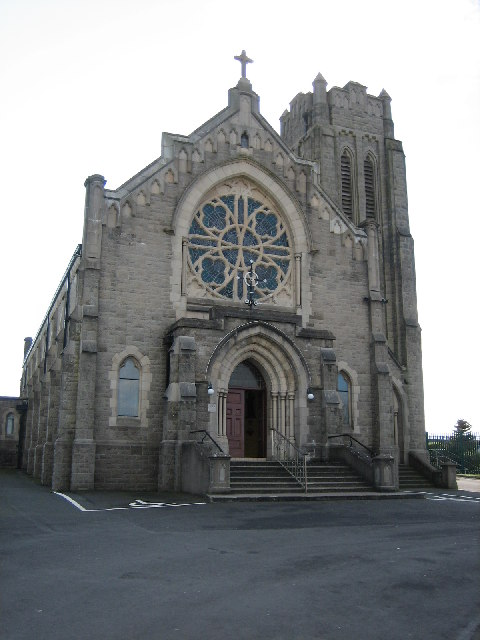
- St. Patrick Catholic Church, Aghagallon

- Location within Northern Ireland
- Population: 1,175 (2021 census)
- Irish grid reference: J104636
  - Belfast: 22 mi (35 km)
- District: Armagh, Banbridge and Craigavon
- County: County Antrim
- Country: Northern Ireland
- Sovereign state: United Kingdom
- Post town: CRAIGAVON
- Postcode district: BT67
- Dialling code: 028, +44 28
- UK Parliament: Lagan Valley
- NI Assembly: Lagan Valley

Aghagallon (from Irish Achadh Gallan , meaning 'field of the standing stones') is a small village and civil parish in County Antrim, Northern Ireland. It is about four miles (6 km) northwest of Moira, County Down. The village population was 1,175 at the 2021 census, compared with 824 in the 2001 census.

Aghagallon has mainly developed along Aghalee Road in a linear fashion with development to the southeast along Colane Road. St Patrick's Church and the adjacent primary school are in the middle of the village. Although the village is named after the townland of Aghagallon, it lies almost wholly within neighbouring Derrynaseer townland.

== Education ==
The village has two primary schools, St Patrick's Primary School (Aghagallon) and St Mary's Primary School, Gawley's Gate (Derrymore).

== 2001 Census ==
Aghagallon is classified as a small village or hamlet by the NI Statistics and Research Agency (NISRA) (i.e. with population between 500 and 1,000 people).

On census day (29 April 2001) there were 824 people living in Aghagallon village. Of these:

- 32.3% were aged under 16 and 11.7% were aged 60 and over
- 50.2% of the population were male and 49.8% were female
- 96.6% were from a Catholic background and 3.0% were from a Protestant background;
- 3.2% of people aged 16–74 were unemployed.

In the 2001 census the resident population of Aghagallon Ward was 3,806 (including the village), of whom:

- 29.3% were under 16 years old and 13.6% were aged 60 and over;
- 50.5% of the population were male and 49.5% were female;
- 85.5% were from a Catholic community background and 12.6% were from a 'Protestant and Other Christian (including Christian related)' community background;
- 30.3% of persons aged 16 and over were single (never married);
- 32.5 years was the average age of the population; and
- the population density was 0.4 persons per hectare.

The population for the civil parish of Aghagallon in 2010 was estimated at 4,586, of which 25.4% were children, 32.1% were young working age adults, 29.9% were older working age adults and 12.6% were older people. Young working age adults are defined as 16- to 39-year-olds, and older working age adults as males 40–64 and females 40–59 years. This represents an increase of 20.1% (768 individuals) from the estimated mid-year ward population in 2001.

The Farm Census 2010 recorded 89 farms registered to addresses in Aghagallon, and the total agricultural labour force was 170 persons.

== Sport ==
Aghagallon has one Gaelic Athletic Association (GAA) club, Naomh Mhuire, which serves the areas of Aghagallon village, Gawley's Gate and Ballinderry, County Antrim after clubs in these areas folded over the years. They currently play in Division 1 of the Antrim All-County League at Páirc na nGael field located on the Colane Road. Although the club is part of Antrim GAA, it has links to Armagh and fields some teams in the North Armagh leagues. Aghagallon competes in the Antrim Senior Football Championship.

In 2025 St. Mary's fielded their first LGFA senior ladies football team in Division 3 of the Antrim LGFA league.

== Notable people ==
- Breandán Mac Cionnaith, Irish republican activist
- Mollie McGeown (1923–2004), nephrologist and biochemist
- Marc Wilson (born 1987), former professional footballer

== Townlands of Aghagallon Parish ==
The parish of Aghagallon consists of 13 townlands; Aghadrumglasny, Aghagallon, Ballycairn, Ballykeel, Ballymacilrany, Derryclone, Derryhirk, Derrymore, Derrynaseer, Drumaleet, Montiaghs, Tamnyvane, and Tiscallen.

== See also ==
- List of civil parishes of County Antrim
