= Derg Castle =

Historic property in Northern Ireland

Coordinates: 54.7071°N 7.5966°W

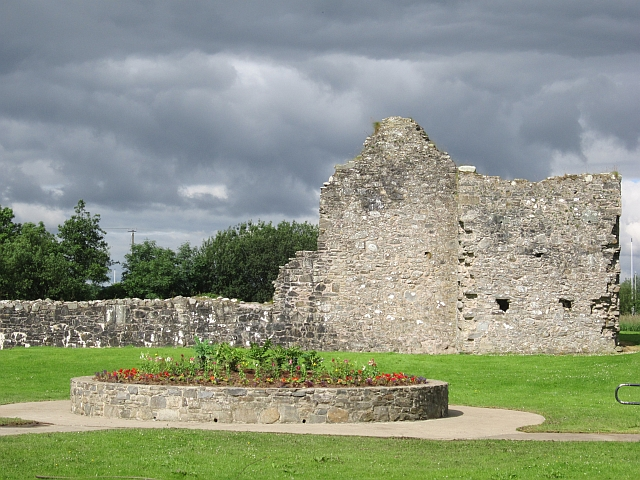

Derg Castle, also called Castlederg Castle, is a post-medieval ruined fortification, situated on the north bank of the River Derg, within the town of Castlederg, in County Tyrone, Northern Ireland. It has given the town its name: 'Castlederg' derives from the Irish Caisleán na Deirge, meaning 'Castle on the Derg'.

It is a Scheduled Historic Monument, administered by the Northern Ireland Department for Communities.

== History ==
The earliest record of a castle at Castlederg is from 1497 when, according to the Annals of Ulster, an O'Donnell castle there was attacked and taken by the O'Neills, only to be recaptured in 1505. It was probably in the style of a square Tower House, strategically positioned to command and defend a ford on the river. The castle changed hands several times in the late 15th and early 16th centuries during the contests for land and supremacy between the warring O'Neill and O'Donnell clans.

In 1610, under the scheme for the Plantation of Ulster, the area was granted to Sir John Davies, Attorney General for Ireland, under King James I. The existing castle was reconstructed into a bawn with 3 open flankers. During that time Davies also built Kirlish ('Curlews') Castle and connected them both with a straight causeway which was 7 miles long. In 1619 Captain Nicholas Pynnar, described both castles in a survey: "Sir John Davies, hath 2,000 acres, called Gavelagh and Clonaghmore, alias Castle Dirge and Castle Curlews. Upon this Proportion there are built two strong and fair Castles of Lyme and Stone, but no Bawne to them."

In 1622, Derg Castle was described as, "a bawne of stone & lyme, not finished, being 100ft long, 80ft broad & 5ft high, with 3 open Flankers of the same height."

During the Irish rebellion of 1641, Derg Castle was a place of refuge for the local Scottish settler community. The fortifications appear to have been of considerable strength because a small garrison was able to withstand a siege by a much larger force, led by Sir Phelim O'Neill, before being forced to abandon the castle after running out of ammunition.

In 1689, during the Williamite War, Derg Castle was again garrisoned by the settler population, but surrendered to James II's forces on being promised that their lives would be spared. After this the castle appears not to have been used anymore and fell to ruin.

== Present day ==
At present the tower house has disappeared. The walls and flankers on the south side have largely disappeared due to erosion by the river.

Derg Castle can be located at Grid Ref: NV 39666 49068
