= Gawley's Gate =

Village in County Antrim, Northern Ireland

Coordinates: 54°32′29″N 6°19′08″W

Gawley's Gate: Irish: Geata Mhic Amhlaí
- Location within Northern Ireland
  - Belfast: 17 mi (27 km)
  - Dublin: 80 mi (130 km)
- District: Armagh City, Banbridge and Craigavon
- County: County Antrim
- Country: Northern Ireland
- Sovereign state: United Kingdom
- Post town: CRAIGAVON
- Postcode district: BT67
- Dialling code: 028
- UK Parliament: Lagan Valley
- NI Assembly: Lagan Valley

Gawley's Gate (From Irish Geata Mhic Amhlaí) is a small village in County Antrim, Northern Ireland. It is situated on the south-eastern shore of Lough Neagh, seven miles to the north of Lurgan and ten miles west of Lisburn. It has a jetty and picnic areas, used by boating enthusiasts on the Lough. It consists of a small number of houses in close proximity; however, it is a focal point for much of the countryside on the shore of Lough Neagh from Glenavy to Aghagallon. The rural location means that much of the community is involved in farming in some capacity as well as fishing. The landscape is quite wet with marshland in places and dense woods giving way to cleared hillocks or 'islands' where settlements have developed. It also a destination for wildfowlers and birdwatchers due to the habitat which exists particularly around the RSPB sanctuary at nearby Portmore Lough.

The name "Gawley's Gate" is attributed to the family that controlled the toll gate when this section of the road was first constructed in the 17th century.

The quay and picnic area at Gawley's Gate was constructed with funding from the European Peace Programme and was opened by the First Minister David Trimble and Agriculture Minister Bríd Rodgers in May 2007.

== See also ==
- List of towns and villages in Northern Ireland
- List of places in County Antrim
