= Lisdoo, County Louth =

Townland of Dundalk, Ireland

Coordinates: 54.0216°N 6.40253°W

Lisdoo is a small townland north of Dundalk in County Louth, Ireland. The townland, which is approximately 122 acres (0.2 sq mi) in area, is in the electoral division of Dundalk Rural. It is in the civil parish of Dundalk. The Castletown River flows to the south of Lisdoo.
