= Castlederg =

Town in County Tyrone, Northern Ireland

Castlederg: Irish: Caisleán na Deirge
- Town
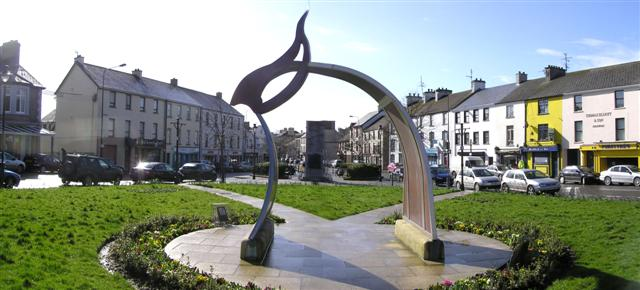
- The Diamond, Castlederg

- Location within Northern Ireland
- Population: 2,980 (2021 census)
- Irish grid reference: H262845
  - Belfast: 85 miles
- District: Derry City and Strabane
- County: County Tyrone
- Country: Northern Ireland
- Sovereign state: United Kingdom
- Post town: CASTLEDERG
- Postcode district: BT81
- Dialling code: 028
- Police: Northern Ireland
- Fire: Northern Ireland
- Ambulance: Northern Ireland
- UK Parliament: West Tyrone
- NI Assembly: West Tyrone

Castlederg (earlier Caslanadergy, from Irish Caisleán na Deirge, meaning 'castle on the Derg') is a small historic market town in County Tyrone, Northern Ireland. It lies on the River Derg and is near the border with County Donegal, Ireland. It stands in the townlands of Castlesessagh and Churchtown, in the historic barony of Omagh West and the civil parish of Urney. The town has a ruined castle and two ancient tombs known as the Druid's Altar and Todd's Den. It had a population of 2,980 people at the 2021 census.

The town hosts some of the district's key events each year, including the Derg Vintage Rally, Dergfest music festival, Red River Festival and the traditional Apple Fair.

Castlederg was a traveller's stop along the ancient pilgrimage route to Station Island on Lough Derg. The town boasts ancient ruins and monastic settlements.

== History ==
=== Early history ===
Historically the area around the town was a site of contestation between the territories of Cenél nEógain (later Tír Eoghain) and Connail (later Tír Chonaill – mostly modern County Donegal). This rivalry between the two powers continued until the 16th century when they combined in the defence of Ulster against the encroaching Elizabethan armies. The Castlederg area, lying within the new barony of Omagh, was granted to the English Attorney-General for Ireland, Sir John Davies. Two castles were constructed on his proportion, Castle Curlews (Kirlish Castle) outside Drumquin and Derg Castle, the ruins of which can be seen today on the northern bank of the River Derg at Castlederg. A bronze-age cauldron was found at Castlederg and is now held in the national museum of Ireland

=== The Troubles ===
During the Troubles, 25 people were killed in and around Castlederg (including Killeter and Killen) and there were many bombings in the village. The Provisional Irish Republican Army (IRA) killed 11 members of the Ulster Defence Regiment and Royal Ulster Constabulary, four fellow IRA members whom it accused of being informers, and three Ulster Protestant civilians. Four IRA members were also killed when their bombs exploded prematurely. Ulster loyalist paramilitaries killed three Catholic civilians.

== Transport ==
The narrow-gauge Castlederg and Victoria Bridge Tramway was built in 1883, to link the village with the Great Northern Railway (Ireland) at Victoria Bridge. Castlederg railway station opened on 4 July 1884, but was finally closed on 17 April 1933.

== Demography ==
=== 2021 census ===
On census day in 2021 (21 March 2021), the usually resident population of Castlederg Settlement was 2,980. Of these:

- 20.20% were aged under 16, 60.64% were aged between 16 and 65, and 19.16% were aged 66 and over.
- 52.75% of the population were female and 47.25% were male.
- 57.25% belong to or were brought up Catholic, 38.19% belong to or were brought up Protestant (including other Christian denominations), 0.94% belonged to or were brought up in an 'other' religion, and 3.62% did not adhere to or had no religion.
- 39.83% indicated they had an Irish national identity, 33.96% indicated they had a British national identity, 32.38% indicated they had a Northern Irish national identity, and 4.46% indicated they had an 'other' national identity. (respondents could indicate more than one national identity)
- 13.36% had some knowledge of Irish (Gaeilge) and 10% had some knowledge of Ulster Scots.

=== 2011 census ===
Castlederg is classified as an intermediate settlement by the Northern Ireland Statistics and Research Agency (NISRA) (i.e. with a population between 2,500 and 4,999 people). On census day in 2011 (27 March 2011), the usually resident population of Castlederg Settlement was 2,976, accounting for 0.16% of the NI total. Of these:

- 19.72% were under 16 years old and 16.97% were aged 65 and above.
- 48.42% of the population were male and 51.58% were female.
- 55.36% were from a Catholic community background and 40.22% were from a 'Protestant and Other Christian (including Christian related)' community background.
- 36.56% indicated that they had a British national identity, 34.54% had an Irish national identity, and 30.51% had a Northern Irish national identity.

=== 19th century population ===
The population of the village increased during the 19th century:

Year	1841	1851	1861	1871	1881	1891
Population	476	596	637	703	756	796
Horses	81	102	106	119	137	155

== Climate ==
Climate data for Castlederg WMO ID: 03904; coordinates 54°42′25″N 7°34′39″W; elevation: 49 m (161 ft), 1991–2020 normals, extremes 1995-present
Month	Jan	Feb	Mar	Apr	May	Jun	Jul	Aug	Sep	Oct	Nov	Dec	Year
Record high °C (°F)	15.5 (59.9)	16.4 (61.5)	21.0 (69.8)	24.1 (75.4)	26.2 (79.2)	30.8 (87.4)	31.3 (88.3)	29.3 (84.7)	28.0 (82.4)	21.6 (70.9)	17.1 (62.8)	15.2 (59.4)	31.3 (88.3)
Mean daily maximum °C (°F)	7.6 (45.7)	8.3 (46.9)	10.1 (50.2)	12.6 (54.7)	15.5 (59.9)	17.7 (63.9)	19.0 (66.2)	18.8 (65.8)	16.8 (62.2)	13.4 (56.1)	10.0 (50.0)	7.7 (45.9)	13.1 (55.6)
Daily mean °C (°F)	4.6 (40.3)	4.9 (40.8)	6.3 (43.3)	8.2 (46.8)	10.8 (51.4)	13.4 (56.1)	15.0 (59.0)	14.7 (58.5)	12.8 (55.0)	9.7 (49.5)	6.8 (44.2)	4.7 (40.5)	9.3 (48.8)
Mean daily minimum °C (°F)	1.6 (34.9)	1.5 (34.7)	2.4 (36.3)	3.7 (38.7)	6.0 (42.8)	9.1 (48.4)	10.9 (51.6)	10.7 (51.3)	8.7 (47.7)	6.0 (42.8)	3.5 (38.3)	1.6 (34.9)	5.5 (41.9)
Record low °C (°F)	−12.7 (9.1)	−8.0 (17.6)	−8.7 (16.3)	−7.0 (19.4)	−3.9 (25.0)	0.5 (32.9)	2.5 (36.5)	1.3 (34.3)	−2.2 (28.0)	−5.6 (21.9)	−8.5 (16.7)	−18.7 (−1.7)	−18.7 (−1.7)
Average precipitation mm (inches)	124.1 (4.89)	100.6 (3.96)	88.4 (3.48)	74.4 (2.93)	70.3 (2.77)	76.6 (3.02)	86.9 (3.42)	91.0 (3.58)	88.4 (3.48)	111.8 (4.40)	122.0 (4.80)	132.8 (5.23)	1,167.3 (45.96)
Average precipitation days (≥ 1.0 mm)	18.7	16.5	15.8	13.8	13.9	12.8	15.0	16.2	15.1	16.5	18.6	18.9	191.8
Source 1: Met Office
Source 2: Starlings Roost Weather

=== 2010 and 2021 temperature records ===
Castlederg recorded Northern Ireland's lowest-ever recorded temperature of −18.7 °C (−1.7 °F) on the morning of 23 December 2010. The town recorded Northern Ireland's highest-ever recorded temperature of 31.3 °C (88.3 °F) on 21 July 2021. On 22 July, Armagh reported 31.4 °C (88.5 °F) which has since been rejected by the UK Met Office, meaning Castlederg holds both the highest and lowest temperature records in Northern Ireland. Prior to the 21st and 22nd, the record was also broken on 17 July 2021 with a value of 31.2 °C (88.2 °F) at Ballywatticock.

== Governance ==
The town is one of the electoral wards in the Derg district electoral area of Derry City and Strabane District Council. The other wards are Finn, Glenderg, Newtownstewart and Sion Mills. Below are the results of the 2019 Derry City and Strabane District Council election

=== Derg ===
2014: 3 x Sinn Féin, 1 x DUP, 1 x UUP
2019: 2 x Sinn Féin, 1 x DUP, 1 x UUP, 1 x SDLP
2014-2019 change: SDLP gain one seat from Sinn Féin

Derg – 5 seats
Party	Candidate	FPv%	Count				
Party	Candidate	FPv%	1	2	3	4	5
DUP	Keith Kerrigan	13.62	1,090	1,092	1,711		
UUP	Derek Hussey*	15.83	1,267	1,279	1,418		
Sinn Féin	Ruairí McHugh*	13.57	1,086	1,089	1,089	1,089	1,579
SDLP	Cara Hunter	12.89	1,032	1,092	1,094	1,194	1,287
Sinn Féin	Kieran McGuire*	13.43	1,075	1,081	1,081	1,081	1,232
Independent	Andy Patton	9.18	735	784	791	922	981
Sinn Féin	Maolíosa McHugh*	9.97	798	806	807	808	
DUP	Thomas Kerrigan	9.63	771	773			
Alliance	Anne Murray	1.87	150				
Electorate: 12,996 Valid: 8,004 Spoilt: 116 Quota: 1,335 Turnout: 62.48%

== Education ==
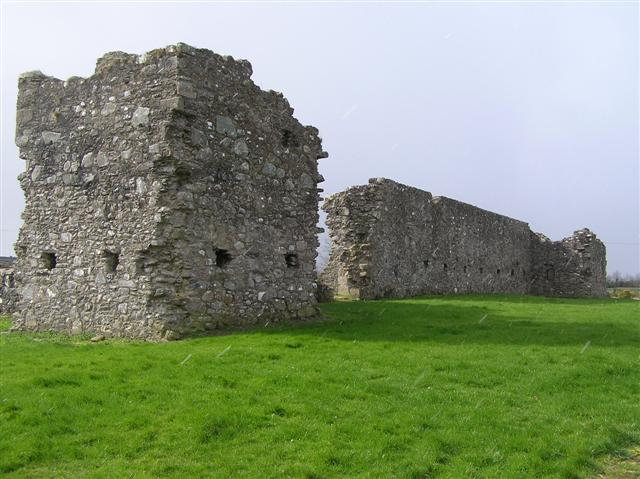
The remains of Castlederg Castle

=== Primary ===
- Edwards Primary School – established 1938
- Erganagh Primary school – closed
- Gaelscoil na Deirge
- Killen Primary School – established 1935
- Saint Patrick's Primary School – established in 1973

=== Secondary ===
- Castlederg High School – established 1958
- St Eugene's High School – 1961 to 2013

== Sport ==
Association football soccer clubs in the area include Dergview F.C. (playing in the NIFL Premier Intermediate League), Castlederg United (Fermanagh & Western Division 2) and St Patricks (Fermanagh & Western Division 3).

The local Gaelic Athletic Association (GAA) club, Castlederg St. Eugene's, is primarily a Gaelic football club.

== Notable people ==
- Conor Bradley, footballer for Liverpool F.C. and the Northern Ireland national team, grew up in Castlederg
- Michelle Gallen, author of Factory Girls and Big Girl Small Town, grew up in Castlederg
- James Harper (1780–1873), U.S. congressman, born in Castlederg
- Ivan Sproule, former footballer, grew up in Castlederg
