= Clady, County Tyrone =

Village and townland in County Tyrone, Northern Ireland

Coordinates: 54°47′39″N 7°32′24″W

Clady: Irish: Claidigh
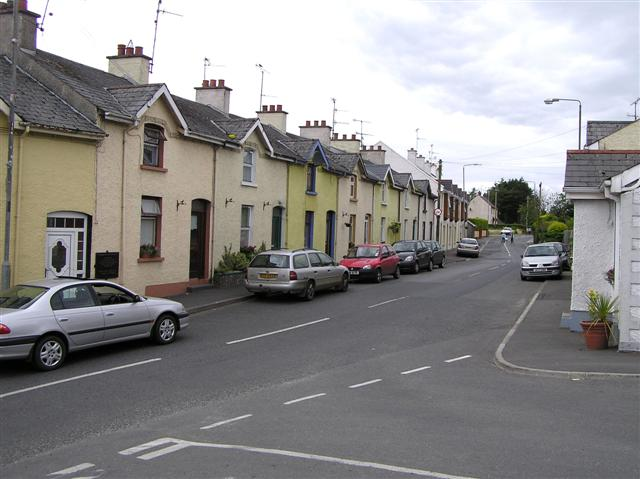
- Urney Road, for Strabane

- Location within Northern Ireland
- Population: 623 (2021 census)
- District: Derry City and Strabane
- County: County Tyrone
- Country: Northern Ireland
- Sovereign state: United Kingdom
- Post town: STRABANE
- Postcode district: BT82
- Dialling code: 028
- Police: Northern Ireland
- Fire: Northern Ireland
- Ambulance: Northern Ireland
- UK Parliament: West Tyrone
- NI Assembly: West Tyrone

Clady (from Irish Claidigh, meaning 'muddy margin of a stream or river') is a small village and townland in County Tyrone, Northern Ireland. It lies about 4 miles from Strabane on the River Finn and borders the Republic of Ireland. In the 2021 census it had a population of 623 people. It is within Urney civil parish and the former barony of Strabane Lower. In local government it is part of the Derry City and Strabane District Council. The townland covers an area of 173 acres.

== History ==
The village is one of the oldest in the district. The village is referred to as Claudy in Samuel Lewis' Topographical Dictionary of Ireland, but early and later works attribute the name, Clady, distinguishing it from Claudy in County Londonderry.

Next to the village is an important passage over the River Finn, one of the "passes", which controlled the access to Derry from the south and east in the times when the ferry at Drry was the only means to cross the River Foyle. Originally, the passage at Clady was provided by a ford, known as the Cladyford. Soon a bridge was built, which existed already in the 17th century. According to Lewis in 1840, a "handsome bridge of seven arches" spanned the river near the village.

This passage over the Finn was contested during the Williamite War on 15 April 1689 when Jacobite cavalry under Richard Hamilton and the Duke of Berwick forced the passage. Some days later James II crossed the Finn at this place, proceeded to Derry and summoned the city to surrender. With these events started the Siege of Derry.

In February 1922, during the Irish War of Independence, an Ulster Special Constabulary platoon attempting to enter Clady were forced to withdraw two nights in a row after coming under fire from the Irish Republican Army. One USC officer was killed in the clashes.

=== The Troubles ===
For more information see The Troubles in Clady (Tyrone), which includes a list of incidents in Clady during the Troubles resulting in two or more fatalities.

== Demography ==
=== 19th century population ===
The population of the village decreased during the 19th century:

Year	1841	1851	1861	1871	1881	1891
Population	219	155	170	119	121	109
Houses	44	35	33	33	28	31

The population of the townland increased overall during the 19th century:

Year	1841	1851	1861	1871	1881	1891
Population	50	12	61	49	38	62
Houses	10	2	13	9	12	13

In 1891, the town of Clady, which stands in the townlands of Clady and Donnygowen, had an estimated area of 10 acres.

=== 2011 Census ===
On Census day (27 March 2011) there were 538 people living in Clady, of which:

- 2.2% belong to or were brought up in a 'Protestant and Other Christian (including Christian related)' religion and 97.6% belong to or were brought up in the Catholic religion;

== Sport ==
- Urney St. Columba's is the local Gaelic Athletic Association club.

== See also ==
- List of villages in Northern Ireland
- List of towns in Northern Ireland
- List of townlands of County Tyrone
- Clady, County Londonderry
