= Omagh West =

Omagh West An Ómaigh Thiar (Irish)
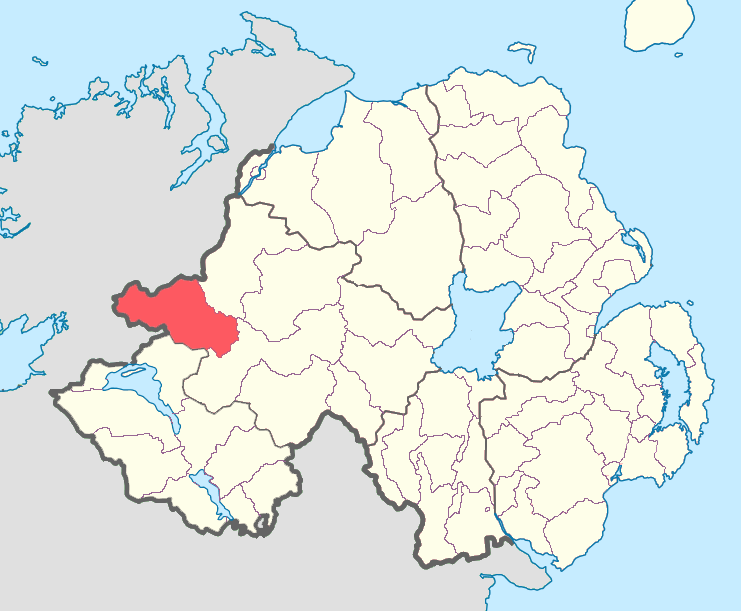
- Location of Omagh West, County Tyrone, Northern Ireland.
- Sovereign state: United Kingdom
- Country: Northern Ireland
- County: Tyrone

Omagh West (named after Omagh town) is a barony in County Tyrone, Northern Ireland. It is bordered by three other baronies in Northern Ireland: Strabane Lower to the north-east; Omagh East to the east; and Lurg to the south. It also borders two baronies in County Donegal in the Republic of Ireland: Tirhugh to the south-west; and Raphoe South to the north-west.

== List of settlements ==
Below is a list of settlements in Omagh West:

=== Towns ===
- Castlederg

=== Population centers ===
- Aghyaran
- Clare
- Dooish
- Drumquin
- Killen
- Killeter
- Mourne Beg

== List of civil parishes ==
Below is a list of civil parishes in Omagh West:

- Ardstraw (split with barony of Strabane Lower)
- Longfield East
- Longfield West
- Termonamongan
- Urney (split with barony of Strabane Lower)
