= Strabane Lower =

Strabane Lower An Srath Bán Íochtarach (Irish)
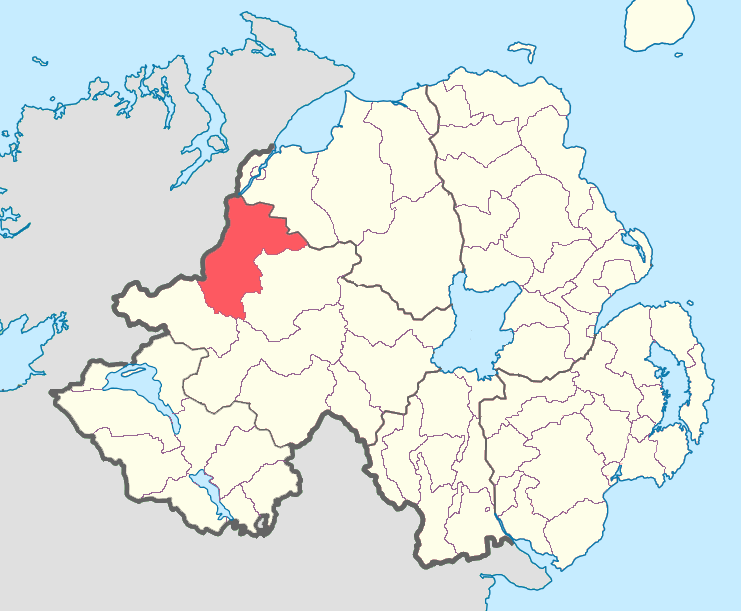
- Location of Strabane Lower, County Tyrone, Northern Ireland.
- Sovereign state: United Kingdom
- Country: Northern Ireland
- County: Tyrone

Strabane Lower (named after Strabane) is a barony in County Tyrone, Northern Ireland. It is bordered by five other baronies in Northern Ireland: North West Liberties of Londonderry to the north; Tirkeeran to the north-east; Strabane Upper to the east; Omagh East to the south; and Omagh West to the south-west. It also borders two baronies in County Donegal in the Republic of Ireland: Raphoe North and Raphoe South to the west.

It was subdivided by 1851 from the earlier Strabane barony.

== List of settlements ==
Below is a list of settlements in Strabane Lower:

=== Towns ===
- Strabane

=== Villages ===
- Ardstraw
- Artigarvan
- Ballymagorry
- Clady
- Donemana
- Newtownstewart
- Sion Mills

== List of civil parishes ==
Below is a list of civil parishes in Strabane Lower:

- Ardstraw (split with barony of Omagh West)
- Camus
- Cumber Upper (mainly in barony of Tirkeeran, one townland in Strabane Lower)
- Donaghedy
- Learmount
- Leckpatrick
- Urney (split with barony of Omagh West)
