= County Tyrone =

County in Northern Ireland

County Tyrone Contae Thír Eoghain (Irish)
- County
- Coat of arms
- Nickname: The Red Hand County
- Motto: Consilio et Prudentia (Latin) "By Wisdom and Prudence"
- Country: United Kingdom
- Constituent country: Northern Ireland
- Province: Ulster
- Established: 1585
- County town: Omagh

Area
  - Total: 1,261 sq mi (3,270 km^{2})
- Highest elevation (Sawel Mountain): 2,224 ft (678 m)

Population (2021)
  - Total: 188,383
  - Rank: 11th
- Time zone: UTC±0 (GMT)
  - Summer (DST): UTC+1 (BST)
- Postcode area: BT
- Contae Thír Eoghain is the Irish name; Countie Tyrone, Coontie Tyrone and Coontie Owenslann are Ulster Scots spellings (the latter used only by Dungannon & South Tyrone Borough Council).

County Tyrone (/tɪˈroʊn/; from Irish Tír Eoghain, meaning 'land of Eoghan' [tʲiːɾʲ ˈoːnʲ]) is one of the six counties of Northern Ireland, one of the nine counties of Ulster and one of the thirty-two traditional counties of Ireland. Its county town is Omagh.

Adjoined to the south-west shore of Lough Neagh, the county covers an area of 1,261 square miles (3,266 km^{2}), making it the largest of Northern Ireland's six counties by size, and the second largest county in Ulster after Donegal. With a population of 188,383 as of the 2021 census, Tyrone is the 5th most populous county in both Northern Ireland and Ulster, and the 11th most populous county on the island of Ireland. The county derives its name and general geographic location from Tír Eoghain, a Gaelic kingdom under the O'Neill dynasty which existed until the 17th century.

== Name ==
The name Tyrone is derived from the Irish Tír Eoghain, meaning 'land of Eoghan', the name given to the conquests made by the Cenél nEógain from the provinces of Airgíalla and Ulaid. Historically, it was anglicised as Tirowen or Tyrowen, which are closer to the Irish pronunciation.

== History ==
Historical population
Year	Pop.	±%
1653	3,988	—
1659	4,088	+2.5%
1821	261,865	+6305.7%
1831	304,468	+16.3%
1841	312,956	+2.8%
1851	255,661	−18.3%
1861	238,500	−6.7%
1871	215,766	−9.5%
1881	197,719	−8.4%
1891	171,401	−13.3%
1901	150,567	−12.2%
1911	142,665	−5.2%
1926	132,792	−6.9%
1937	127,586	−3.9%
1951	132,082	+3.5%
1961	133,919	+1.4%
1966	136,040	+1.6%
1971	139,073	+2.2%
1981	150,729	+8.4%
1991	156,284	+3.7%
2001	164,235	+5.1%
2011	177,986	+8.4%
2021	188,383	+5.8%

Historically Tyrone (then Tír Eoghain or Tirowen) was much larger in size, stretching as far north as Lough Foyle, and comprised part of modern-day County Londonderry east of the River Foyle. The majority of County Londonderry was carved out of Tyrone between 1610 and 1620 when that land went to the Guilds of London to set up profit making schemes based on natural resources located there. Tyrone was the traditional stronghold of the various O'Neill clans and families, the strongest of the Gaelic Irish families in Ulster, surviving into the seventeenth century. The ancient principality of Tír Eoghain, the inheritance of the O'Neills, included the whole of the present counties of Tyrone and Londonderry, and the four baronies of West Inishowen, East Inishowen, Raphoe North and Raphoe South in County Donegal.

In 1608 during O'Doherty's Rebellion areas of the country were plundered and burnt by the forces of Sir Cahir O'Doherty following his destruction of Derry. However, O'Doherty's men avoided the estates of the recently fled Earl of Tyrone around Dungannon, fearing Tyrone's anger if he returned from his exile.

== Geography ==
With an area of 1,261 square miles (3,266 km^{2}), Tyrone is the largest county in Northern Ireland. The flat peatlands of East Tyrone border the shoreline of the largest lake in the British Isles, Lough Neagh, rising gradually across to the more mountainous terrain in the west of the county, the area surrounding the Sperrin Mountains, the highest point being Sawel Mountain at a height of 678 metres (2,224 ft). The length of the county, from the mouth of the River Blackwater at Lough Neagh to the western point near Carrickaduff hill is 55 miles (89 km). The breadth, from the southern corner, southeast of Fivemiletown, to the northeastern corner near Meenard Mountain is 37.5 miles (60.4 km); giving an area of 1,261 sq mi (3,270 km^{2}). Annaghone lays claim to be the geographical centre of Northern Ireland.

Tyrone is connected by land to the counties of Fermanagh to the southwest; Monaghan to the south; Armagh to the southeast; Londonderry to the north; and Donegal to the west. Across Lough Neagh to the east, it borders County Antrim. It is the eighth largest of Ireland's thirty-two counties by area and tenth largest by population. It is the second largest of Ulster's nine traditional counties by area and fourth largest by population.

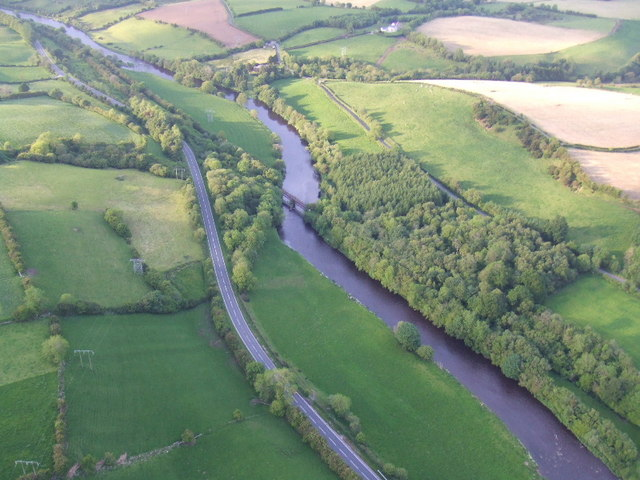
Blackrock Bridge near Newtownstewart, carrying the closed GNR mainline that ran through the county

== Administration ==
The county was administered by Tyrone County Council from 1899 until the abolition of county councils in Northern Ireland in 1973.

== Demography ==
Religious Background in Tyrone (2021)
Religion	Per cent
Catholic	66.5%
Protestant and Other Christian	28.9%
None	4.0%
Other faiths	0.7%

It is one of four counties in Northern Ireland which currently has a majority of the population from a Catholic community background, according to the 2021 census. In 1900 County Tyrone had a population of 197,719, while in 2021 it was 188,383. At the time of the 2021 census, 66.49% were from a Catholic background, 28.88% were from a Protestant and Other Christian (including Christian related), 0.66% were from other religions, and 3.97% had no religious background.

Religion or religion brought up in (2021 Census)
Religion or religion brought up in	Number	%
Catholic	125,251	66.49%
Protestant and Other Christian	54,407	28.88%
Other religions	1,251	0.66%
None (no religion)	7,474	3.97%
Total	188,383	100.00%

National identity (2021 Census)
National identity	Number	(%)
Irish only	78,291	41.6%
British only	39,551	21.0%
Northern Irish only	38,698	20.5%
British and Northern Irish only	8,197	4.4%
Irish and Northern Irish only	3,853	2.1%
British, Irish and Northern Irish only	1,175	0.6%
British and Irish only	737	0.4%
Other identity	17,881	9.5%
Total	188,383	100.0%
All Irish identities	84,562	44.9%
All British identities	50,768	27.0%
All Northern Irish identities	52,667	28.0%

=== Irish language and Ulster Scots ===
In the 2021 UK census in County Tyrone:

- 18.44% claim to have some knowledge of the Irish language, whilst 5.84% claim to be able to speak, read, write and understand spoken Irish. 3.62% claim to use Irish daily. 0.38% claim that Irish is their main language.
- 8.15% claim to have some knowledge of Ulster Scots, whilst 0.91% claim to be able to speak, read, write and understand spoken Ulster Scots. 1.26% claim to use Ulster Scots daily.

== Settlements ==
=== Large towns ===
(population of 18,000 or more and under 75,000 at 2021 Census)

- Omagh

=== Medium towns ===
(population of 10,000 or more and under 18,000 at 2021 Census)

- Cookstown
- Dungannon
- Strabane

=== Small towns ===
(population of 4,500 or more and under 10,000 at 2021 Census)

- Coalisland

=== Intermediate settlements ===
(population of 2,250 or more and under 4,500 at 2021 Census)

- Castlederg

=== Villages ===
(population of 1,000 or more and under 2,250 at 2001 Census)

- Ardboe
- Aughnacloy
- Carrickmore
- Dromore
- Fintona
- Fivemiletown
- Killyclogher
- Moy
- Newtownstewart
- Sion Mills

=== Small villages ===
(population of less than 1,000 at 2001 Census)

- Altamuskin
- Altmore
- Ardstraw
- Artigarvan
- Augher
- Ballygawley
- Ballymagorry
- Benburb
- Beragh
- Bready
- Brockagh
- Caledon
- Clady
- Clogher
- Clonoe
- Coagh
- Derryloughan
- Derrytresk
- Donaghmore
- Donemana
- Drumquin
- Edenderry
- Eglish
- Erganagh
- Eskra
- Evish
- Glenmornan
- Gortin
- Greencastle
- Killyclogher
- Loughmacrory
- Kildress
- Plumbridge
- Pomeroy
- Rock
- Sixmilecross
- Stewartstown
- Tamnamore
- Trillick
- Tullyhogue
- Victoria Bridge

== Subdivisions ==
Baronies

- Clogher
- Dungannon Lower
- Dungannon Middle
- Dungannon Upper
- Omagh East
- Omagh West
- Strabane Lower
- Strabane Upper

Parishes

Townlands

== Future railway revival ==
There is the possibility of the line being reopened to Dungannon railway station from Portadown.

== Sport ==
Major sports in Tyrone include Gaelic games, association football, rugby union and cricket:

- Gaelic football is more widely played than hurling in Tyrone. The Tyrone GAA football side has had considerable success since 2000, winning four All Ireland titles (in 2003, 2005, 2008 and 2021). They have also won sixteen Ulster titles (1956, 1957, 1973, 1984, 1986, 1989, 1995, 1996, 2001, 2003, 2007, 2009, 2010, 2016, 2017 and 2021) and two National League titles (in 2002 and 2003).
- Association football also has a large following in Tyrone. Omagh Town F.C. were members of the Irish Football League until they folded in 2005 due to financial problems. Dungannon Swifts F.C. compete in the NIFL Premiership – the top division. Other teams include NIFL Championship side Dergview F.C.
- Rugby union is very popular in the county. Dungannon RFC, Omagh Academicals RFC and Clogher Valley RFC play in the All-Ireland League. Other teams include Cookstown RFC and Strabane RFC.
- International Cricket is also played on the Bready Cricket Club Ground which is owned by Bready Cricket Club. It is Ireland's fourth venue for International Cricket hosting its first International Cricket match when Ireland played against Scotland in a series of T20I matches in June 2015. It was selected as a venue to host matches in the 2015 ICC World Twenty20 Qualifier tournament.

== Notable people ==
- Philomena Begley, Irish country music singer
- James E. Boyd, seventh governor of Nebraska
- Paul Brady, musician
- Conor Bradley, footballer
- Colin Broderick, author and filmographer
- William Burke (1792–1829), grave robber and murderer
- Peter Canavan, former All Ireland Tyrone captain
- William Carleton (1794–1869), writer
- Chipzel, musician
- Darren Clarke, professional golfer
- Tom Clarke, Irish Republican and leader of the 1916 Easter Rising
- Jimmy Cricket, comedian
- Sidney Elisabeth Croskery, doctor
- Austin Currie, politician, founding member SDLP; Member of Parliament (MP) and later Teachta Dála (TD)
- Janet Devlin, soul and pop artist and contestant on The X Factor (UK)
- Ryan Dolan, Ireland representative at the Eurovision Song Contest 2013
- Brian Dooher, former captain of the Tyrone senior football team
- Hugo Duncan, singer and broadcaster on BBC Radio Ulster
- John Dunlap (1747–1812), publisher of the first American daily newspaper the Pennsylvania Packet in 1784, also the printer of the American Declaration of Independence
- Brian Friel, dramatist and theatre director
- Sylvia Hermon, Member of Parliament for North Down, born in Galbally, County Tyrone
- Aaron Hughes, captain of the Northern Ireland football team
- John Hughes (1797–1864), first Archbishop of Roman Catholic Diocese of New York
- Martin Hurson, Irish Republican
- Ryan Kelly, singer with Celtic Thunder
- Benedict Kiely (1919–2007), writer and broadcaster
- Conor McKenna, AFL Player for the Brisbane Lions
- Gerry McKenna MRIA (1953–), biologist; Vice Chancellor and President, University of Ulster; Senior Vice President, Royal Irish Academy
- William McMaster (1811–1887), founder of Canadian Bank of Commerce and namesake of McMaster University
- Mary Mallon (1869–1938), more commonly known as Typhoid Mary
- W. F. Marshall (1888–1954), the 'Bard of Tyrone', Presbyterian minister, author and poet
- Thomas Mellon, founder of Mellon Bank, now Bank of New York Mellon
- Sister Nivedita (1867–1911), Irish social activist
- Flann O'Brien (1911–1966), writer
- Dominic Ó Mongain (c.1715–1770s), poet and harpist
- Arthur O'Neill (c.1737–1816), travelling blind Irish harpist
- Hugh O'Neill, Earl of Tyrone (Aodh Mór Ó Néill) (c.1550–1616), Irish leader during the Nine Years' War
- Thomas Porter, member of the Wisconsin State Assembly
- Martha M. Simpson (1864–1948), educationalist
- Victor Sloan, visual artist
- Ivan Sproule, retired footballer
- Dennis Taylor, former world snooker champion
- John K. Tener, former baseball player and Governor of Pennsylvania. Creator of Congressional Baseball Game.

== See also ==
- Abbeys and priories in Northern Ireland (County Tyrone)
- High Sheriff of Tyrone
- List of civil parishes of County Tyrone
- List of places in County Tyrone
- List of townlands in County Tyrone
- Lord Lieutenant of Tyrone
- Ulster American Folk Park
- The Moorlough Shore
- List of archaeological sites in County Tyrone

== Sources ==
- Pointon, GE (1990), BBC Pronouncing Dictionary of British Names (2nd ed.), Oxford: Oxford University Press, p. 92, ISBN 0-19-282745-6
