= Braniel =

Coordinates: 54.579°N 5.866°W

Braniel: Irish: an Braineal; The Braniel
- Location within County Down
- Population: 4,741 (2011 Census)
- County: County Down
- Country: Northern Ireland
- Sovereign state: United Kingdom
- Post town: Belfast
- Postcode district: BT5
- Dialling code: 028
- Police: Northern Ireland
- Fire: Northern Ireland
- Ambulance: Northern Ireland
- UK Parliament: East Belfast
- NI Assembly: East Belfast

Braniel or The Braniel is a large housing estate and townland in southeast Belfast, Northern Ireland. It is in the barony of Castlereagh Upper and parish of Knockbreda in County Down. Two small developments, Roddens and Glenview, are located in the area, and are often referred to the Braniel. It is a predominantly unionist area.

== History ==
The name 'Braniel' comes from the Irish Broinngheal ("bright front") or Bruach Uí Néill ("O'Neill's slope/bank"). These likely refer to Braniel Hill.

The Entrance to the Braniel is via the Knock Road and the Ballygowan Road or through the Gilnahirk route. Nearby estates include Church Road (Rosewood, Rosemount, Gray Castle, Marlborough), Gilnahirk, Tullycarnet, Clarawood, Clonduff, Casaeldona and Cregagh.

In 2001, a man was murdered on Ravenswood Park, at the end entering the Braniel Square.

In 2008, a man was stabbed on Whincroft Road, one of the main roads into Braniel Square. A 28-year-old man was then arrested and given bail following the event.

On 13 March 2012, a man drove through the front of a house on Whincroft Road. No further details have been released at this time though it is believed the man had a heart attack or blacked out at the steering wheel of his Citroen Picasso before driving through the front of 13 Whincroft Road.

On 10 July 2026, Warren Lyttle fell from a bonfire that was being prepared for The Twelfth of July. He subsequently died in hospital. The incident was reported to the Health and Safety Executive for Northern Ireland by the police.

=== Fires ===
==== 2009 ====
On 11 April 2009 Braniel Primary school was set on fire by arsonists. The fire started in a bin area at the side of the school and spread to the roof of the school. It was extinguished and only the bin area, fencing and roof were damaged. The School assembly hall was also slightly damaged inside. The fire cost around £10,000 in damages.

==== 2011 ====
On 7 January 2011, a flat in the estate caught fire, a baby inside and four other people were saved.

== Services ==
- Braniel Primary School, educates over 400 children.
- Braniel Church, which hosts both a Methodist and Presbyterian congregation.

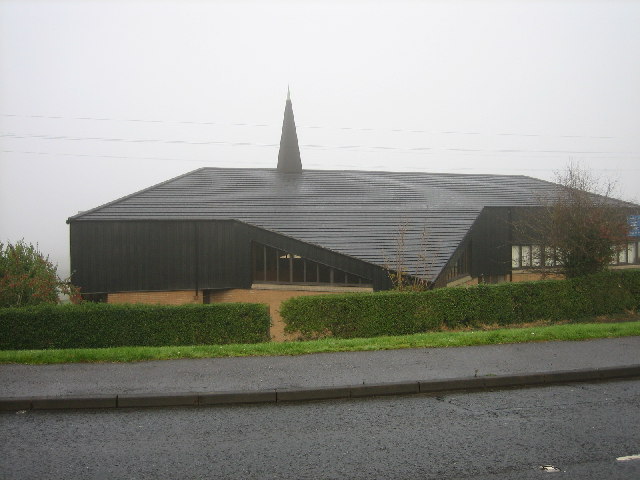
Braniel Church in 2005

- Braniel Football Pitch, re-placed the Braniel Bowling Green
- Braniel Community Centre, for community events and other activities. The B.C.A hold events and meetings here.
- Braniel Bowling Green, 1980s – 2011, removed in favour of a new football pitch.
- Braniel Library, Closed 2010, a mobile Library now visits the car park at the Glenside Shops.
- Braniel Football Club, various football teams
- Braniel Community Church, located at St Brigid's Hall on the Lower Braniel Road

=== Parks ===
- Carema Allen Memorial Park, at the top of the estate. Better known as Braniel Park or Sam's Park.
- Roddens Park, Located in Roddens. Not to be confused with a nearby street with the same name.

== Notable people ==
- Michael Stone, best known for the Milltown Cemetery attack and trying to break into the Parliament Buildings.
- John Wilson, drummer in many bands, including Taste grew up on the estate.

== Dreamscheme: Braniel ==
In 2009, the Braniel Dreamscheme painted a new mural over an old graffitied wall near the Braniel Park, on the back of the Braniel row of shops. The Dreamscheme is still an ongoing activity in the estate.
