= Tower block =

Tall building

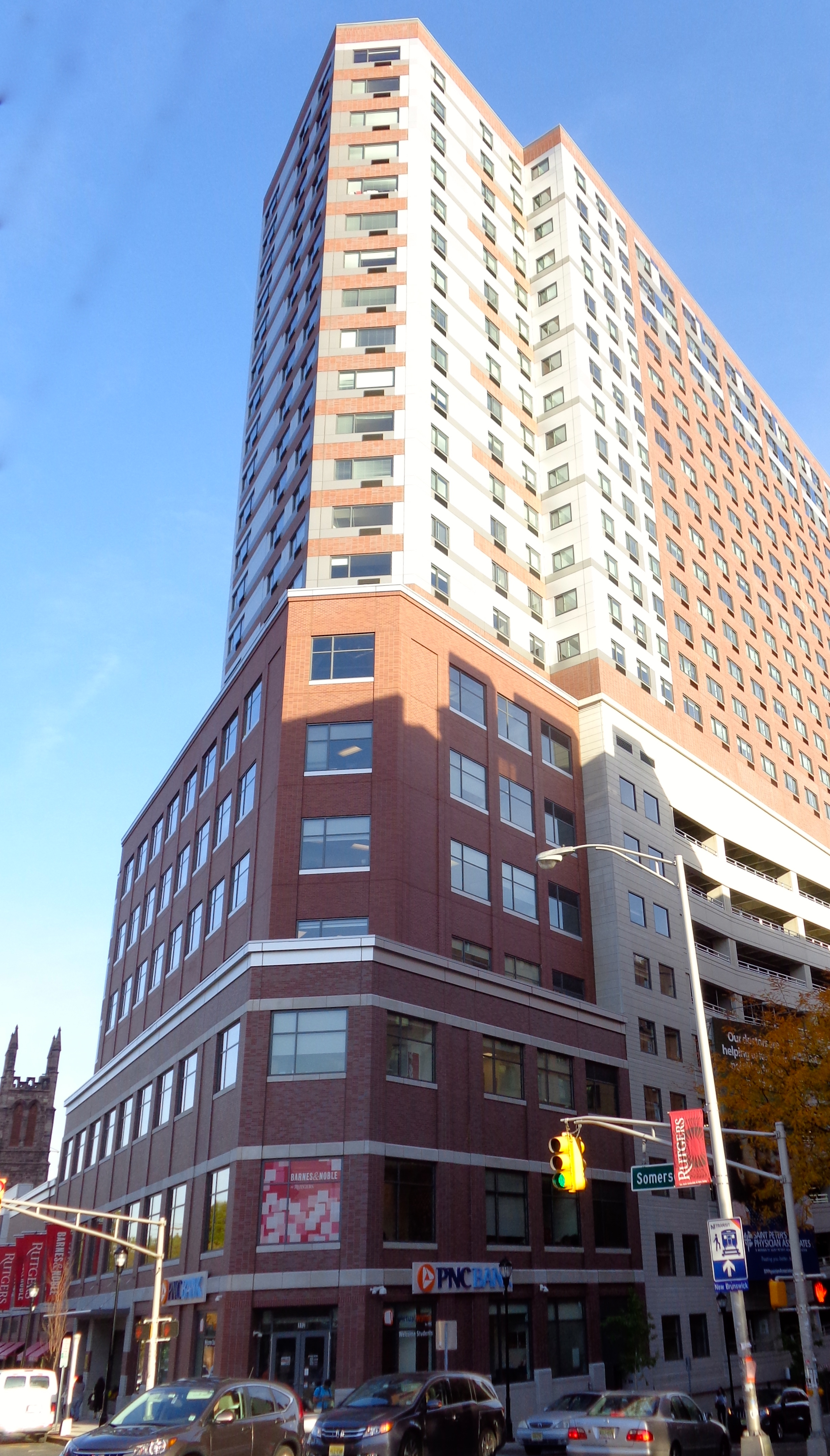
A newer high-rise tower in downtown New Brunswick, New Jersey, known as the Hub City. High-rise towers often anchor central business districts.

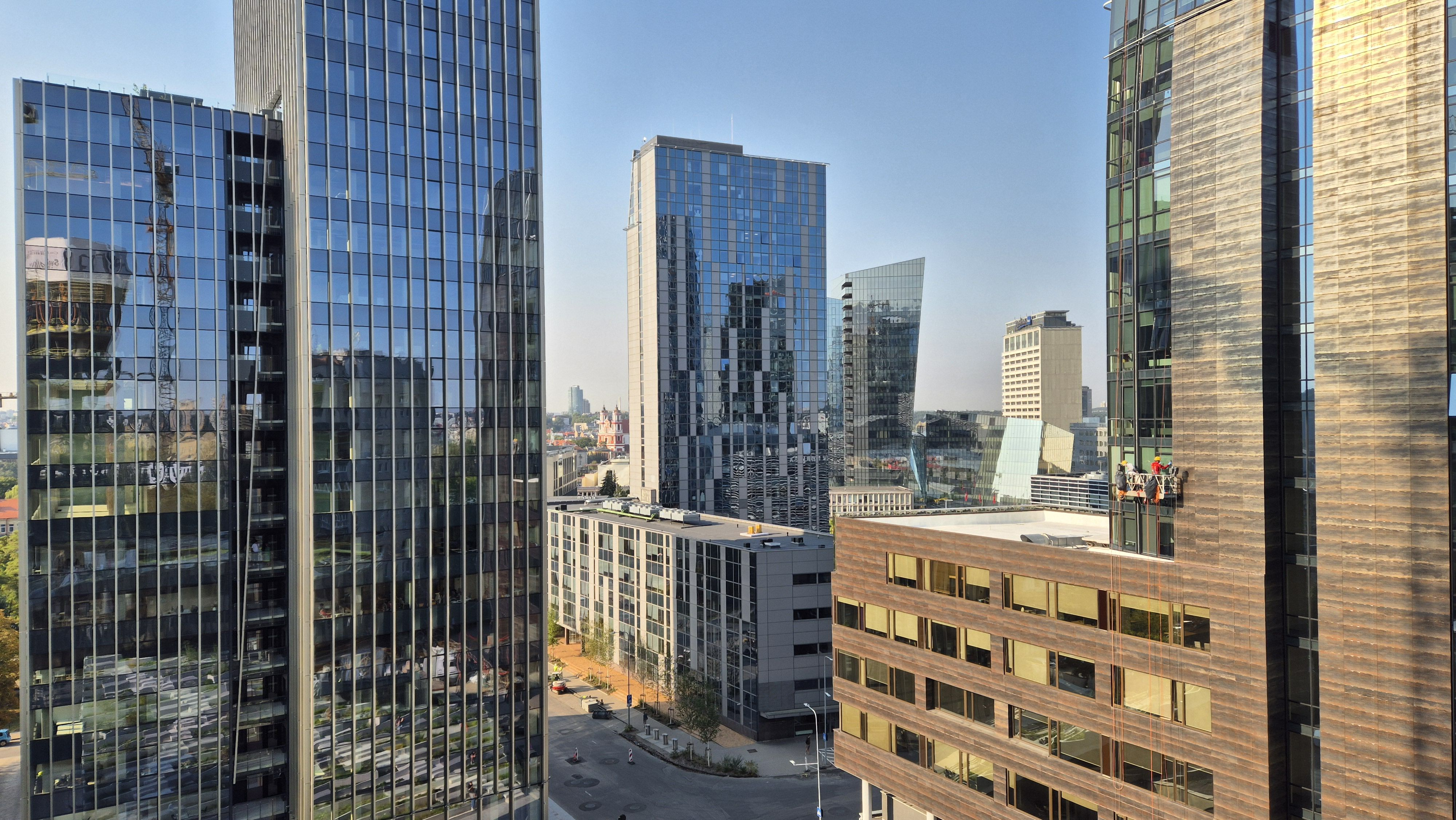
High-rise towers in Vilnius Central Business District, Lithuania

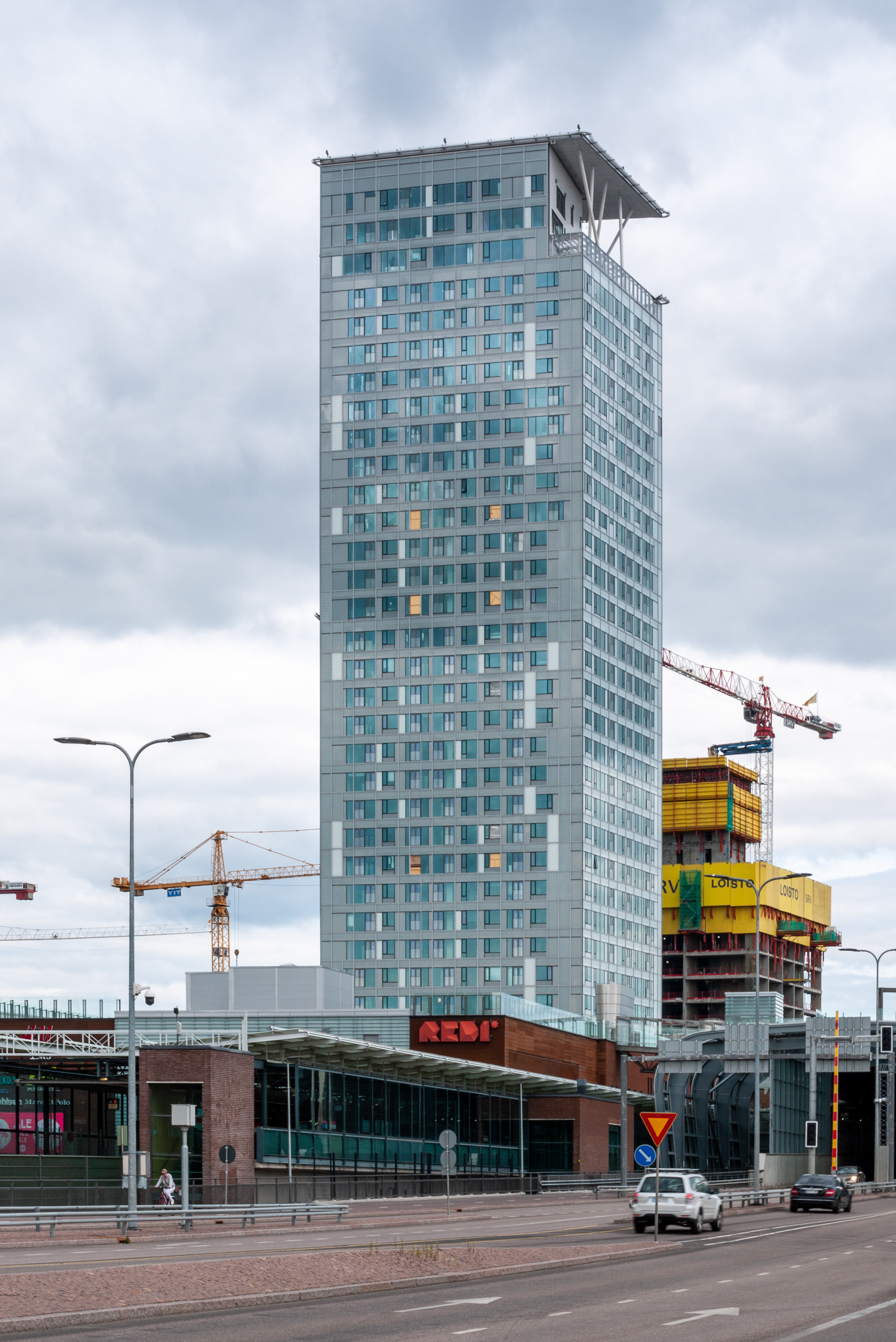
The Majakka high-rise building in Kalasatama, Helsinki, Finland

The first high-rise in Jakarta, Indonesia was Wisma 46 (262 m), which held the longest record, of 20 years, as the highest building in Jakarta.

A tower block, high-rise, apartment tower, residential tower, apartment block, block of flats, or office tower is a tall building, as opposed to a low-rise building; it is defined differently in terms of height depending on the jurisdiction. It is used as a residential or office building, or has other functions, including hotel, retail, or with multiple purposes combined. Residential high-rise buildings are also known in some varieties of English, such as British English, as tower blocks and may be referred to as MDUs, standing for multi-dwelling units. A very tall high-rise building is referred to as a skyscraper.

High-rise buildings became possible to construct with the invention of the elevator (lift) and with less expensive, more abundant building materials. The materials used for the structural system of high-rise buildings are reinforced concrete and steel. Most North American–style skyscrapers have a steel frame, while residential blocks are usually constructed of concrete. There is no clear difference between a tower block and a skyscraper, although a building with forty or more stories and taller than 150 metres (490 ft) is generally considered a skyscraper.

High-rise structures pose particular design challenges for structural and geotechnical engineers, particularly if situated in a seismically active region or if the underlying soils have geotechnical risk factors such as high compressibility or bay mud. They also pose serious challenges to firefighters during emergencies in high-rise structures. New and old building design, building systems such as the building standpipe system, HVAC systems (heating, ventilation and air conditioning), fire sprinkler systems, and other things such as stairwell and elevator evacuations pose significant problems. Studies are often required to ensure that pedestrian wind comfort and wind danger concerns are addressed. In order to allow less wind exposure, to transmit more daylight to the ground and to appear more slender, many high-rises have a design with setbacks.

Apartment buildings have technical and economic advantages in areas of high population density, and have become a distinctive feature of housing accommodation in virtually all densely populated urban areas around the world. In contrast with low-rise and single-family houses, apartment blocks accommodate more inhabitants per unit of area of land and decrease the cost of municipal infrastructure.

== Definition ==
Various bodies have defined "high-rise":

- Emporis defines a high-rise as "A multi-story structure between 35–100 metres (115–328 ft) tall, or a building of unknown height from 12–39 floors."
- The New Shorter Oxford English Dictionary defines a high-rise as "a building having many storeys".
- The International Conference on Fire Safety in High-Rise Buildings defined a high-rise as "any structure where the height can have a serious impact on evacuation"
- In the U.S., the National Fire Protection Association defines a high-rise as being higher than 75 feet (23 m), or about seven stories.
- Most building engineers, inspectors, architects and similar professionals define a high-rise as a building that is at least 75 feet (23 m) tall.

== History ==
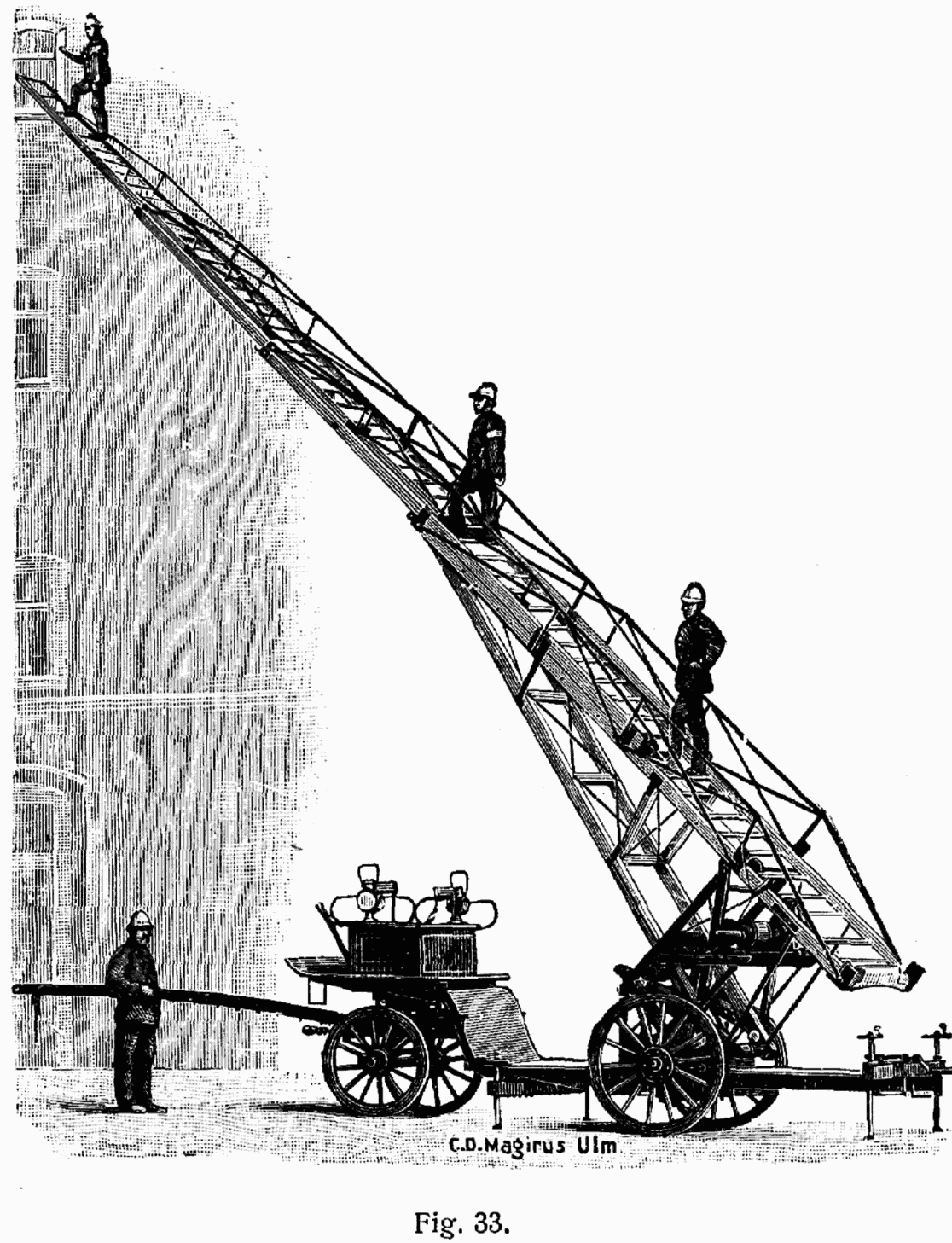
Sliding ladder for firefighters in 1904

High-rise apartment buildings had already appeared in antiquity: the insulae in Ancient Rome and several other cities in the Roman Empire, some of which might have reached up to ten or more stories, one reportedly having 200 stairs. Because of the destruction caused by poorly built high-rise insulae collapsing, several Roman emperors, beginning with Augustus (r. 30 BC – 14 AD), set limits of 20–25 metres (66–82 ft) for multi-story buildings, but met with limited success, as these limits were often ignored despite the likelihood of taller insulae collapsing. The lower floors were typically occupied by either shops or wealthy families, while the upper stories were rented out to the lower classes. Surviving Oxyrhynchus Papyri indicate that seven-story buildings even existed in provincial towns, such as in third century AD Hermopolis in Roman Egypt.

In Arab Egypt, the initial capital city of Fustat housed many high-rise residential buildings, some seven stories tall that could reportedly accommodate hundreds of people. Al-Muqaddasi, in the 10th century, described them as resembling minarets, while Nasir Khusraw, in the early 11th century, described some of them rising up to 14 stories, with roof gardens on the top story complete with ox-drawn water wheels for irrigating them. By the 16th century, Cairo also had high-rise apartment buildings where the two lower floors were for commercial and storage purposes and the multiple stories above them were rented out to tenants.

The skyline of many important medieval cities was dominated by large numbers of high-rising urban towers, which fulfilled defensive but also representative purposes. The residential Towers of Bologna numbered between 80 and 100 at a time, the largest of which still rise to 97.2 m (319 ft). In Florence, a law of 1251 decreed that all urban buildings should be reduced to a height of less than 26 m (85 ft), the regulation immediately put into effect. Even medium-sized towns such as San Gimignano are known to have featured 72 towers up to 51 m (167 ft) in height.

The Hakka people in southern China have adopted communal living structures designed to be easily defensible in the forms of weilongwu (围龙屋), as well as (yuanzhai) tulou [(園寨)土楼], often abbreviated to yuanlou [園楼]; the latter are large, enclosed and fortified earth buildings, between two (though usually at least three) and five stories high and housing up to 80 families. The oldest tulou still standing dates from the 14th century.

High-rises were built in the Yemeni city of Shibam in the 16th century. The houses of Shibam are all made of mud bricks, but about five hundred of them are tower houses, which rise five to sixteen stories high, with each floor having one or two apartments. This technique of building was implemented to protect residents from Bedouin attacks. While Shibam has existed for around two thousand years, most of the city's houses date from the 16th century. The city has the tallest mud buildings in the world, some more than 30 meters (100 feet) high. Shibam has been called "one of the oldest and best examples of urban planning based on the principle of vertical construction" or "Manhattan of the desert".

The engineer's definition of high-rise buildings comes from the development of fire trucks in the late 19th century. Magirus had shown the first cogwheel sliding ladder in 1864. The first turntable ladder drawn by horses was developed in 1892 which had a length of 25 meters (82 ft). The extension ladder was motorized by Magirus in 1904. A limit of 22 meters (72 ft) for the highest floor was common in building regulations at that time and it still remains so in Germany. The common height for turntable ladders later increased to 32 meters (105 feet), so that 30 meters (98 ft) is a common limit in some building regulations, for example in Switzerland. Any building that exceeds the height of the usual turntable ladders in a city must install additional fire safety equipment, so that these high-rise buildings have a different section in the building regulations in the world.

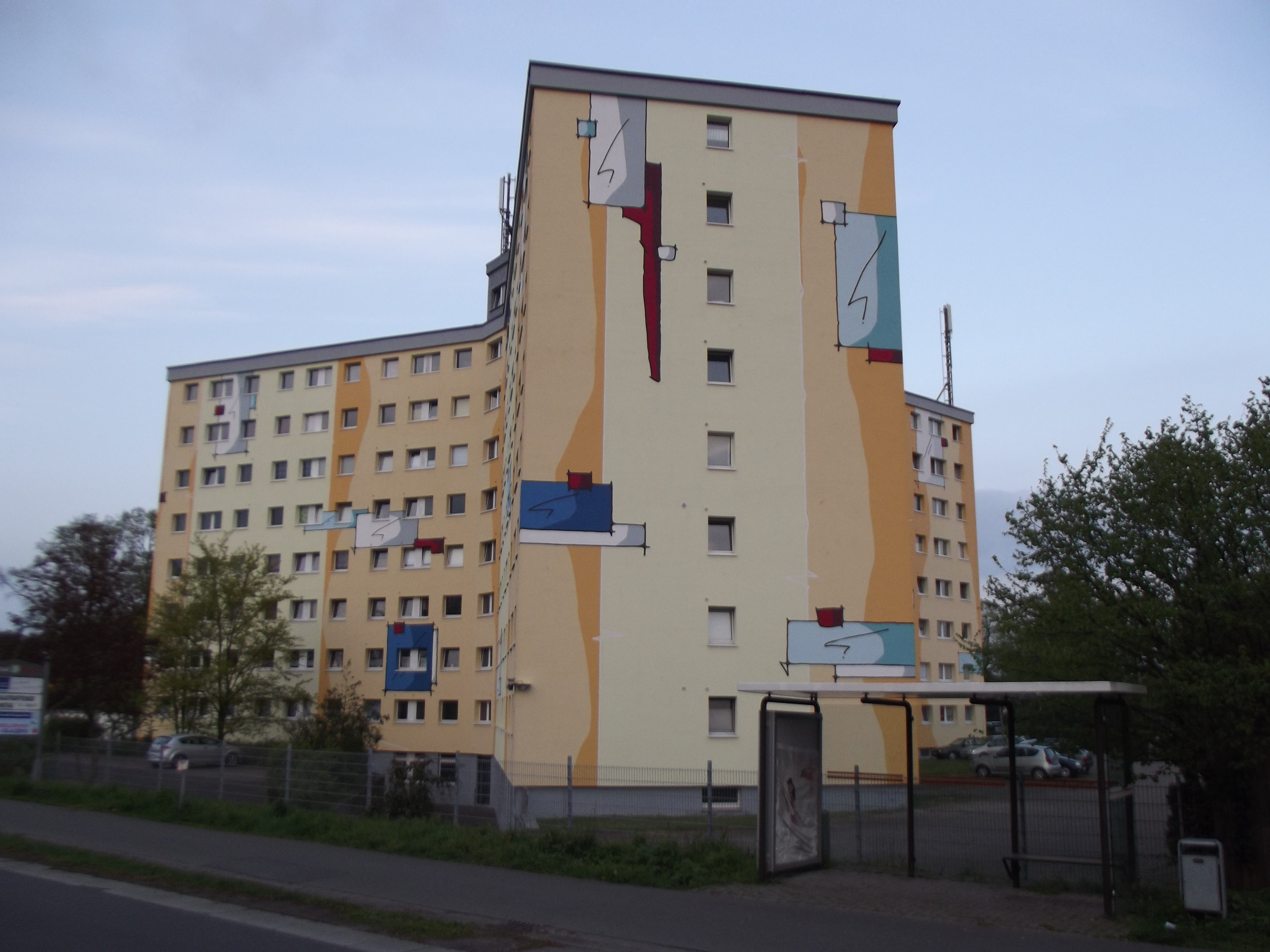
A residential block in Steinfurt, Westphalia, Germany, forming a "Y"

The residential tower block with its typical concrete construction is a familiar feature of Modernist architecture. Influential examples include Le Corbusier's "housing unit", his Unité d'Habitation, repeated in various European cities starting with his Cité radieuse in Marseille (1947–52), constructed of béton brut, rough-cast concrete, as steel for framework was unavailable in post-war France. Residential tower blocks became standard in housing urban populations displaced by slum clearances and "urban renewal". High-rise projects after World War II typically rejected the classical designs of the early skyscrapers, instead embracing the uniform international style; many older skyscrapers were redesigned to suit contemporary tastes or even got demolished - such as New York's Singer Building, once the world's tallest skyscraper. However, with the movements of Postmodernism, New Urbanism, and New Classical Architecture, that established since the 1980s, a more classical approach came back to global skyscraper design, that is popular today.

Other contemporary styles and movements in high-rise design include organic, sustainable, neo-futurist, structuralist, high-tech, deconstructivist, blob, digital, streamline, novelty, critical regionalist, vernacular, Art Deco (or Art Deco Nouveau), and neohistorist, also known as revivalist.

Currently, the tallest high-rise apartment building in the world is the Central Park Tower on Billionaires' Row in Midtown Manhattan, towering at 1,550 feet (470 m).

=== Streets in the sky ===
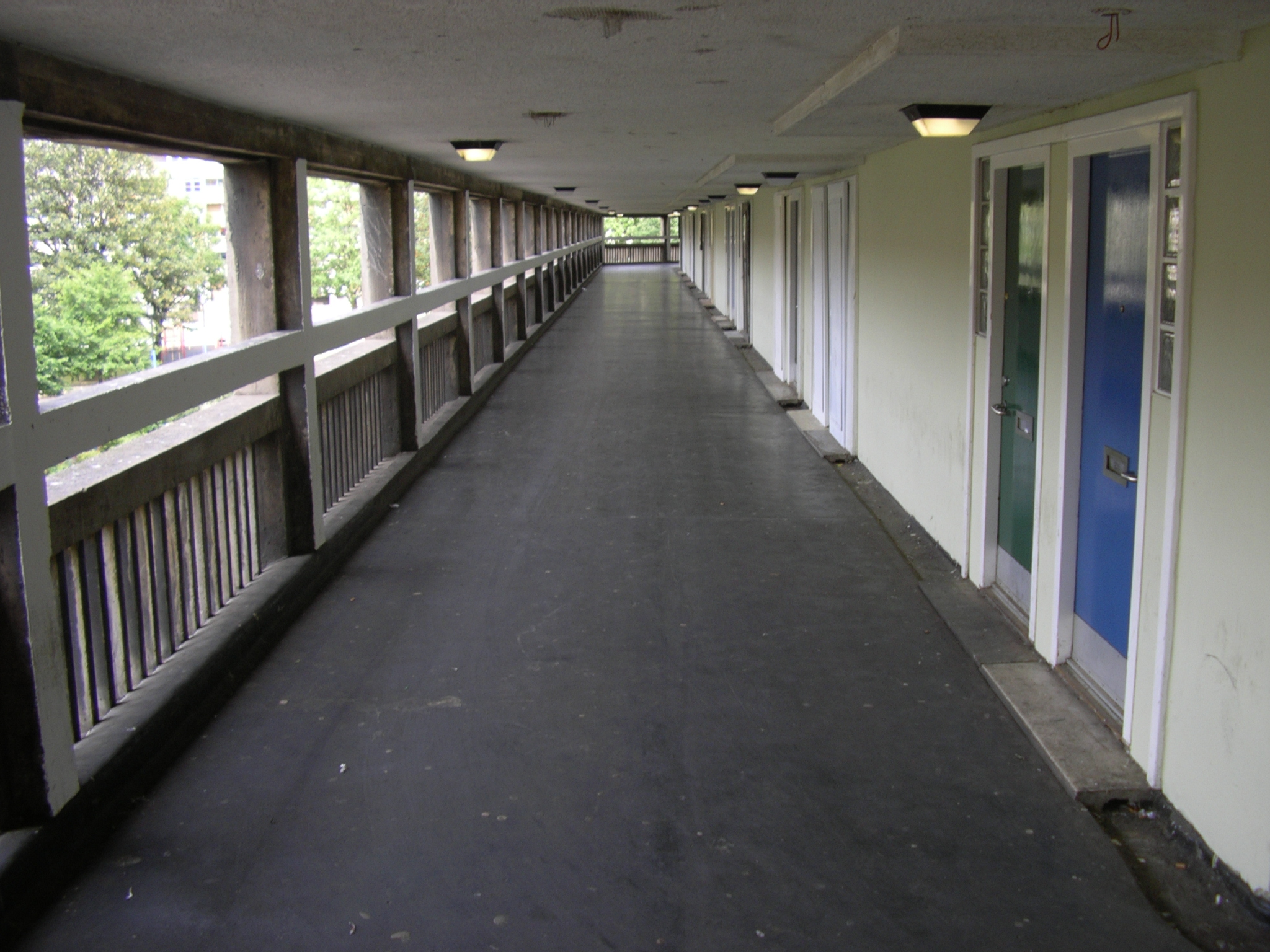
"Street in the sky" at Park Hill

Streets in the sky is a style of architecture that emerged in Britain in the 1960s and 1970s. Generally built to replace run-down terraced housing, the new designs included not only modern improvements such as inside toilets, but also shops and other community facilities within high-rise blocks. Examples of the buildings and developments are Trellick Tower, Balfron Tower, Broadwater Farm, Robin Hood Gardens and Keeling House in London, Hunslet Grange in Leeds and Park Hill, Sheffield, and Castlefields and Southgate Estate, Runcorn. These were an attempt to develop a new architecture, differentiated from earlier large housing estates, such as Quarry Hill flats in Leeds. Alison and Peter Smithson were the architects of Robin Hood Gardens. As another large example, in 2005 it was decided to carry out a 20-year process of demolition and replacement of dwellings with modern houses in the Aylesbury Estate in south London, built in 1970. The Hulme Crescents in Manchester were the largest social housing scheme in Europe when built in 1972 but lasted just 22 years. The Crescents had one of the worst reputations of any British social housing schemes and were marred by numerous design and practical problems.

The ideal of Streets in the Sky worked rarely in practice. Unlike an actual city street, these walkways were not thoroughfares, and often came to a dead end multiple storeys above the ground. They lacked a regular flow of passers-by, and the walkways and especially the stairwells could not be seen by anyone elsewhere, so there was no deterrent to crime and disorder. There were no "eyes on the street" as advocated by Jane Jacobs in her book The Death and Life of Great American Cities. The Unité d'Habitation in Marseille provides a more successful example of the concept, with the fifth floor walkway including a shop and café.

=== Towers in the park and microdistricts ===
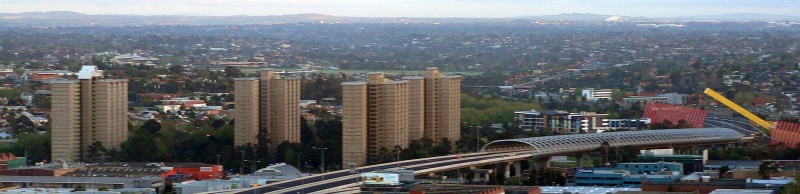
Debney Meadows (Flemington Estate) (1962–1965) in Melbourne.
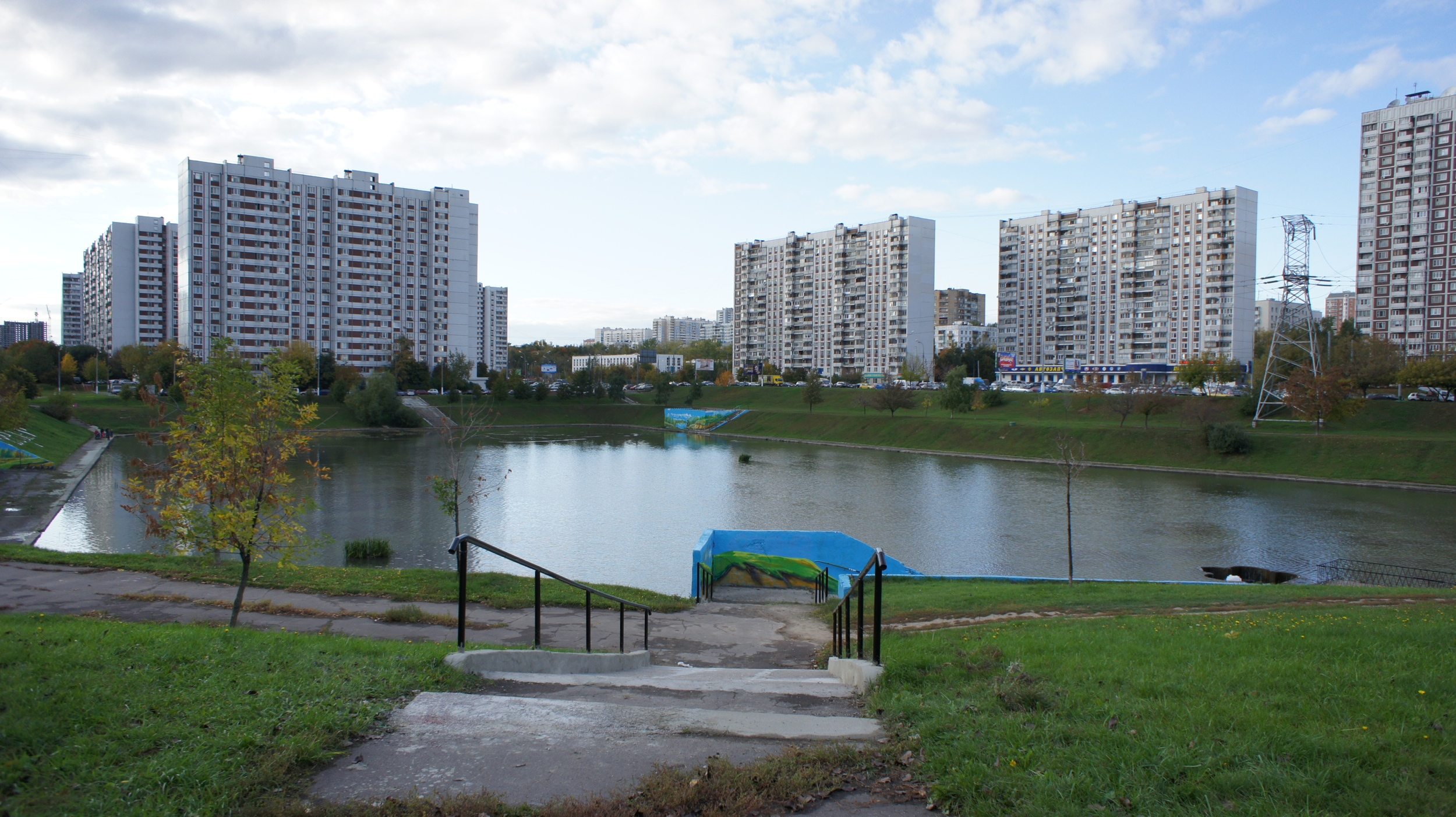
A panel housing microdistrict in Chertanovo Severnoye District of Moscow is built with a similar idea in mind

Towers in the park is a morphology of modernist high-rise apartment buildings characterized by a high-rise building surrounded by a swath of landscaped land; e.g., the tower does not directly front the street.

It is based on an ideology popularised by Le Corbusier with the Plan Voisin, an expansion of the Garden city movement aimed at reducing the problem of urban congestion. It was introduced in several large cities across the world, notably in North America, Europe and Australia as a solution for housing, especially for public housing, reaching a peak of popularity in the 1960s with the introduction of prefabrication technology.

By the early 1970s, opposition to this style of towers mounted, with many, including urban planners, now referring to them as "ghettos". Neighbourhoods like St. James Town were originally designed to house young "swinging single" middle class residents, but the apartments lacked appeal and the area quickly became much poorer. From its early days of implementation the concept was criticised for making residents feel unsafe, including large empty common areas dominated by gang culture and crime. The layout was criticised for normalising anti-social behaviour and hampering the efforts of essential services, particularly for law enforcement.

The history of microdistricts as an urban planning concept dates back to the 1920s, when the Soviet Union underwent rapid urbanization. Under the Soviet urban planning ideologies of the 1920s, residential complexes—compact territories with residential dwellings, schools, shops, entertainment facilities, and green spaces—started to prevail in urban planning practice, as they allowed for more careful and efficient planning of the rapid urban expansion. These complexes were seen as an opportunity to build a collective society, an environment suitable and necessary for the new way of life.

== Developments by region ==
=== Asia ===
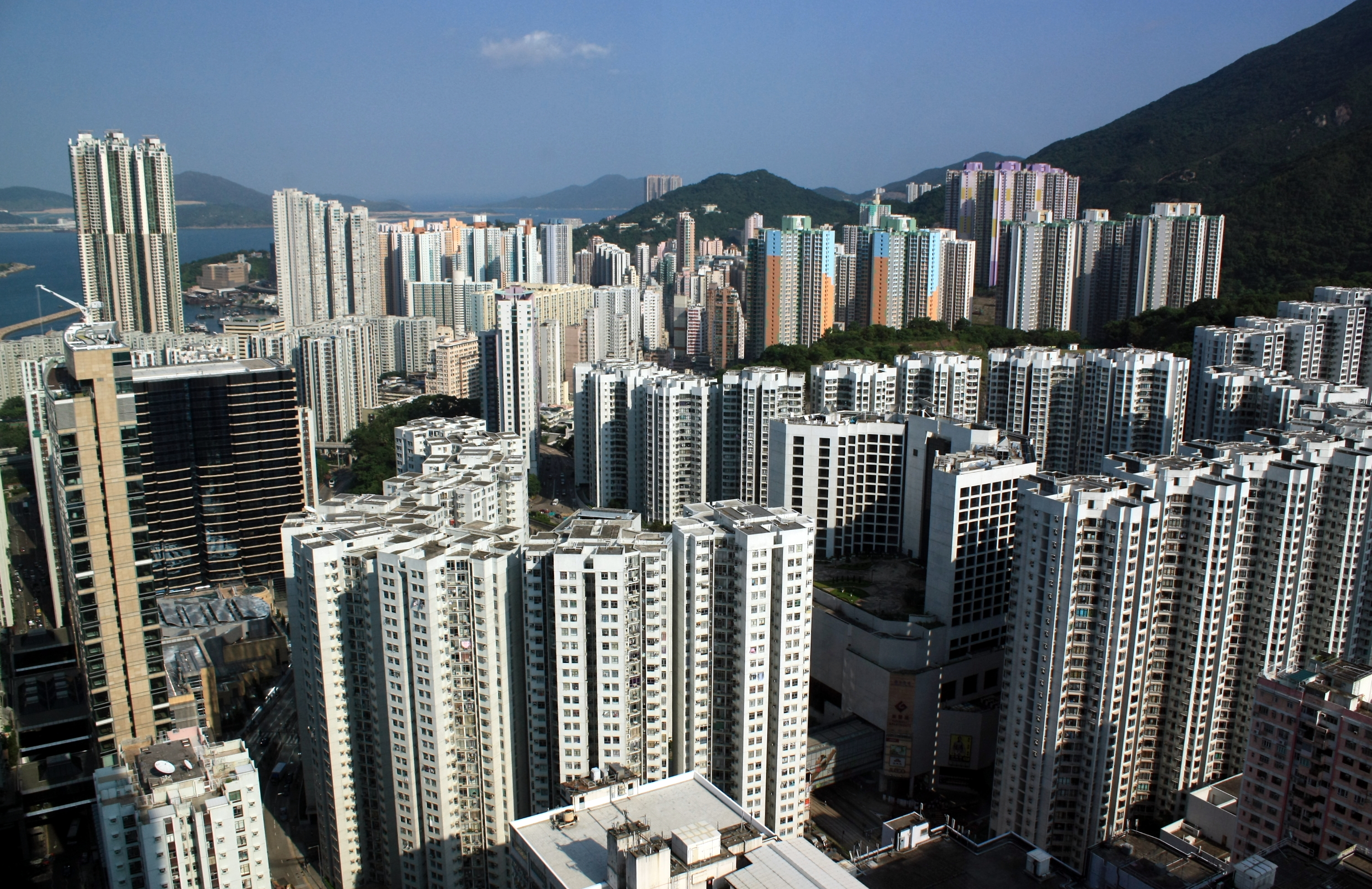
High-rise buildings, Hong Kong

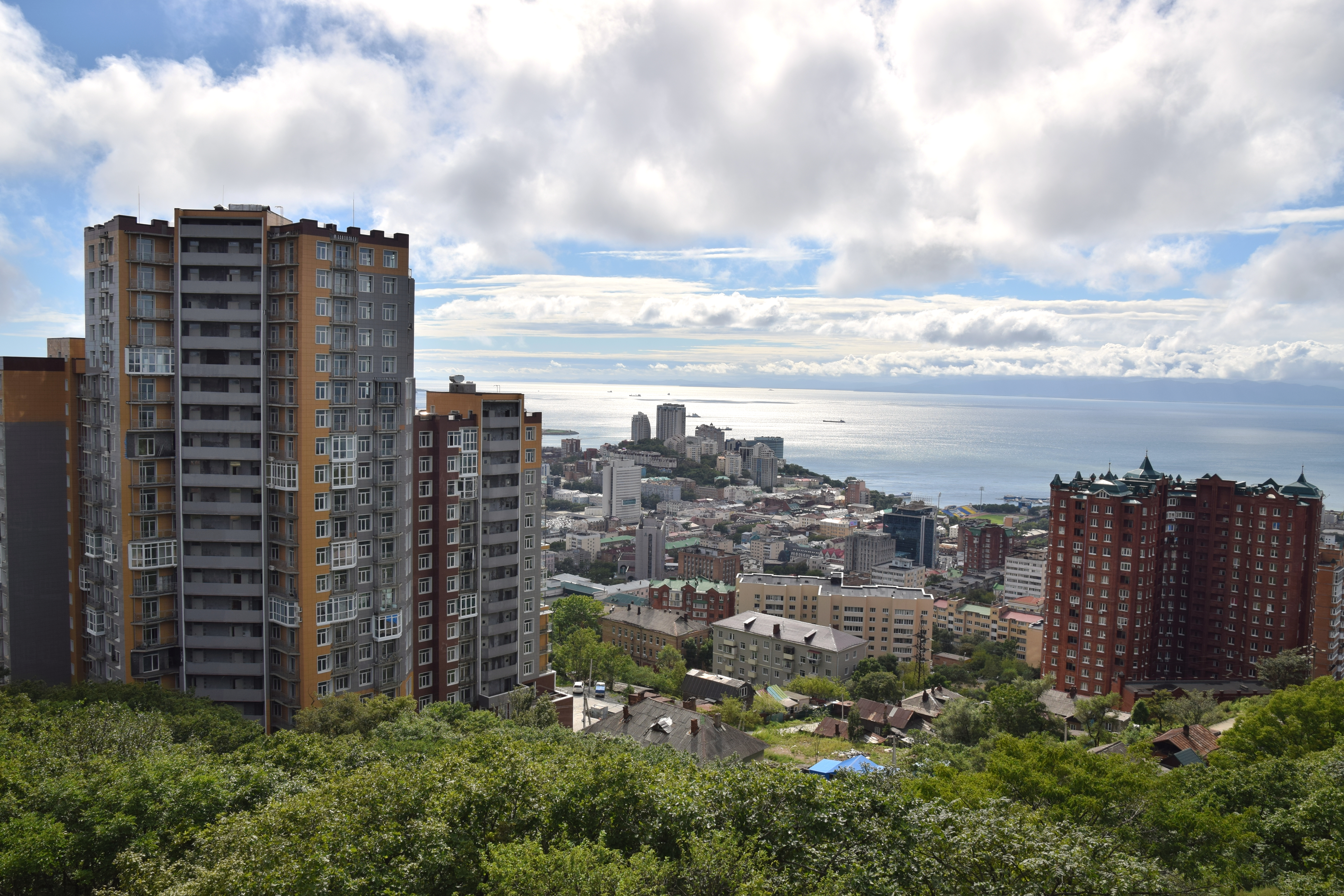
Modern towers of Vladivostok, Russia

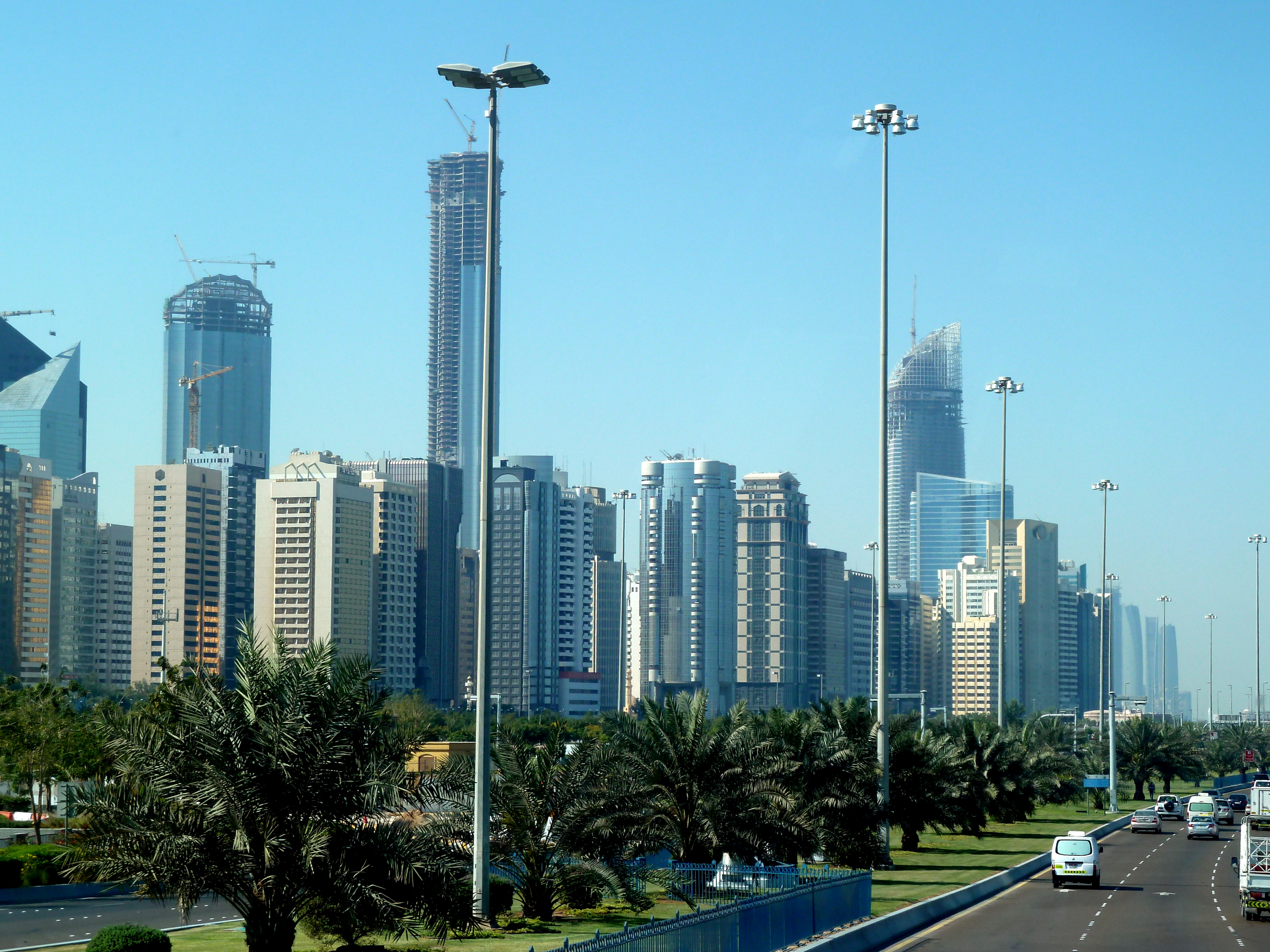
Road in front, skyline in background (Abu Dhabi, Middle East)

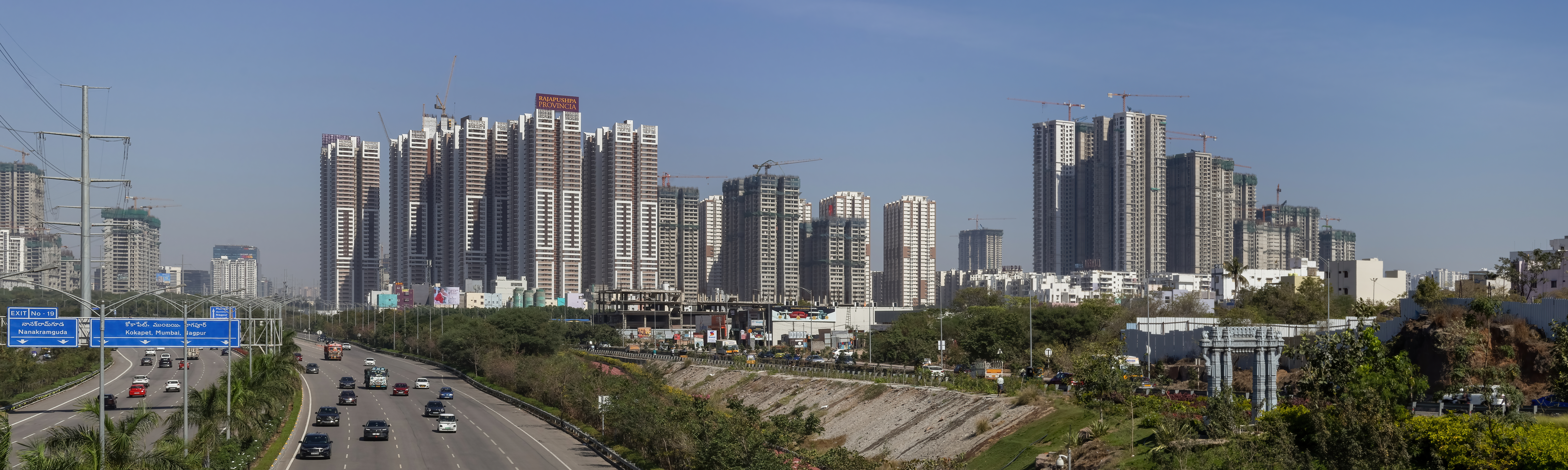
Panoramic view of the skyline in Hyderabad, India, with several high-rise residential buildings

Residential tower complexes are common in Asian countries such as China, India, Bangladesh, Indonesia, Taiwan, Singapore, Japan, Pakistan, Iran and South Korea, as urban densities are very high. In Singapore and urban Hong Kong, land prices are so high that a large portion of the population lives in high-rise apartments. In fact, over 60% of Hong Kong residents live in apartments, many of them condominiums. Of them in 2020, 2,112,138 were identified residents of public housing, which is 28% of the total population.

Sarah Williams Goldhagen (2012) celebrated the work of innovative architecture firms such as WOHA (based in Singapore), Mass Studies (based in Seoul), Amateur Architecture Studio (based in Hangzhou, China), and the New York City-based Steven Holl in the transformation of residential towers into "vertical communities" or "vertical cities in the sky" providing aesthetic, unusually designed silhouettes on the skyline, comfortable private spaces and attractive public spaces. None of these "functional, handsome, and humane high-rise residential buildings" are affordable housing.

==== China ====
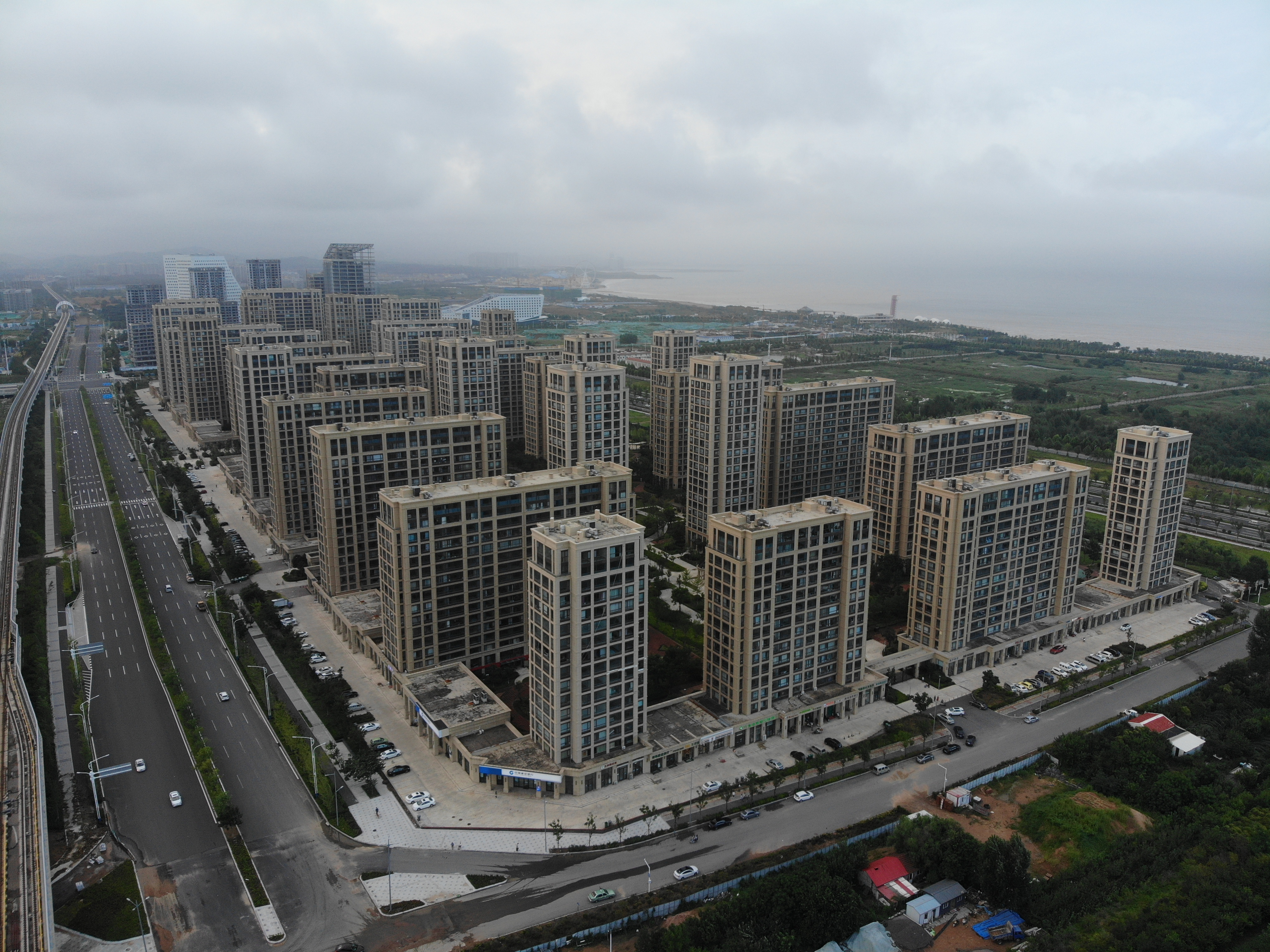
A modern xiaoqu in the city of Qingdao

The 2012 Pritzker Prize was awarded to Chinese architect Wang Shu. Among his winning designs is the Vertical Courtyard Apartments, six 26-story towers by his architectural firm Amateur Architecture Studio built in Hangzhou. "These towers were designed to house two-story apartments, in which every inhabitant would enjoy "the illusion of living on the second floor", accomplished by folding concrete floor planes (like "bamboo mats," claims the firm), so that every third story opens into a private courtyard. In the larger towers, the two-story units are stacked slightly askew, adding to the visual interest of the variegated façades (Goldhagen 2012)."

==== Japan ====
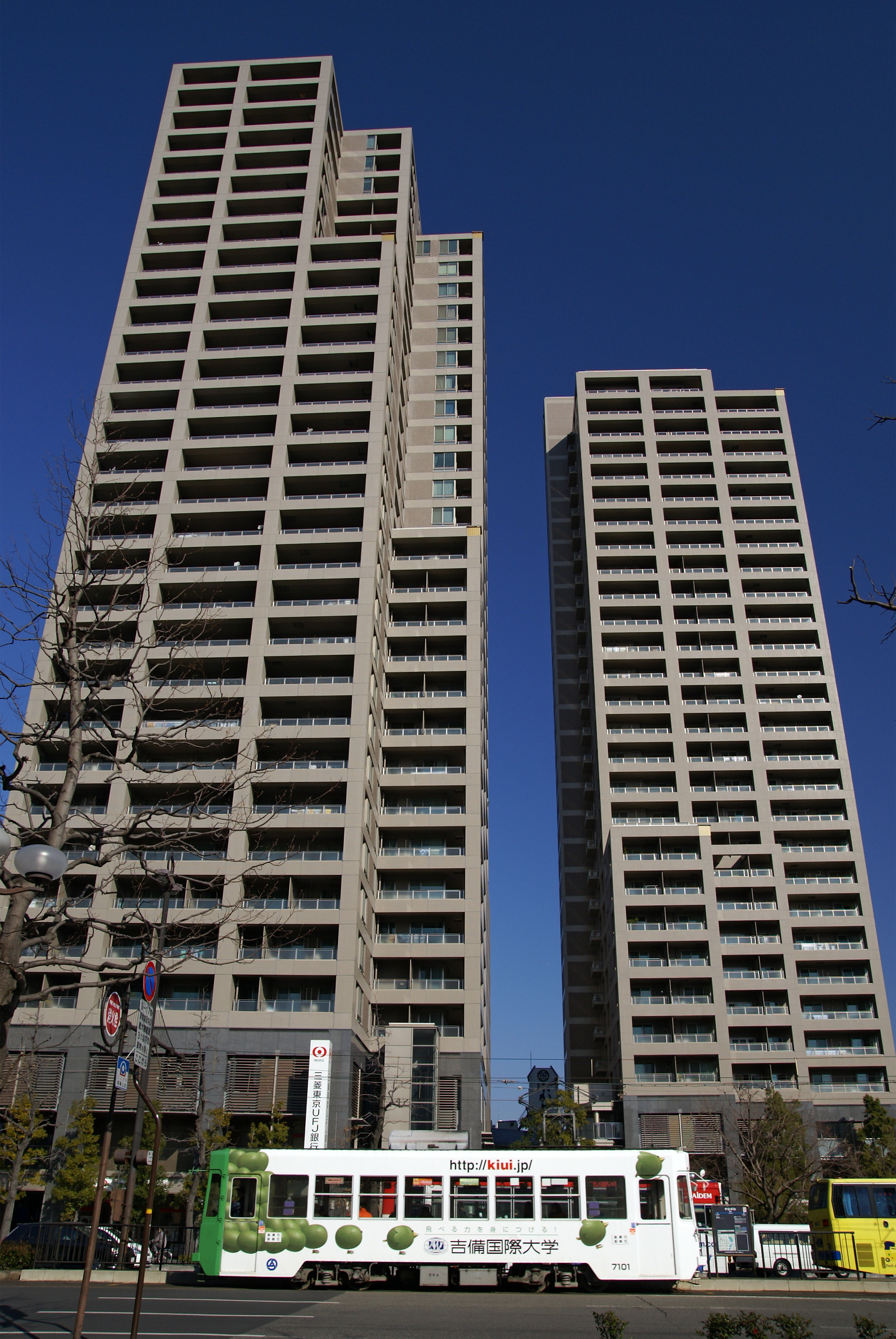
Okayama prefecture "mansions"

Housing in Japan includes various traits coming from different eras. The word danchi now either means an employer-provided housing or has a meaning similar to "projects". For modern hi-rises, there are two borrowed words to make a distinction:

- "Apaato" (アパート）is used to describe a rather small apartment, initially made to be rented;
- a large, modern apartment would be a "mansion" (マンション). The "mansion" nickname is used for both residential towers and for individual condominium apartments (for being roomy, spacey enough to compare to detached houses).

==== South Korea ====
In South Korea, the tower blocks are called Apartment Complex (아파트 단지). The first residential towers began to be built after the Korean War. The South Korean government needed to build many apartment complexes in the cities to be able to accommodate the citizens. In the 60 years since, as the population increased considerably, tower blocks have become more common. This time, however, the new tower blocks integrated shopping malls, parking systems, and other convenient facilities.

Samsung Tower Palace in Seoul, South Korea, is the tallest apartment complex in Asia.

In Seoul, approximately 80 percent of its residents live in apartment complexes which comprise 98 percent of recent residential construction. Seoul proper is noted for its population density, eight times greater than Rome, though less than Manhattan and Paris. Its metropolitan area is the densest in the OECD.

==== India ====
Several metropolitan cities in India have witnessed a surge in vertical development in the 21st-century. Most skyscrapers in cities like Mumbai, Hyderabad, and Delhi-NCR consist of residential units which are commonly referred to as "apartment complexes", "apartment societies", or "gated societies". These residential high-rise buildings are typically located in affluent neighborhoods and include recreational amenities for their residents. The tallest apartment complex in India is the Palais Royale in Mumbai.

Several commercial high-rise buildings also exist and are predominantly used as office spaces, often with multiple organizations sharing the various floors within the high-rise building.

=== Europe ===
==== Central and Eastern Europe ====
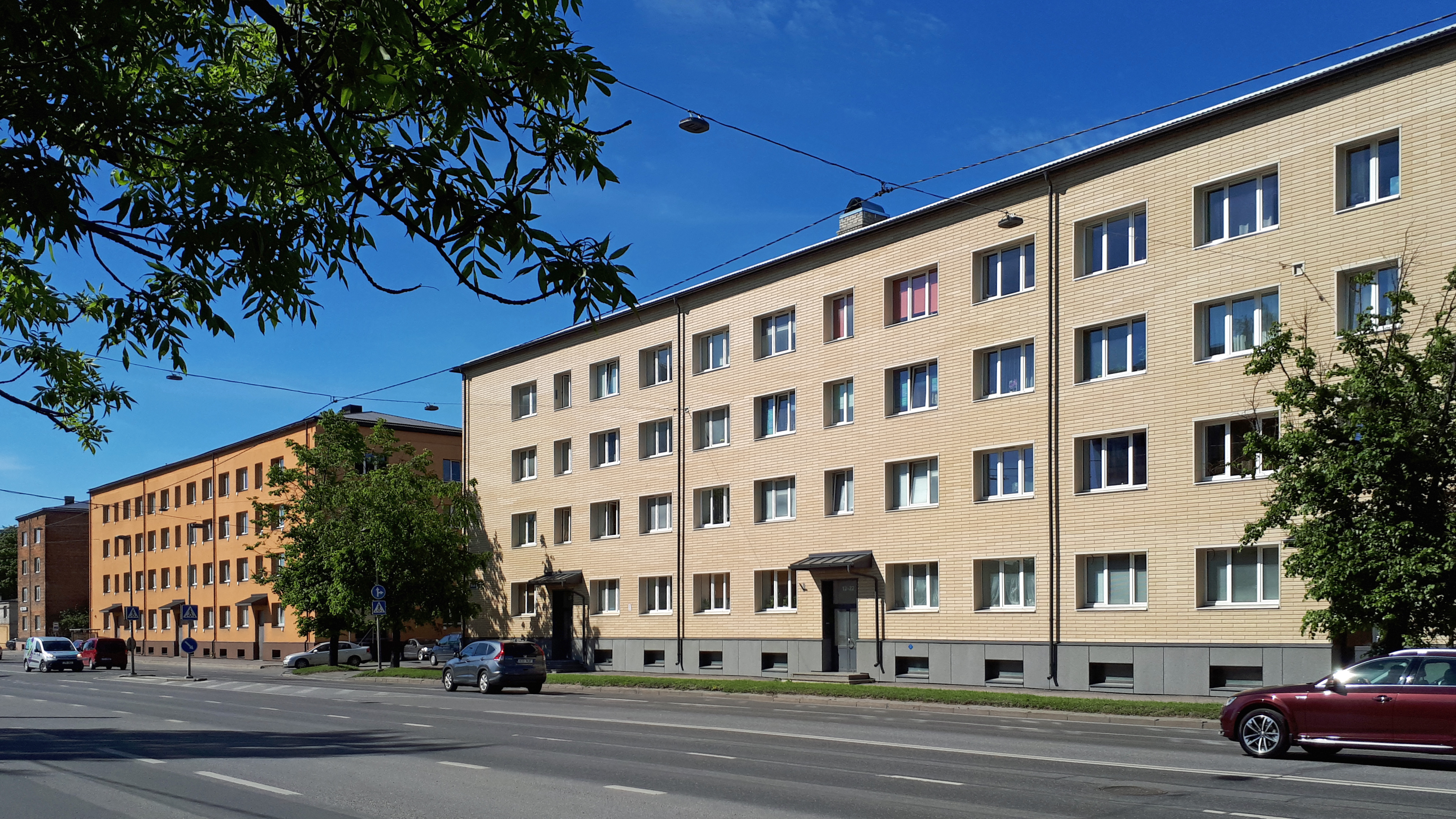
Refurbished 4-story Khrushchyovka, in Tallinn, Estonia

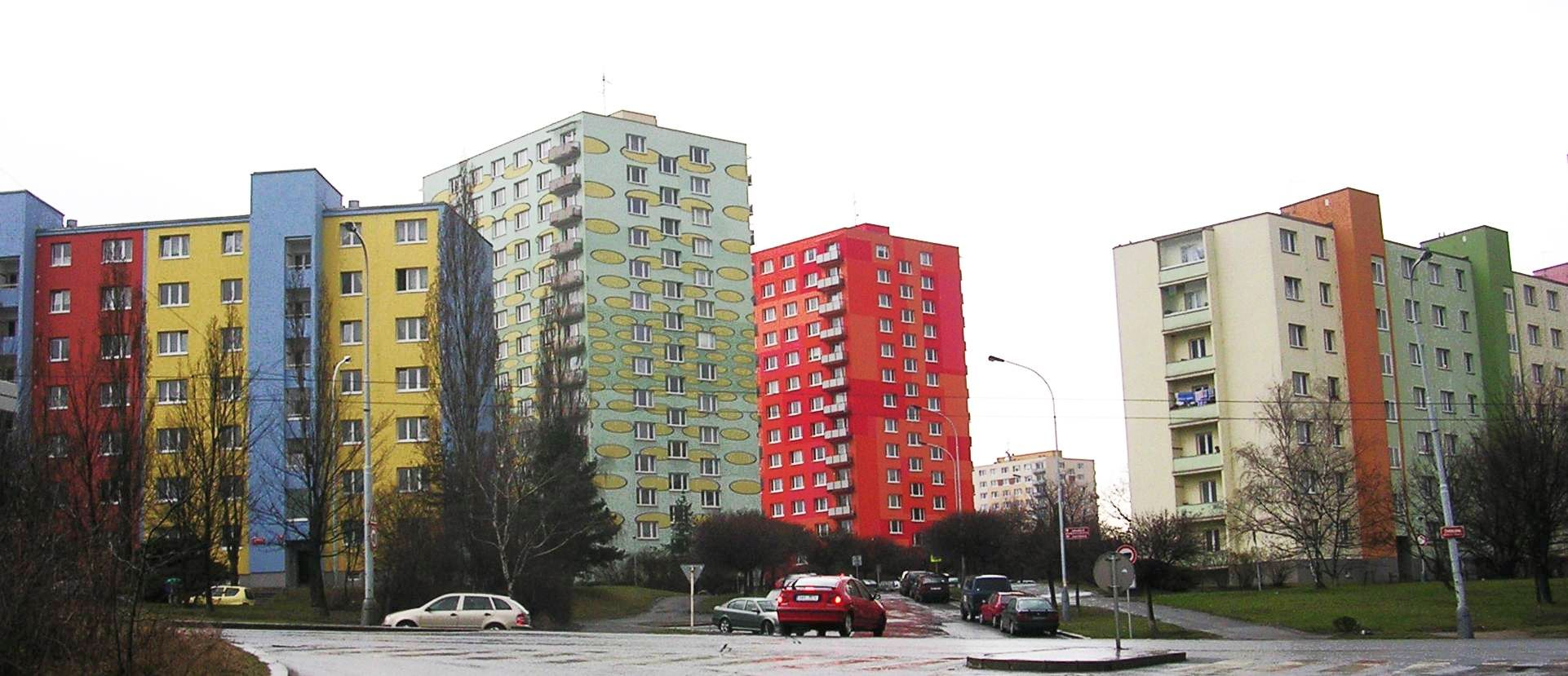
Painted paneláks in Prague, Czech Republic

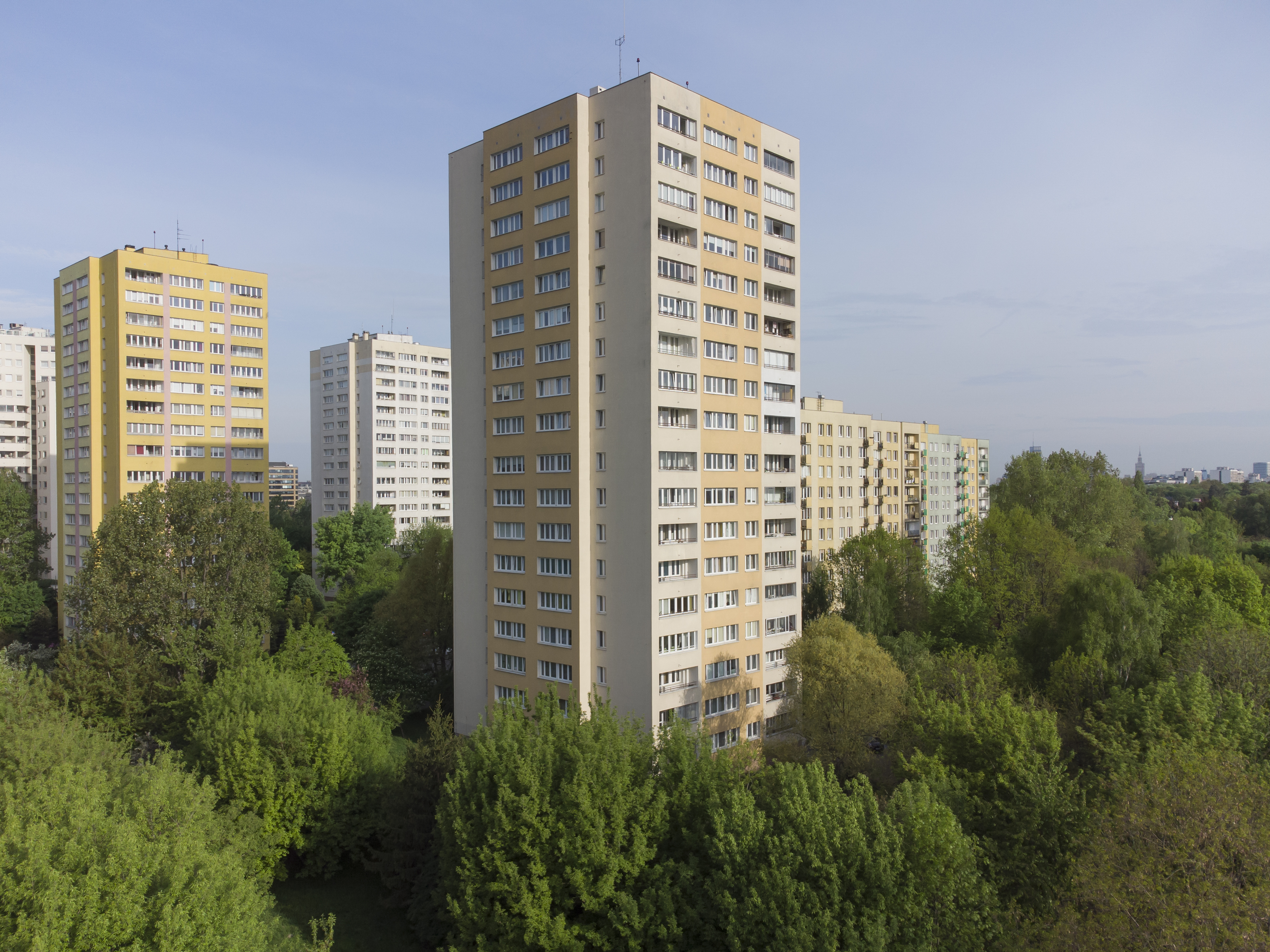
Osiedle Skocznia in Warsaw, Poland

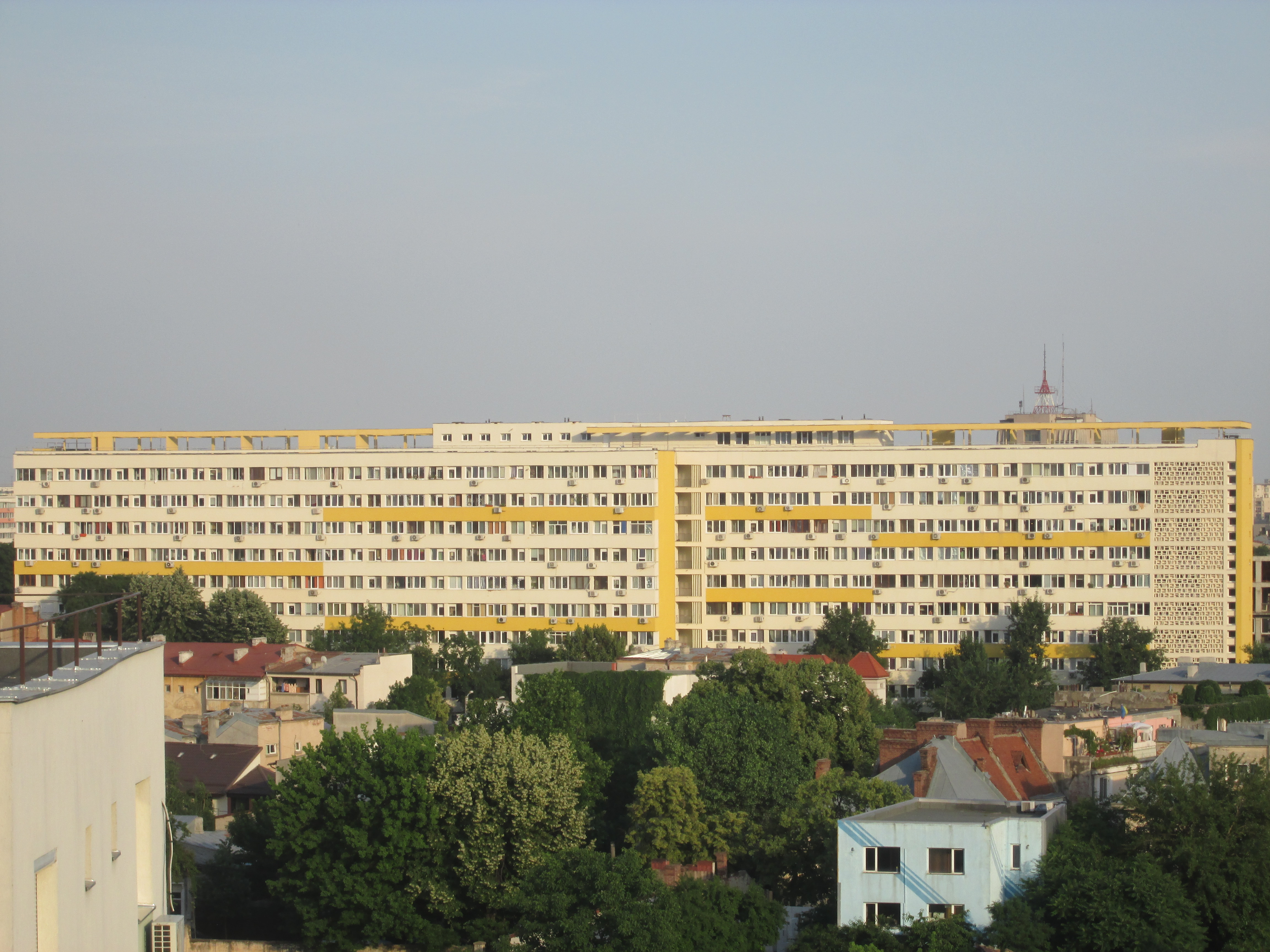
Renovated apartment building from 1963 in Bucharest, Romania. With the 2010s, renovation of older apartment buildings in Eastern Europe has become common, especially in countries which get EU funds.

Although some Central and Eastern European countries during the interwar period, such as the Second Polish Republic, already started building housing estates that were considered to be of a high standard for their time, many of these structures perished during the Second World War.

In the Eastern Bloc, tower blocks were constructed in great numbers to produce plenty of cheap accommodation for the growing postwar populations of the USSR and its satellite states. This took place mostly in the 1950s, 1960s and 1970s, though in the People's Republic of Poland this process started even earlier due to the severe damages that Polish cities sustained during World War II. Throughout the former Eastern Bloc countries, tower blocks built during the Soviet years make up much of the current housing estates and most of them were built in the specific socialist realist style of architecture that was dominant in the territories east of the Iron Curtain: blocky buildings of that era are colloquially known as Khrushchyovka. However, there were also larger and more ambitious projects built in Eastern Europe at the time, which have since become recognisable examples of post-war modernism; such as the largest falowiec building in the Przymorze Wielkie district of Gdańsk, with a length of 860 m (2,821.52 ft) and 1,792 flats, it is the second longest housing block in Europe.

In Romania, the mass construction of standardised housing blocks began in the 1950s and 1960s with the outskirts of the cities, some of which were made up of slums. Construction continued in the 1970s and 1980s, under the systematisation programme of Nicolae Ceaușescu, which consisted largely of the demolition and reconstruction of existing villages, towns, and cities, in whole or in part, in order to build blocks of flats (blocuri), as a result of increasing urbanisation following an accelerated industrialisation process. In Czechoslovakia (now the Czech Republic and Slovakia), panelák building under Marxism–Leninism resulted from two main factors: the postwar housing shortage and the ideology of the ruling party.

In Eastern European countries, opinions about these buildings vary greatly, with some deeming them as eyesores on their city's landscape while others glorify them as relics of a bygone age and historical examples of unique architectural styles (such as socialist realism, brutalism, etc.). Since the dissolution of the Soviet Union, and especially in the late 1990s and early 2000s, many of the former Eastern Bloc countries have begun construction of new, more expensive and modern housing. The Śródmieście borough of Warsaw, the capital of Poland, has seen the development of an array of skyscrapers. Russia is also currently undergoing a dramatic buildout, growing a commercially shaped skyline. Moreover, the ongoing changes made to postwar housing estates since the 2000s in former communist countries vary – ranging from simply applying a new coat of paint to the previously grey exterior to thorough modernisation of entire buildings.

In the European Union, among former Warsaw Pact states, a majority of the population lives in flats in Latvia (65.1%), Estonia (61.3%), Lithuania (58.9%), the Czech Republic (51.0%), Slovakia (46.3%) and Bulgaria (46.2%) (as of 2025, data from Eurostat). However, not all flat dwellers in Eastern Europe live in Cold War-era blocks of flats; many live in buildings constructed after the fall of the Berlin Wall, and some in buildings that survived World War II.

==== Western Europe ====
In Western Europe, there are fewer high-rise buildings because of the historic city centres. In the 1960s, developers began demolishing older buildings to replace them with modern high-rise buildings.In the European Union, among the remaining EU countries, the majority of the population lives in apartments in Malta (65.2%), Spain (64.7%), Greece (59.8%), Germany (58.6%), Italy (57.8%), Portugal (49.6%), Austria (49.2%) and Sweden (48.4%) (as of 2025, Eurostat data). However, not all residents of these countries live in Cold War-era apartment buildings; many live in buildings constructed after the fall of the Berlin Wall, and some in buildings that survived World War II.

===== Belgium =====
In Brussels, there are numerous modern high-rise buildings in the Northern Quarter business district (also called Little Manhattan).

===== France =====
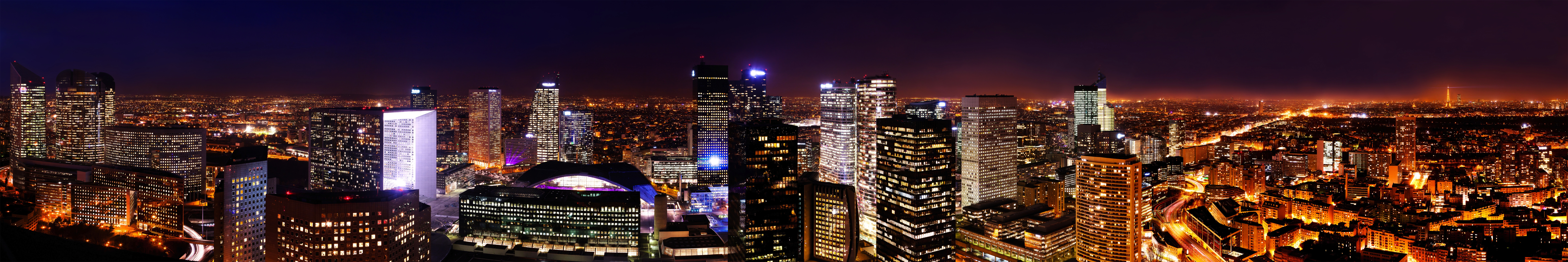
La Défense at night

There are some tall residential buildings in La Défense district, such as Tour Défense 2000, even though the district is mainly "commercial". This allows the residents to walk to the nearby office buildings without using vehicles.

===== Great Britain =====
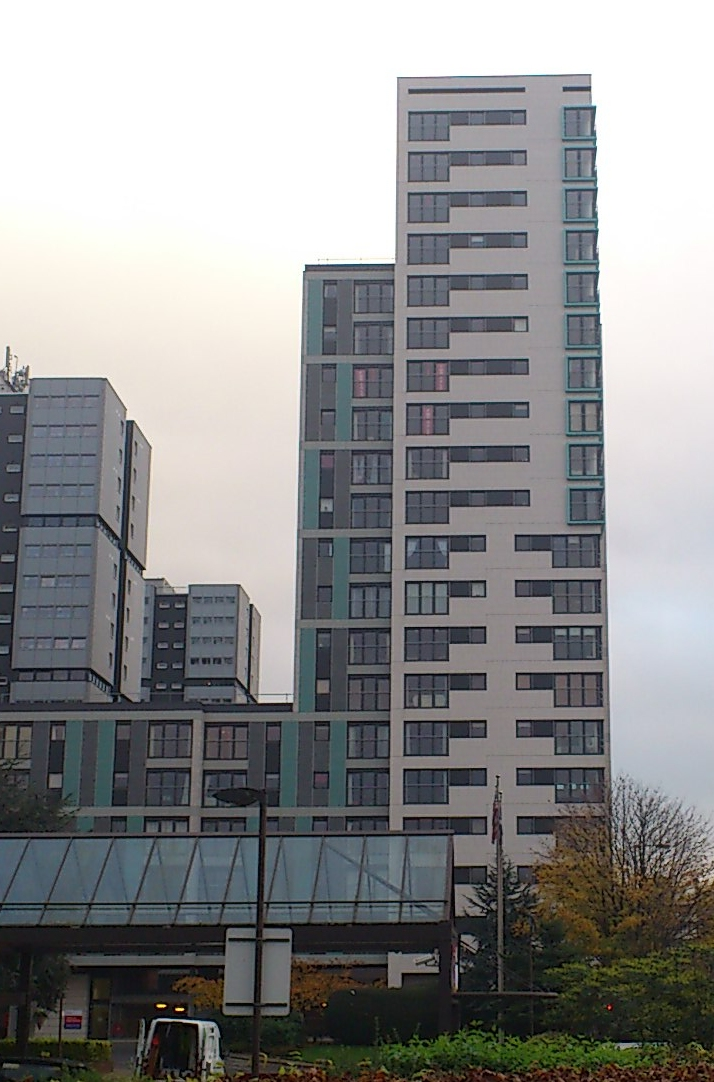
Argyle Building in Glasgow

Tower blocks were first built in the United Kingdom after the Second World War, and were seen as a cheap way to replace 19th-century urban slums and war-damaged buildings. They were originally seen as desirable, but quickly fell out of favour as tower blocks attracted rising crime and social disorder, particularly after the collapse of Ronan Point in 1968.

Although Tower blocks are controversial and numerous examples have been demolished, many still remain in large cities. Due to lack of proper regulation, some tower blocks present a significant fire risk and even though there have been efforts to make them more safe, modern safety precautions can be prohibitively expensive to retrofit. The Grenfell Tower fire in 2017 was partly caused by council ignorance, as a local action group complained to the council about the fire hazards of the tower several years before the incident, yet remedial work had not been carried out. This fire further made tower blocks less desirable to British residents.

There are old high-rise buildings built in the 1960s and 1970s in areas of London such as Tower Hamlets, Newham, Hackney, and virtually any area in London with council housing. Some new high-rises are being built in areas such as Central London, Southwark, and Nine Elms. In east London, some old high-rises are being gentrified, in addition to new high-rises being built in areas such as Stratford and Canary Wharf.

===== Ireland =====
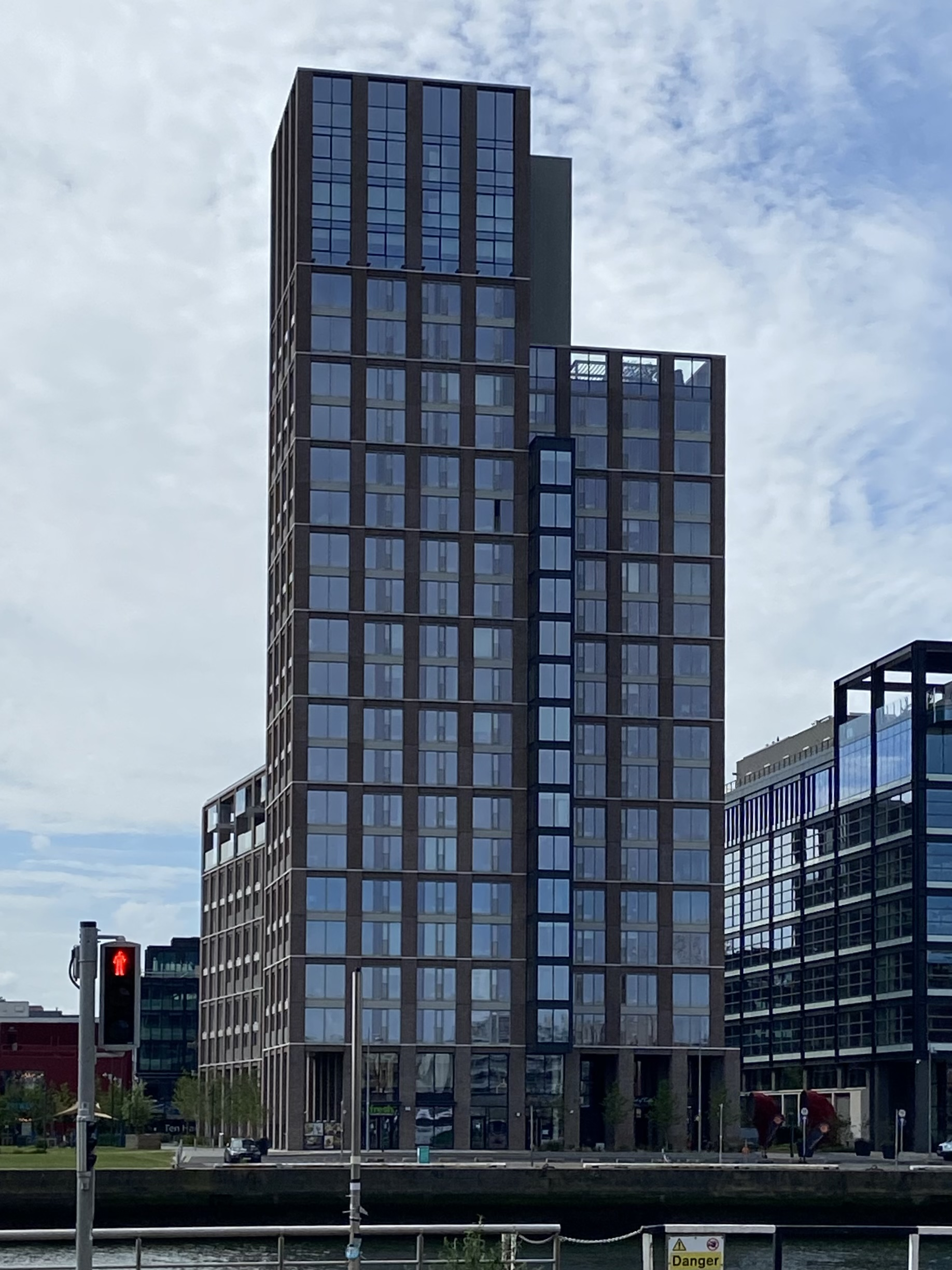
Capital Dock, 22-story "mixed use" building in Dublin, Ireland

====== Republic of Ireland ======
The majority of residential high-rise buildings in the Republic of Ireland were concentrated in the suburb of Ballymun, Dublin. The Ballymun Flats were built between 1966 and 1969: seven 15-story towers, nineteen 8-story blocks and ten 4-story blocks. These were the "seven towers" referred to in the U2 song "Running to Stand Still". They have since been demolished.

Inner Dublin flat complexes, typically of four to five storeys include Sheriff Street (demolished), Fatima Mansions (demolished and redeveloped), St Joseph's Gardens (demolished; replaced by Killarney Court flat complex), St Teresa's Gardens, Dolphin House, Liberty House, St Michael's Estate (eight storeys) and O'Devaney Gardens and a lot more mainly throughout the north and south inner city of Dublin. Suburban flat complexes were built exclusively on the northside of the city in Ballymun, Coolock and Kilbarrack. These flats were badly affected by a heroin epidemic that hit working-class areas of Dublin in the 1980s and early 1990s.

Residential tower blocks were previously uncommon outside of Dublin, but during the era of the Celtic Tiger the largest cities such as Dublin, Cork, Limerick and Galway witnessed new large apartment building, although their heights have generally been restricted. Some large towns such as Navan, Drogheda, Dundalk and Mullingar have also witnessed the construction of many modern apartment blocks.

====== Northern Ireland ======
Tower blocks in Northern Ireland were never built to the frequency as in cities on the island of Great Britain, but taller high-rises are generally more common than in the Republic of Ireland. Most tower blocks and flat complexes are found in Belfast, although many of these have been demolished since the 1990s and replaced with traditional public housing units. The mid-rise Divis flats complex in west Belfast was built between 1968 and 1972. It was demolished in the early 1990s after the residents demanded new houses due to mounting problems with their flats. Divis Tower, built separately in 1966, still stands, however; and in 2007 work began to convert the former British Army base at the top two floors into new dwellings. Divis Tower was for several decades Ireland's tallest residential building, having since being surpassed by the privately owned Obel Tower in the city centre. In the north of the city, the iconic seven-tower complex in the New Lodge remains, although so too the problems that residents face, such as poor piping and limited sanitation. Farther north, the four tower blocks in Rathcoole dominate the local skyline, while in south Belfast, the tower blocks in Seymour Hill, Belvoir and Finaghy remain standing.

Most of the aforementioned high-rise flats in the city were built by the Northern Ireland Housing Trust (NIHT) as part of overspill housing schemes, the first such development being the pair of point blocks in East Belfast's Cregagh estate. These eleven-story towers were completed in 1961 and were the first tall council housing blocks on the island of Ireland. The NIHT also designed the inner city Divis Flats complex. The six-to-eight-storey deck-access flats that comprised most of the Divis estate were of poor build quality and were all demolished by the early 1990s. Similar slab blocks were built by the NIHT in East Belfast (Tullycarnet) and Derry's Bogside area, all four of which have been demolished.

Belfast Corporation constructed seven tower blocks on the former Victoria Barracks site in the New Lodge district. While the Corporation built some mid-rise flats as part of slum clearance schemes (most notably the now demolished Unity Flats and the Weetabix Flats in the Shankill area), New Lodge was its only high-rise project in the inner city; there were three more in outlying areas of the city during the 1960s, two being in Mount Vernon in North Belfast and one being in the Clarawood estate, East Belfast. The Royal Hospital built three thirteen-story towers for use as staff accommodation, prominently located adjacent to the M2 Motorway at Broadway. Belfast City Hospital also constructed a high-rise slab block which since privatisation has been named Bradbury Court, formerly known as Erskine House. Queens University Belfast built several eleven storey towers at its Queens Elms student accommodation. Of the three sixteen-story point blocks of Larne Borough Council in the late 1960s, only one remains.

=== North America ===
==== Canada ====
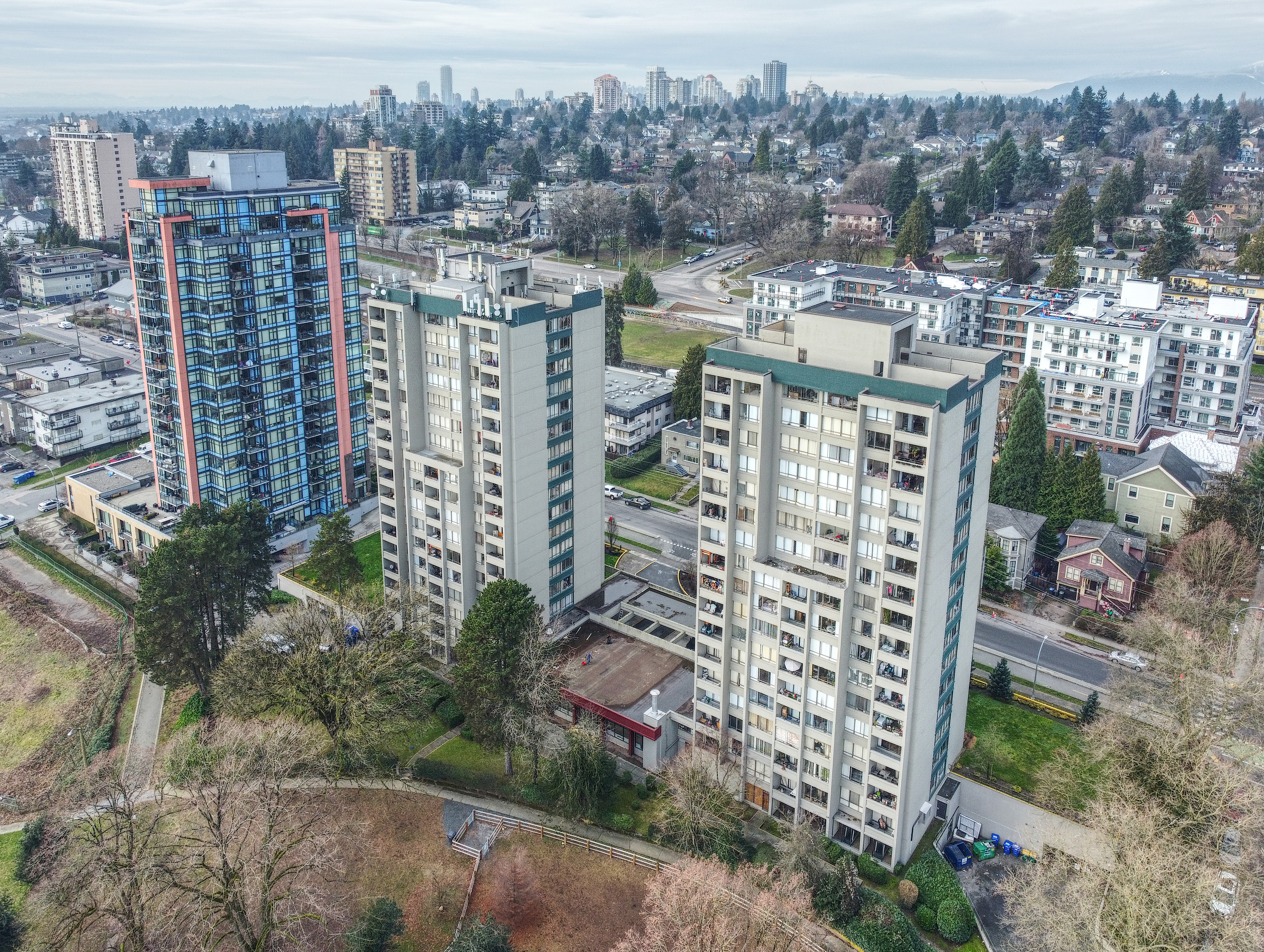
High-rise towers in New Westminster

In Canada, large multi-family buildings are usually known as apartment buildings or apartment blocks if they are rented from one common landowner, or condominiums or condo towers if each dwelling unit is individually owned; they may be called low-rise (or walk-up), mid-rise, high-rise, or skyscraper depending on their height. Tall residential towers are a staple building type in all large cities. Their relative prominence in Canadian cities varies substantially, however. In general, more populated cities have more high-rises than smaller cities, due to a relative scarcity of land and a greater demand for housing.

However, some cities such as Quebec City and Halifax have fewer high-rise buildings due to several factors: a focus on historic preservation, height restrictions, and lower growth rates. In middle-sized cities with a relatively low population density, such as Calgary, Edmonton, Winnipeg, or Hamilton there are more apartment towers but they are greatly outnumbered by single-family houses. Most of the largest residential towers in Canada are found in Montreal, Toronto, and Vancouver; the country's most densely populated cities.

Toronto contains the second largest concentration of high-rise apartment buildings in North America (after New York). In Canada, like in other New World countries, but unlike Western Europe, most high-rise towers are located in the city centre (or "downtown"), where smaller, older buildings were demolished to make way in redevelopment schemes.

==== United States ====
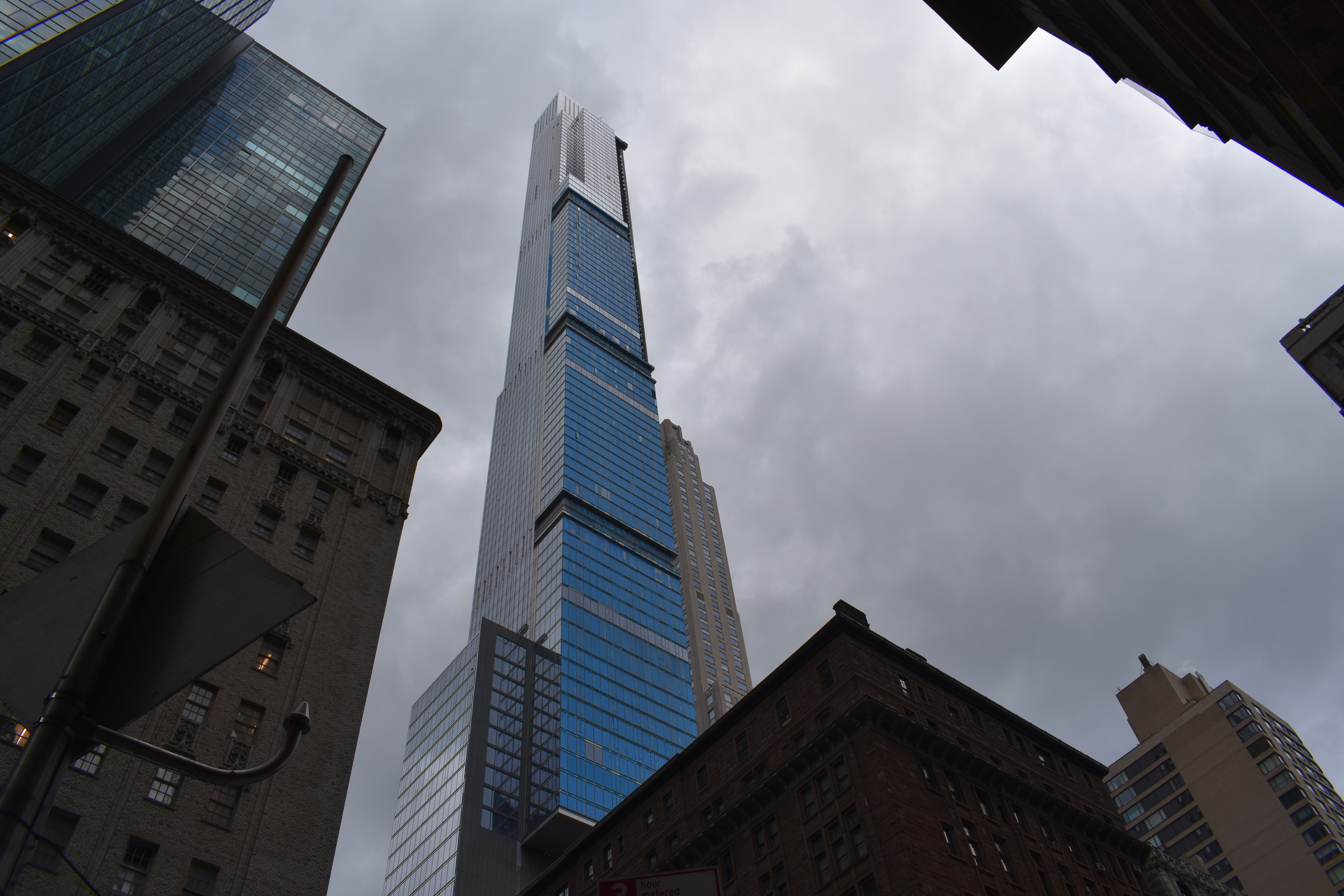
Central Park Tower in Manhattan, New York City, the tallest residential high-rise tower in the world, December 2020

In the United States, tower blocks are commonly referred to as "midrise" or "highrise apartment buildings", depending on their height, while buildings that house fewer flats (apartments), or are not as tall as the tower blocks, are called "lowrise apartment buildings". Specifically, "midrise" buildings are as tall as the streets are wide, allowing five hours of sunlight on the street.

Some of the first residential towers were the Castle Village towers in Manhattan, New York City, completed in 1939. Their cross-shaped design was copied in towers in Parkchester and Stuyvesant Town residential developments.

The government's experiments in the 1960s and 1970s to use high-rise apartments as a means of providing the housing solution for the poor broadly resulted in failure. Made in the tower in the park style, all but a few high-rise housing projects in the nation's largest cities, such as Cabrini–Green and Robert Taylor Homes in Chicago, Penn South in Manhattan, and the Desire Projects in New Orleans, fell victim to the "ghettofication" and are now being torn down, renovated, or replaced. Another example is the former Pruitt–Igoe complex in St. Louis, torn down in the 1970s.

In contrast to their public housing counterparts, commercially developed high-rise apartment buildings continue to flourish in cities around the country largely due to high land prices and the housing boom of the 2000s. The Upper East Side in New York City, featuring high-rise apartments, is the wealthiest urban neighborhood in the United States.

Currently, the tallest residential building in the world is Central Park Tower located in Midtown Manhattan, having a height of 1,550 feet (470 m) with the highest occupied floor at 1,417 feet (432 m).

=== Oceania ===
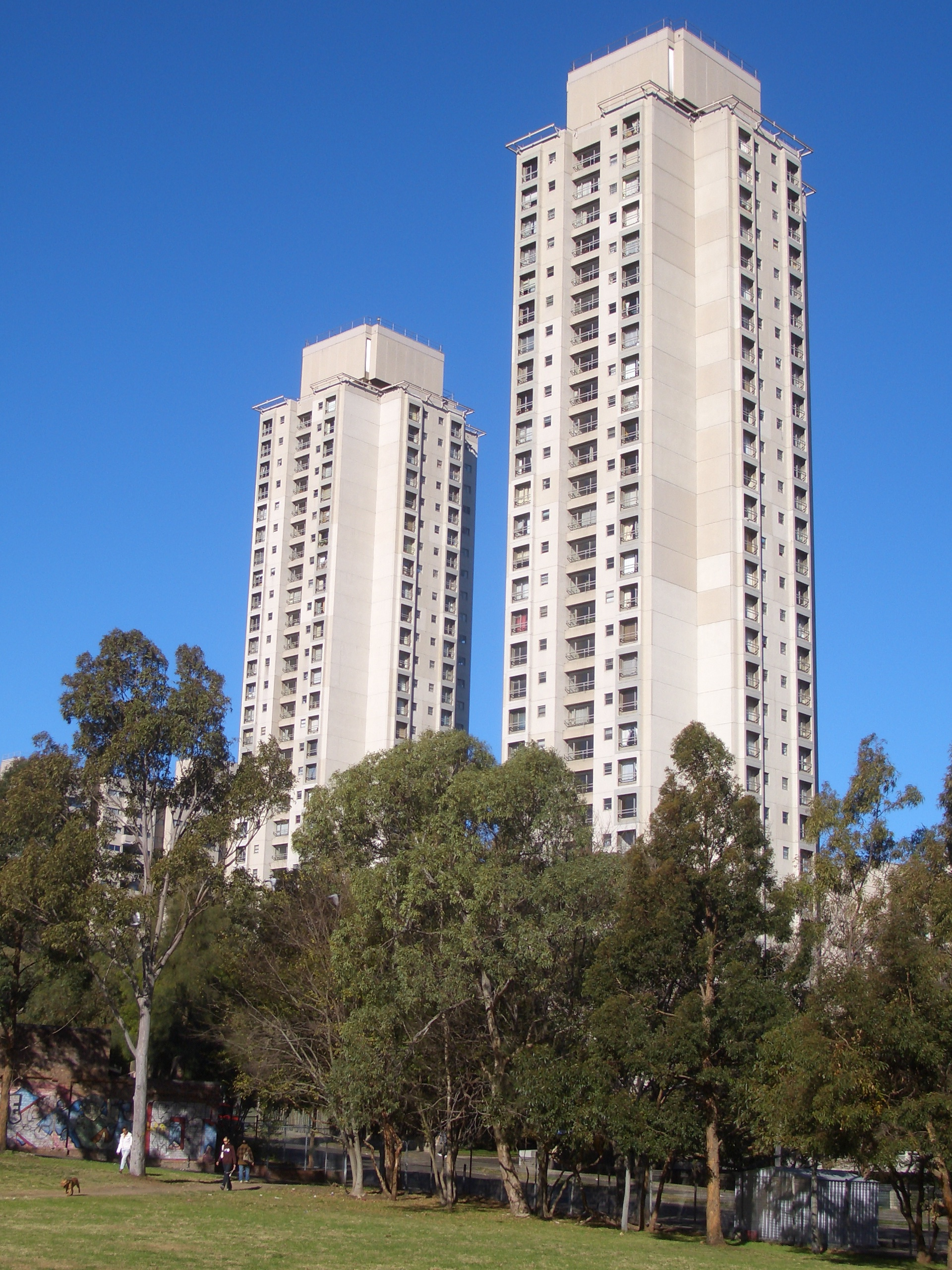
Housing commission towers in Waterloo, Sydney, Australia

High-rise living in Australia was limited to the Sydney CBD until the 1960s, when a short-lived fashion saw public housing tenants located in new high-rise developments, especially in Sydney and Melbourne. The buildings pictured along with four other 16-story blocks were constructed on behalf of the Royal Australian Navy and were available to sailors and their families for accommodation. Due to social problems within these blocks the Navy left and the Department of Housing took charge and flats were let to low income and immigrant families. During the 1980s many people escaping communism in Eastern bloc countries were housed in these buildings. Developers have enthusiastically adopted the term "apartment" for these new high-rise blocks, perhaps to avoid the stigma still attached to housing commission flats.

== Deck access ==
Deck access is a type of flat that is accessed from a walkway that is open to the elements, as opposed to flats that are accessed from fully enclosed internal corridors. Deck-access blocks of flats are usually fairly low-rise structures. The decks can vary from simple walkways, which may be covered or uncovered, to decks wide enough for small vehicles. The best-known example of deck-access flats in the UK is Park Hill, Sheffield, where the decks are wide enough to allow electric vehicles; however, the design is inspired by French Modernist architect Le Corbusier, particularly his Unité d'habitation in Marseille.

== Green tower blocks ==
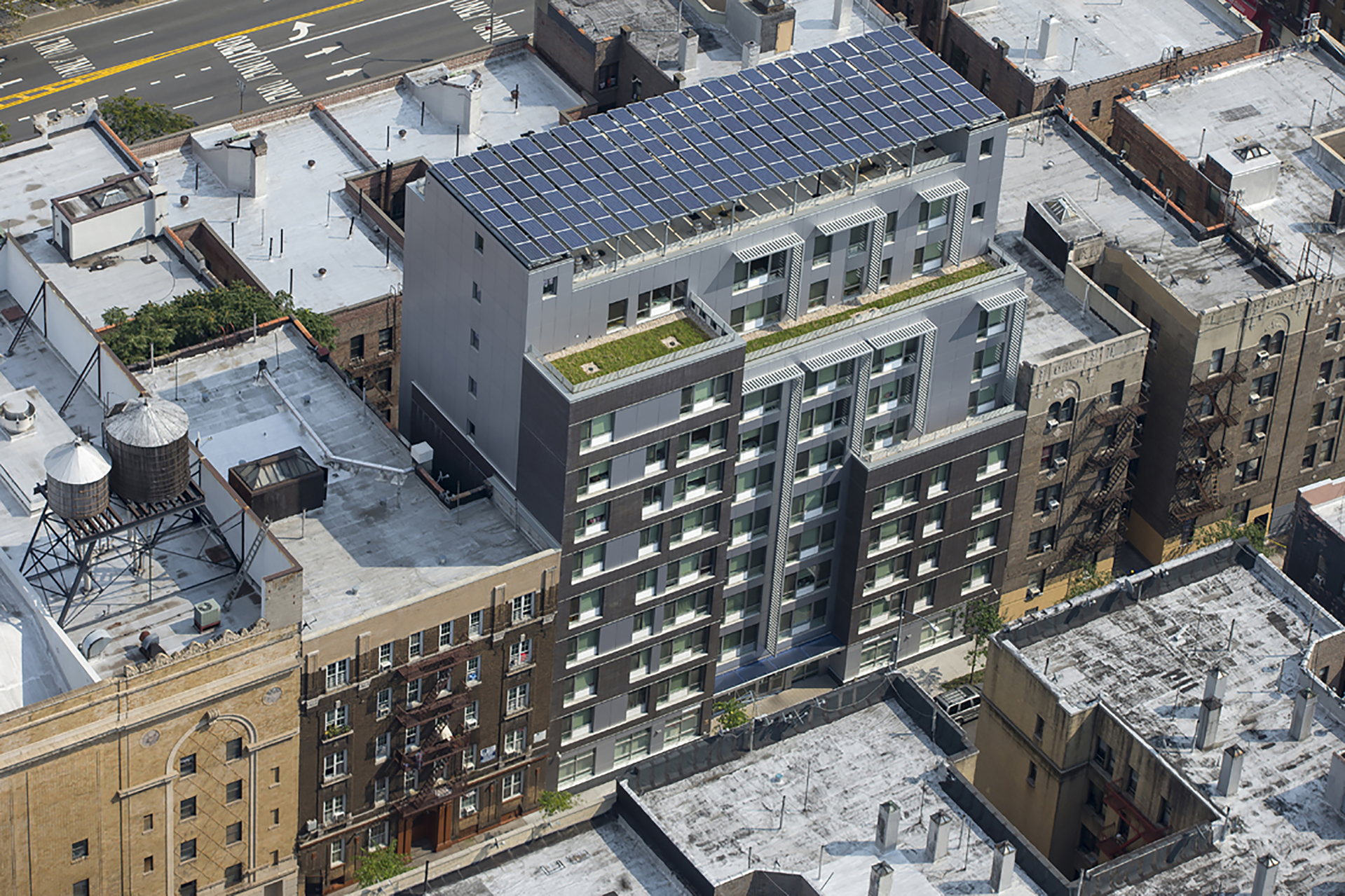
An apartment building with a pergola and solar panels in the Bronx, New York City

Green tower blocks have some scheme of living plants or green roofs or solar panels on their roofs or incorporate other environmentally friendly design features.

== See also ==
- Cutie de chibrituri – meaning Matchboxes in Romanian, are the equivalent in Romania
- Earthquake engineering
- High-rise littering
- Highrise (documentary), a project about life in high-rise apartments around the world
- Large panel system building
- List of fires in high-rise buildings
  - List of high-rise façade fires
    - Grenfell Tower fire
- Prefabrication
- Wind engineering
