= Ellen Beck =

Ellen Beck may refer to:

- Ellen Beck (poet) (1858–1924), Irish poet and writer
- Ellen Beck (soprano) (1873–1953), Danish mezzo-soprano
