= Baile na Carraige =

Baile na Carraige is an Irish name for two villages:

- Rock, County Tyrone, Northern Ireland
- Ballynacargy, County Westmeath, Ireland
