= Clanvaraghan =

Village in County Down, Northern Ireland

Coordinates: 54.301933°N 5.9280003°W

Clanvaraghan: Irish: Cluain Bhearcháin; Clanvaraghan
- Location within County Down
- Population: 186 (2001 Census)
- District: Newry, Mourne and Down
- County: County Down
- Country: Northern Ireland
- Sovereign state: United Kingdom
- Postcode district: BT31
- Dialling code: 028
- UK Parliament: South Down
- NI Assembly: South Down

Clanvaraghan is a small village in County Down, in the north-east of Northern Ireland close to the Irish Sea. Clanvaraghan is located approximately 3 miles north of the town of Castlewellan. The village has a population of 186 residents while the number of people living within this rural townland is much greater.

== Places of interest ==
Slieve Croob (from Irish Sliabh Crúibe 'mountain of the hoof') is a mountain with a height of 534 metres (1,752 ft) in the middle of County Down, Northern Ireland. It is the heart of a mountainous area known as the Dromara Hills, north of the Mourne Mountains. It is designated an Area of Outstanding Natural Beauty and is the source of the River Lagan. There is a small road to the summit, where there is an ancient burial cairn and several transmitter stations with radio masts. It has wide views over all of County Down and further afield. The Dromara Hills also includes Slievenisky, Cratlieve, Slievegarran and Slievenaboley.

Slieve Croob may have been the mountain named Brí Erigi or Brí Airige in medieval writings. The cairn on its summit is believed to be the remains of an ancient burial mound, possibly of a passage tomb like the one on Slieve Gullion. In the 19th century it was recorded to be 77 yards (70 m) around and 18 yards (16 m) in "conical height", with forty-two "pillar stones" or kerbstones around the edge. The cairn would have had a well-defined shape when it was built, but over time it has slipped and been damaged by visitors. Irish folklore holds that it is bad luck to damage such cairns. Some of its stones have been piled into smaller cairns on top of it, which led to the summit being nicknamed 'The Twelve Cairns'. Traditionally, people would gather on the summit at Lughnasadh where they would add a stone to one of the cairns. They would collect and eat bilberries and there would be folk music, dancing and games.

St. Mary of the Angels is a Roman Catholic church prominently located within the village of Clanvaraghan. Construction of the Church lasted from 1936 to 1937, with the official consecration being carried out by Bishop Mageen on 26 September 1937. This was not the first church located in Clanvaraghan with a previous T-shape building being located in what is now the old graveyard. This older church was constructed in 1825 and succeeded another structure also on this same sight which was built in 1785.
