= The Troubles in Rock, County Tyrone =

Incidents in Rock, Northern Ireland during the Troubles

The Troubles in Rock recounts incidents during, and the effects of, The Troubles in Rock, County Tyrone, Northern Ireland.

Incidents in Rock during the Troubles resulting in two or more fatalities:

== 1975 ==
- 10 February 1975 - Arthur Mulholland (65) and Eugene Doyle (18), both Catholic civilians, were shot dead at Hayden's Bar, Rock, during an Ulster Volunteer Force gun attack which was later linked to the "Glenanne gang".

== Links ==
- NI Conflict Archive on the Internet
