= Douglas Bridge =

Village in County Tyrone, Northern Ireland

Coordinates: 54°45′24″N 07°25′17″W

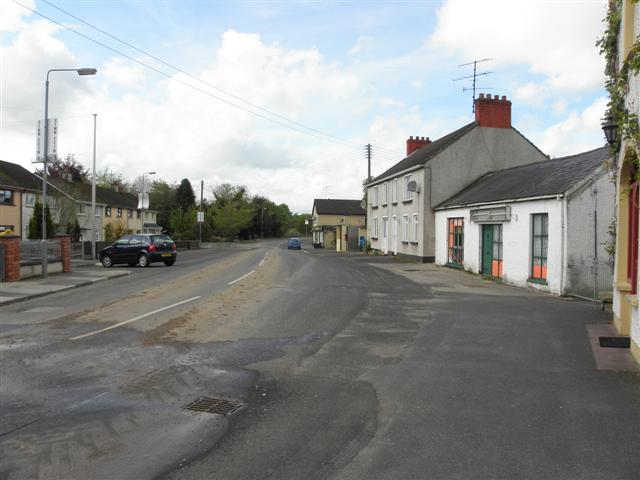
Road through Douglas Bridge

Douglas Bridge is a small village near Strabane in County Tyrone, Northern Ireland. In the 2021 Census it had a population of 141. It lies within the Derry City and Strabane area.

The name comes from Irish dúglas 'black stream' and the English bridge. The settlement straddles the boundaries of the townlands of Drumnahoe, Skinboy, and Knockroe. The modern Irish name is Droichead na Dúghlaise.

== People ==
The poem "Ballad of Douglas Bridge" by Francis Carlin appears in Anthology of Irish Verse, 1922, by Padraic Colum.
