= Ellen Beck (poet) =

Irish poet and writer (1858–1924)

- Born: 1858; Rock, County Tyrone
- Died: 1924 (aged 65–66); Rock, County Tyrone
- Other name: Magdalen Rock

Ellen Beck (1858–1924), was an Irish poet and writer. She wrote extensively for a variety of periodicals such as Chambers's Journal and the Irish Monthly under the pen name of Magdalen Rock. Her work was published in a variety of venues worldwide. She also wrote two books. A sandstone statue was erected in Beck's memory in Rock in 2015.

== Biography ==
Ellen Beck was born in the village of Rock, County Tyrone in 1858. She spent her life there as a teacher in the local school, beginning aged just sixteen. Beck wrote extensively for a variety of periodicals such as Chambers's Journal and the Irish Monthly under the pen name of Magdalen Rock, with her first poem published in 1890 in Irish Monthly, when she was 32 years old. She wrote more than ninety poems for the Irish Monthly. Beck published in the Catholic press initially, but in 1891 submitted her work to Chamber's. This journal was widely syndicated in American and Australian newspapers including New York Times and the Melbourne Advocate.

Beck also wrote the words for an operetta to music arranged by Joseph Seymour, which was published by Curwen and Sons in London in 1895. The operetta, An Irish May Day. A Children's Operetta or Cantata on Irish Airs was favourably reviewed in the Irish Monthly: "The libretto is far above the average of such work; pleasant and tuneful lyrics weaving together a little story, all suited to the youthful singers for whom the work is intended". Beck published two books but had hundreds of poems and short stories published worldwide. However Beck herself claimed to have only left Rock twice in her life.

In 2015, a statue was unveiled in Rock, depicting a woman carrying two buckets of water steadied by a hoop. The life-size sandstone statue is both a tribute to generations of water-carrying village women, but also a memorial to Beck, who wrote about fetching ‘a Go of Water’ (a 'go' being a local term for two buckets) in her story ‘Day in the Life of an Ulster Village’.

== Works ==
- The Mystery of Geoffrey Melcombe's Death (1895)
- Nellie's Lover and Other Stories (1896)
