= Rock, County Tyrone =

Coordinates: 54.592°N 6.835°W

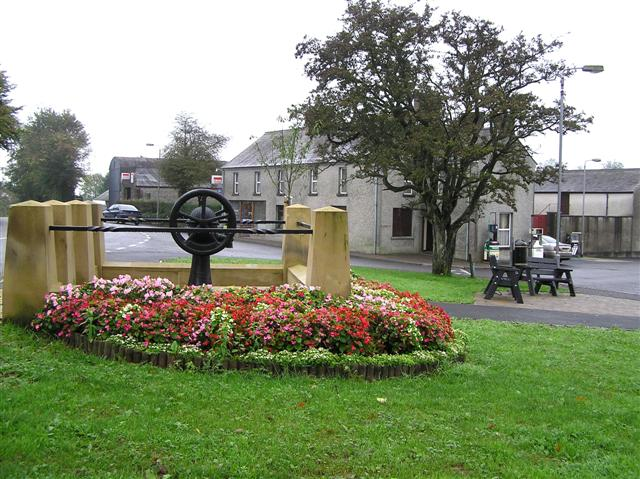
Disused water pump in The Rock.

Rock (from Irish Carraig) is a small village in east County Tyrone, Northern Ireland located approximately 5 miles south-west of Cookstown. The village and surrounding area is located mainly within the parish of Desertcreat.

== Sport ==
Rock St. Patrick's GAC is the local Gaelic Athletic Association club.

The club has won the Ulster Junior Club Football Championship on three occasions (2007, 2014 and 2016).

== Education ==
- Sacred Heart Primary School

== History ==
The village name was recorded originally as Baile na Carraige. A stone quarry later operated in the late 19th and early 20th centuries. A Mass rock exists in Tullyodonnell, half a mile from the village.

== Notable people ==
- Ellen Beck (1858–1924), Irish poet and writer

== See also ==
- List of villages in Northern Ireland
- List of towns in Northern Ireland
- The Troubles in Rock, County Tyrone
