= Clarawood =

Housing estate in Belfast, Northern Ireland

Coordinates: 54.587°N 5.868°W

Clarawood: Irish: An Chlárach
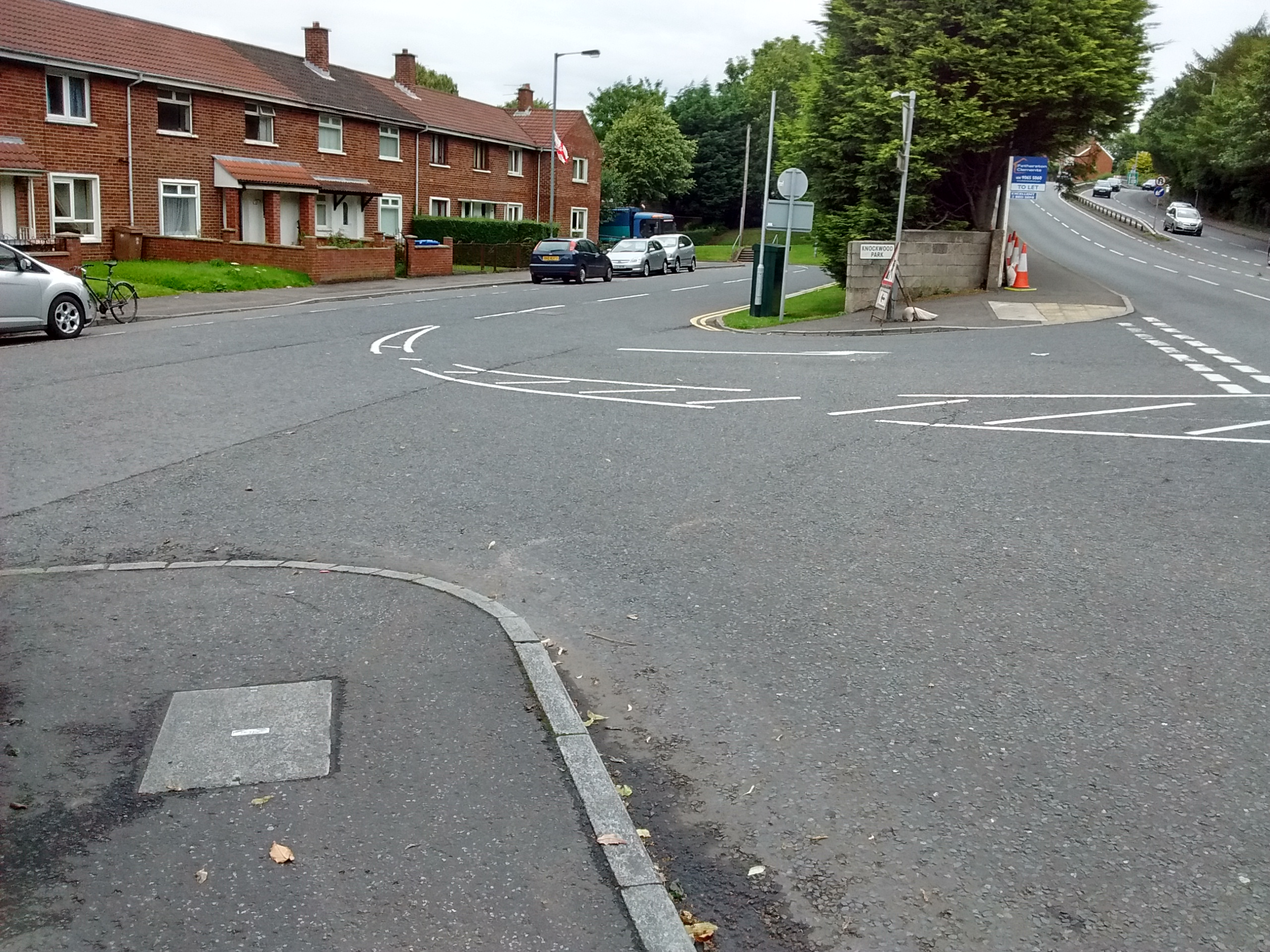
- Entrance to Clarawood from Knock Carriageway

- Location within County Down
- County: County Down
- Country: Northern Ireland
- Sovereign state: United Kingdom
- Post town: Belfast
- Postcode district: BT5
- Dialling code: 028
- Police: Northern Ireland
- Fire: Northern Ireland
- Ambulance: Northern Ireland
- UK Parliament: East Belfast
- NI Assembly: East Belfast

Clarawood is a housing estate in Belfast, Northern Ireland. It is located in the east of the city and incorporates the neighbouring Richhill development. Its name is probably derived from An Chlárach (Irish: the place of flat-topped hills). It is located off Knock Road (A55).

== Population ==
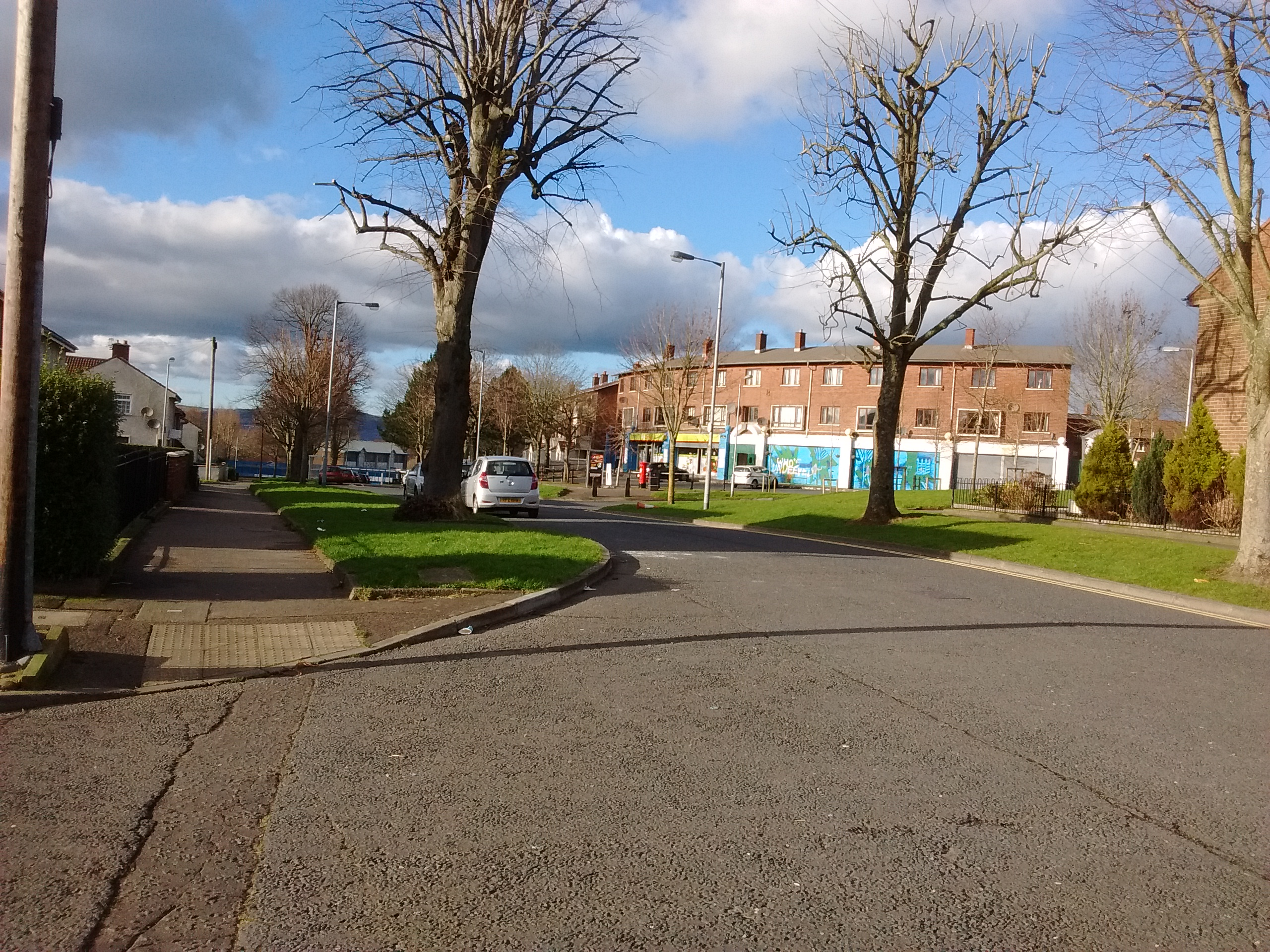
Central part of the estate showing the shops

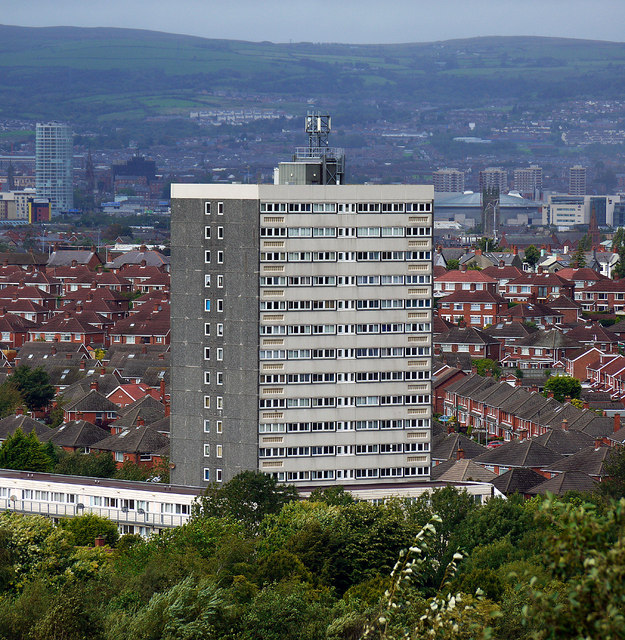
Clarawood House flats

The Northern Ireland Housing Executive, the public housing authority for Northern Ireland, commissioned and published a report about segregation in the estates; the report was based on national census data gathered between 1971 and 2001 and used 100m cells as the smallest unit. The report included the following figures for Clarawood:

- In 1971, 2% Catholic, 94% Protestant, and 3% unknown;
- In 1991, 1% Catholic, 83% Protestant, and 17% of which claimed no or another religion;
- In 2001, 2% Catholic, 93% Protestant, and 5% claimed no religion.

== Facilities ==
As of 2015, the Housing Executive reported on it stock of housing units; it reported that Clarawood contained 591 residences (bungalows, maisonettes, flats, and houses), 313 of which were owned by the Housing Executive and 278 of which had been sold.

Robert Bell Primary School was built to serve about 180 students; as of 1984 it was slated to be closed.

Part of the closed school's facilities were made into a school for children with special needs, the Clarawood School, and part was made into a community centre called the Anne Napier Centre.

As of 2013 the Clarawood School provided education for children with social, emotional and behavioural difficulties; it provided full-time education for 19 children, part-time education for 14 children, and educational support 137 pupils via an outreach program.

The Anne Napier Centre apparently closed around 2004; in 2009 the Clarawood Community Association, which had been formed in 2003 to organize and advocate for the residents of the neighborhood, the Belfast City Council, and the Belfast Education and Library Board came to an agreement to allow the community association to lease the facility for use as a community centre.

The Oak Partnership was formed by several churches and the YMCA in 1999 and in 2002 it opened its Oak Centre in 2 former shops. The Oak Partnership was one of the twenty winners from around Ireland in Cooperation Ireland's Pride of Place awards for 2014.

== Environment ==
Clarawood has its own park called Clarawood Millennium Park that was improved in the late 1990s under a program called "Belfast 2000: A city with a landscape (Northern Ireland)" that was run by the city government in conjunction with the Millennium Commission; the program developed 6 parks, 3 in West Belfast and three in the east, all in areas "which suffered through the Troubles and four of the six are in areas with high levels of deprivation." Clarawood also has its own wood. Many of the estate's trees are protected by a Local Landscape Policy Order.

Flooding periodically affected the bottom of the estate along with much of East Belfast; floods were particularly severe in 2012. As a result, the Rivers Agency the city government created a flood alleviation scheme. Part of that scheme included creation of the Connswater Community Greenway Project, which included rerouting the Knock River and the creation of parkland connecting Orangefield Park to Clarawood.

== Transport ==
The estate is served by Translink Metro bus route number 4e Gilnahirk via Bloomfield & Clarawood and an Easibus service to Connswater.

== Notable residents ==
Jim Gray (UDA member), a Northern Irish loyalist and the East Belfast brigadier of the Ulster Defence Association (UDA), was murdered at his father's home in Clarawood in 2005.
