= List of places in County Tyrone =

This is a list of cities, towns, villages and hamlets in County Tyrone, Northern Ireland. See the list of places in Northern Ireland for places in other counties.

Towns are listed in bold.

== A ==
- Aghyaran
- Altamuskin
- Altishane
- Altmore
- Ardboe
- Ardstraw
- Artigarvan
- Augher
- Aughnacloy

== B ==
- Ballygawley
- Ballinderry
- Ballymagorry
- Ballymully Glebe
- Benburb
- Beragh
- Blackwatertown
- Brackaville
- Bready
- Brockagh

== C ==
- Caledon
- Cappagh
- Carnteel
- Carrickmore
- Castlecaulfield
- **Castlederg**
- Clabby
- Clady
- Clanabogan
- Clogher
- Coagh
- **Coalisland**
- **Cookstown**
- Cranagh
- Creggan

== D ==
- Derrychrin
- Derryloughan
- Derrytresk
- Donaghmore
- Donemana
- Dooish
- Douglas Bridge
- Dromore
- Drumkee
- Drumnakilly
- Drumquin
- **Dungannon**
- Dunnamore

== E ==
- Edenderry
- Edendork
- Eglish
- Erganagh
- Eskra
- Evish

== F ==
- Fintona
- Fivemiletown

== G ==
- Galbally
- Garvaghey
- Garvetagh
- Gillygooly
- Glebe
- Glenmornan
- Gortaclare
- Gortin
- Granville
- Greencastle

== K ==
- Kildress
- Killay
- Killen
- Killeter
- Killyclogher
- Killyman
- Kilskeery
- Knockmoyle

== L ==
- Landahaussy
- Liscloon
- Loughmacrory

== M ==
- Magheramason
- Moortown
- Mountfield
- Mountjoy
- Moy
- Moygashel
- Moylagh
- Mullaghmore

== N ==
- Newmills
- Newtownstewart

== O ==
- **Omagh** (county town)

== P ==
- Plumbridge
- Pomeroy

== R ==
- Rock
- Rousky

== S ==
- Sandholes
- Seskinore
- Shanmaghery
- Sion Mills
- Sixmilecross
- Spamount
- Stewartstown
- **Strabane**
- Strathroy

== T ==
- Tamnamore
- Tattyreagh
- Trillick
- Tullyhogue
- Tullywiggan

== V ==
- Victoria Bridge

== W ==
- Washing Bay

== See also ==
- List of civil parishes of County Tyrone
- List of townlands in County Tyrone
