= St John's Business and Enterprise College =

Coordinates: 54.515°N 7.453°W

St. John's College

Location
- 37 Omagh Road; Dromore, County Tyrone, BT78 3AL; Northern Ireland

Information
- Type: Secondary School
- Motto: "Love One Another"
- Religious affiliation: Roman Catholic
- Established: 1965
- Local authority: Education Authority (Western)
- Specialist: Business & Enterprise College
- Principal: Christine Doherty
- Gender: Co-educational
- Age: 11 to 16
- Enrolment: 140
- Publication: Hilltop News
- Website: http://www.stjohnsdromore.com/

St. John's Business and Enterprise College (also known as St. John's, Dromore, or by its old title St. John's High School) is a Roman Catholic secondary school for boys and girls based in the village of Dromore, County Tyrone, Northern Ireland. It is in the Western Education and Library Board area.

As of September 2012, the school has an enrolment of 140 pupils.

== History ==
The school opened as St. John's High School in September 1965 as a co-educational school for boys and girls aged 11 to 15 years old, which increased to 16 with the raising of the compulsory schooling age in 1973. The school was bombed by the UVF on 18 March 1973, causing extensive damage. Rebuilding was completed by September 1975.

In 2006, St. John's High School became St. John's Business and Enterprise College after having obtained specialist school status from the Department of Education The school was one of the first twelve in Northern Ireland to be designated with a specialist status, and the first specialising in Business & Enterprise.

== Site ==
St. John's is situated on the top of a hill in Dromore just off the main A5 Omagh to Enniskillen road that goes through the village, with the local St. Davog's Catholic Church lying just across the road. Dromore village can be looked down upon from the front entrance of the school.

The school building was originally built as one complete unit prior to opening in the 1960s. In the 1990s two new blocks were completed, a technology-and-design block was opened in October 1994 and a science block, separate from the main building, was opened in September 1997. A new sports complex, the Dromore Sports Complex which is separate from the main building consisting of an indoor sports hall, a gym, meeting room and changing facilities was officially opened in January 2008. The Dromore Sports Complex serves a dual purpose, during school hours the facility is used by the college and localPrimary Schools in Dromore for timetabled Physical Education activities. Outside of these hours the complex facilities is open to members of the public and local groups.

== Catchment area ==
St. John's initially served the Catholic parishes of Dromore and Kilskeery, which included the villages of Dromore, Trillick and Kilskeery, and later in the early 1970s added the parish of Donacavey and the village of Fintona to its catchment area. This area, all of which is rural, lies in the west of County Tyrone, south and west of Omagh, bordering County Fermanagh.

This remains the core catchment area of the school today however past and present pupils have come from other local villages and towns in both Tyrone and Fermanagh including Omagh, Irvinestown, Drumquin, Killyclogher, Seskinore, Beragh, Castlederg, Ederney and Tempo.

== Education ==
St. John's teaches children aged between 11 and 16 (Year 8 to Year 12) and covers subject areas in Key Stages 3 and 4. Subjects taught include English, Mathematics, Science, History, Geography, Business Studies, French, Religious Studies, Music, Drama, Art, Technology and Design, Information Communication Technology, Home Economics, Physical Education, Motor Vehicle Studies and Careers.

Students in Years 11 and 12 follow courses in subject areas that lead towards GCSE qualifications. After these exams, where the final papers are taken at the end of the school year in May and June and students receive their results in August, students leave the school. The vast majority will continue their education by studying for a Post-16 qualification normally at a school or college in Omagh or Enniskillen. This normally includes A-Levels, Vocational A-Levels, National Diploma or NVQ which may involve work placement. Other students either get accepted into a local Apprenticeship or enter straight into the workforce.

In Summer 2007, 80% of Year 12 students received 5 or more GCSEs where grades between A* and C were obtained.

The school has for a number of years run a "School to Work" programme for students in Years 11 and 12. This is offered to students in Year 10, as part of choosing their optional subjects for GCSE study, and is subject to interview involving themselves and their parents or guardians. Students that follow this programme spend one day a week with a local employer which is monitored by South West College in Omagh.

== Principals ==
The current principal is Miss Christine Doherty, a long-time Mathematics and ICT teacher at the school who succeeded Mr Adrian Taggart in 2007, having been an acting principal for a year prior. Other previous principals include Eugene McGrade, John McCusker and Hugh Colton (deceased).

== Sport ==
Located in rural West Tyrone, where many students do not live in the immediate vicinity of Dromore and depart the school each day on buses, restricts most sports activity to that within breaks during school hours and during Physical Education lessons.

The main success for the school in sport has been in Gaelic football. The school has won numerous Tyrone Vocational Schools Gaelic football titles at under-14 and under-16 level and has won the Ulster Vocational Schools Arthurs Cup (under-16) in 1967, 1974 and most recently in 1999, along with the Ulster Vocational Schools McDevitt Cup (Under 14) in 1977. Several past students have also represented the Tyrone vocational schools' Gaelic football teams in winning Ulster and All-Ireland titles since the late 1960s.

The school has been an important nursery for local Gaelic football clubs in its catchment area, notably Dromore St. Dympna's, Fintona Pearses, Trillick St. Macartan's, Drumquin Wolfe Tones and Drumragh Sarsfields. A large amount of the Dromore squad that won the Tyrone Senior Football Championship for the first time, including captain Fabian O'Neill, were former students of St. John's.

In 2008, Ryan McMenamin and Colm McCullagh, both past students, were starting players of the Tyrone team that won the 2008 All-Ireland Senior Gaelic Football Championship defeating Kerry in the final at Croke Park while Conor O'Neill and Ronan McNabb were both members of the Tyrone team that won the 2008 All-Ireland Minor Gaelic Football Championship defeating Mayo after a replay in Longford with McNabb as team captain.

The school has also had success in ladies' Gaelic football with the winning of the Ulster Under 15 "B" Schools title in 1999 being its biggest success to date. Its most recent championship victory was winning the Tyrone Schools "C" Championship in 2006. Former students to have represented the Tyrone county team included Orla O'Neill, Sinéad McLaughlin, Mairéad McCann and Sonya Maguire. St. John's is also an active participant in school cross-country running competitions.

== Motto ==
The motto of St. John's is "Love One Another", reflecting the Christian values of St. John's. This motto was to be found on a previous version of the school crest. However the modern version does not contain the motto.

== Publications ==
The school has a newsletter called "Hilltop News" which is published several times a year, normally just before half-term and end-of-term breaks. The newsletter covers achievements made by members past and present of the student body and on news of general interest about St. John's.

== Alumni ==
- Ryan McMenamin – 3 time All-Ireland Senior Gaelic Football Championship winner with Tyrone, and 2005 Bank of Ireland GAA Football All-Star winner.
- Colm McCullagh – 2 time All-Ireland Senior Gaelic Football Championship winner with Tyrone and former Irish League Footballer with Omagh Town F.C. and Newry City F.C.
