= Fintona =

Village in County Tyrone, Northern Ireland

Coordinates: 54.497867°N 7.31766°W

Fintona: Irish: Fionntamhnach
- Village
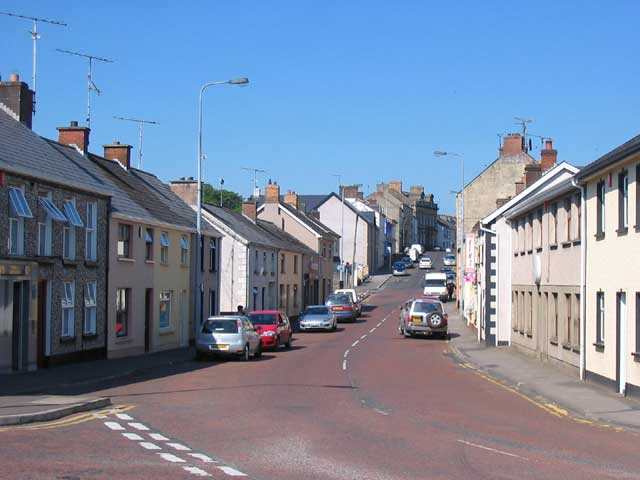
- Main Street

- Location within Northern Ireland
- Area: 1.64 km^{2} (0.63 sq mi)
- Population: 1,217 (2021 census)
  - Density: 742/km^{2} (1,920/sq mi)
- Irish grid reference: H443612
  - Belfast: 56 mi (90 km) E
  - Dublin: 90 mi (140 km) SSE
- Civil parish: Donacavey
- District: Fermanagh and Omagh
- County: Tyrone
- Country: Northern Ireland
- Sovereign state: United Kingdom
- Post town: OMAGH
- Postcode district: BT78
- Dialling code: 028
- ISO 3166 code: GB-FMO
- Police: Northern Ireland
- Fire: Northern Ireland
- Ambulance: Northern Ireland
- UK Parliament: West Tyrone
- NI Assembly: West Tyrone

Fintona (/ˈfɪntənə/; from Irish Fionntamhnach, meaning 'white field'), is a village and townland in County Tyrone, Northern Ireland. Its population at the 2021 census was 1,217.

== Name and etymology ==
Fintona is derived phonetically from the Irish name of the area, Fionntamhnach; this is often translated to mean "white field" however other meanings have been recorded due to various English translations for "fionn" and "tamhnach". "Fionn" may refer to a colour that is described as white, bright, blonde or fair-coloured, while "tamhnach" may refer to a field, clearing, oasis, grassy upland or arable place in a mountain.

In the past, the English spelling of the area has varied, with "Findonagh" in use as recently as 1937 in Church of Ireland documents, while "Fentonagh" and "Fintonagh" were also in use in the 19th century. The current spelling of Fintona has been recorded as first used in 1774.

== History ==
The local area has been known to have had human activity for around 4000 years; there are many burial places, standing stones, stone circles and graves in the area around Fintona. The current village is developed from an Uí Néill fortress built in 1431 and is one of Tyrone's oldest settlements. Some time after the Plantation of Ulster, by 1668 the dominant landowners in the area was the Eccles Family and their Manor House, which was located in what is nowadays Fintona Golf Club and Ecclesville Park on the Ecclesville Demesne, was built in 1703.

As in many other parts of Ireland during the 19th Century, the expansion of the railway network saw the village connected with the rest of the country. There were two stations, Fintona (open 5 June 1853) and Fintona Junction (open 1 May 1856). Connecting the two stations was a horse-drawn tram which took passengers from the village to Fintona Junction railway station which was a stop on the Londonderry and Enniskillen Railway which itself was part of the Great Northern Railway. Both stations closed on 1 October 1957.

=== Horse tram ===
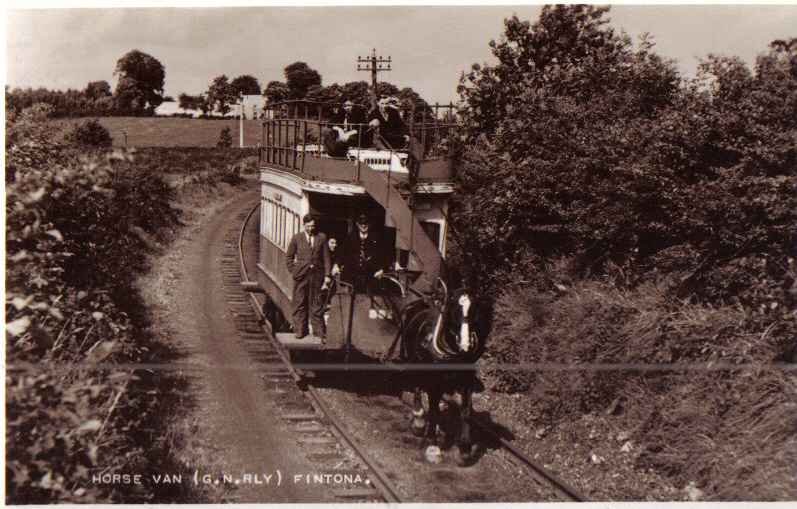
The Fintona horse tram circa 1930

Possibly the most well known bit of history associated with Fintona was the horse-drawn tram (or "van" to the locals) that took passengers from Fintona railway station to Fintona Junction station one mile away. The name of the horse was always "Dick" regardless of sex. First class and second class passengers travelled inside while third class travellers sat exposed to the elements on the top.

The tram made its last trip on 30 September 1957 when the Omagh to Enniskillen line closed, and with it, Fintona's rail links to the rest of Ireland. When retired, it was the second-last existing example of a horse-drawn tram in public service in the British Isles, the only remaining one now being on Douglas promenade, Isle of Man. The "van" now lies at the Ulster Transport Museum.

The legacy of the horse tram's service and identity to Fintona can be seen by the road signs welcoming you into the village, which includes an image or silhouette of the horse tram with "Dick" pulling the tram along with the driver, conductor and a third person on board on the top of the tram.

== Geography ==
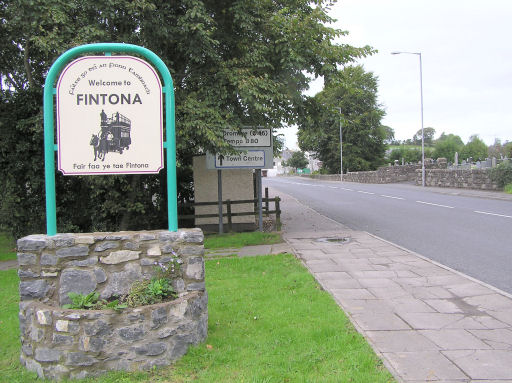
Approaching Fintona from the Ecclesville Road

Fintona lies in the civil parish of Donacavey, in the south west of County Tyrone bordering County Fermanagh. The parish was split between two historical baronies – Fintona itself along with the majority of Donacavey was part of the Clogher barony while a northern portion of the parish lay in the barony of Omagh East.

The village lies across several gentle hills, including Main Street whose centre lies on a hill summit and its ends at the feet of the same hill. There are small pockets of flat ground, mostly at the Ecclesville Demesne. By road distance, Omagh, the county town of Tyrone, lies 8 miles (13 km) north, Enniskillen is 19 miles (31 km) south-west, while Belfast and Dublin are 66 miles (106 km) east and 108 miles (174 km) south-east respectively.

Towards the south-east about 4 miles (6 km) away, about half-way between Fintona and the village of Fivemiletown, the land rises to the summit of Murley Mountain, (known better locally as "Fivemiletown Mountain", also occasionally known as "Stranisk Hill" after its local townland), which has a peak of 312 metres (1,024 feet) above sea level. At this peak and the surrounding land are two close by wind farms, Lendrums Bridge (open 2000) and Hunters Hill (open 2008).

A small river named the "Quiggery Water", whose source is located on the northern slopes of Murley Mountain, flows through Fintona with bridges crossing it at Kiln Street and Mill Street as well as just outside the village at a location known as the Carnlea crossroads. This river then joins with the Ballynahatty Water to form the Drumragh River, which in turn joins the Camowen River in Omagh to form the River Strule.

=== Climate ===
Located 33 miles (53 km) from the Atlantic coastline, Fintona has an Oceanic climate (Köppen climate classification: Cfb). Winters are normally cool to mild with morning frosts being a common occurrence, especially with settled weather. Summers are usually cool to moderate with high temperatures normally around the upper teens, with the warmest temperatures of the season rarely peaking at less than 24 degrees Celsius.

Rainfall is common throughout the year with the wettest months between October and January, and the driest months being April and May.

Sleet and snow showers happen occasionally, usually falling between the months of December and March though it can fall any time between October and May. Snow accumulation usually happens several times each year, though it rarely lies for more than three of four days and sometimes only for a few hours.

Climate data for Fintona (1993 to 2022)
Month	Jan	Feb	Mar	Apr	May	Jun	Jul	Aug	Sep	Oct	Nov	Dec	Year
Record high °C (°F)	14 (57)	15 (59)	17 (63)	18 (64)	23 (73)	28 (82)	29 (84)	26 (79)	24 (75)	18 (64)	16 (61)	13 (55)	29 (84)
Mean daily maximum °C (°F)	7 (45)	8 (46)	9 (48)	11 (52)	14 (57)	16 (61)	17 (63)	17 (63)	15 (59)	12 (54)	10 (50)	8 (46)	12 (54)
Mean daily minimum °C (°F)	4 (39)	4 (39)	4 (39)	5 (41)	8 (46)	10 (50)	12 (54)	12 (54)	10 (50)	8 (46)	6 (43)	4 (39)	7 (45)
Record low °C (°F)	−10 (14)	−6 (21)	−10 (14)	−4 (25)	−2 (28)	4 (39)	4 (39)	5 (41)	0 (32)	−2 (28)	−4 (25)	−11 (12)	−11 (12)
Average precipitation mm (inches)	99 (3.9)	90 (3.5)	74 (2.9)	60 (2.4)	68 (2.7)	75 (3.0)	84 (3.3)	87 (3.4)	84 (3.3)	115 (4.5)	102 (4.0)	112 (4.4)	1,050 (41.3)
Average precipitation days	25	22	21	20	20	20	23	23	21	25	26	25	271
Source: MSN Weather

== Government ==
Fintona lies in the Fermanagh and Omagh District Council local authority area. Prior to the reorganisation of local government in Northern Ireland on 1 April 2015, Fintona was part of Omagh District Council.

For elections, Fintona lies in the Fintona ward. For district council elections the ward makes up part of the district electoral area of West Tyrone (not to be confused with the House of Commons and Northern Ireland Assembly constituencies of the same name) that elects six councillors via the Single Transferable Vote.

For elections to both the House of Commons at Westminster, London and the Northern Ireland Assembly at Stormont, Belfast, the Fintona ward lies in the West Tyrone electoral constituency.

== Economy ==
Fintona is home to a number of small businesses that include two supermarkets, a GP clinic, a veterinary surgery, a restaurant and an optician among other smaller shops, cafes and pubs. A substantial amount of working residents however are employed at locations outside of Fintona, with Omagh and Enniskillen being common.

== Education ==
Fintona has two primary schools: Denamona Primary School (Controlled) and St. Lawrence's Primary School (Catholic Maintained). Both primary schools teach the Northern Ireland Curriculum Key Stages 1 & 2 (Years 1 to 7) to students between the ages of 4 and 11 years, as well as containing a nursery unit, accommodating children in the 3–4-years-old age group.

In April 2017, St. Lawrence's P.S. won the junior category of the BBC Radio Ulster School Choir of the Year, which was broadcast live on the radio station.

Two other primary schools, St. Patrick's (townland of Garvallagh) and St. Joseph's (townland of Lisconrea), both Catholic Maintained, closed due to falling enrolments; St. Joseph's in 2003 and St. Patrick's in 2009.

There are no post-primary schools in Fintona, children continue their education at schools usually either in Omagh, Dromore or Fivemiletown, while a few also attended schools in Ballygawley and Enniskillen.

=== Fintona Library ===
Fintona has its own branch library that was originally opened in the early 1980s in a prefabricated building in Ecclesville Park. The library moved to its current location on Main Street in 1991.

In early 2011, the library was one of ten marked for closure by Libraries NI. Libraries NI had stated that the library was one of the least-used in Northern Ireland and that the roof of the building required repair at a significant cost. At a public consultation meeting, held at Fintona Golf Club in March 2011, there were local calls for the retention of the library, while representations were also made to the Committee for Culture, Arts and Leisure of the Northern Ireland Assembly. On 20 October 2011, Libraries NI announced that the Fintona branch library would remain open while efforts were made to either improve its premises or find an alternative location. It was confirmed, in July 2013, that the library building would receive a full refurbishment.

As of 2025, the library is open three days a week, On Wednesdays, Thursdays and Saturdays.

== Transport ==
Fintona today is linked to Omagh though the B122 that connects to the A5 Omagh to Ballygawley road about 2 miles (3 km) outside Omagh. Other roads linking Fintona to elsewhere include the B80 to Enniskillen (via Tempo), the B46 to Dromore, the B122 to Fivemiletown, the B46 to Seskinore and Beragh, the B168 to Clogher and the Derrybard and Greenmount roads that connect to the A5 Omagh to Ballygawley road on to towards Belfast and Dublin.

=== Public transport ===
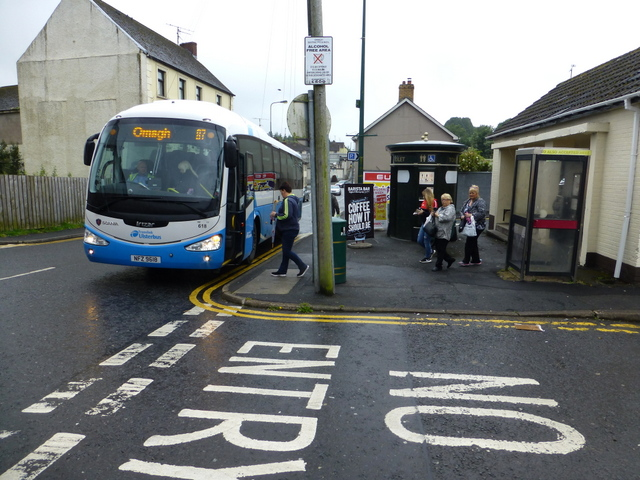
Ulsterbus Service 87 to Omagh

The only public transport available is an Ulsterbus bus service provided by Translink that connects Fintona to Omagh (Service No. 87). Seven services run on weekdays and five on Saturdays. There is no service on Sundays.

Fintona had been connected to the railway network via Fintona and Fintona Junction stations on the Londonderry and Enniskillen Railway's horse-drawn spur line (see #Horse tram section). These stations opened in the 1850s, but were closed in October 1957.

== Sport and leisure ==
There are numerous sports clubs and facilities in Fintona which cater for a range of activities. Local clubs include Fintona Cycling Club, Fintona Badminton Club and two bowling clubs.

=== Fintona Golf Club ===
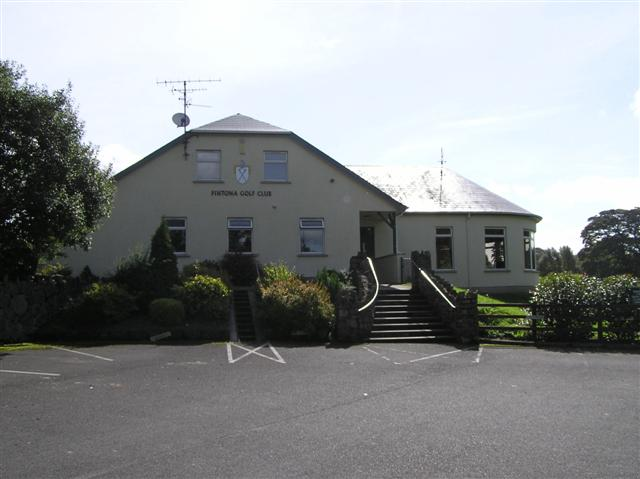
Fintona Golf Club

Fintona Golf Club was founded in 1904 by C.W.L. Brown-Lecky and is located on part of the Ecclesville Demesne. It is a nine-hole course which have twin tees allowing players a different challenge on their second time round. Ronan Rafferty rated it the best nine-hole course in Northern Ireland in a feature on the TV programme 'Ronan Rafferty's Great Golf Journeys'. The course includes a club house and a bar with a function room and catering facilities. In September 2021 the club won the All-Ireland AIG Women's Challenge Cup at Shandon Park in Belfast after defeating Gort in the Final.

=== Fintona Pearses GAA Club ===
Fintona Pearses GAA club was founded in late 1916 and first played competitive Gaelic football games a year later. There was already a GAA club in Fintona at the time, the Davitts, which was founded in 1907 and won the Tyrone Senior Football Championship in 1914 but the Davitts folded not long after the Pearses club started, whom themselves went on to win a Tyrone SFC title in 1938. The current club is based at its own grounds just outside the town on the Tattymoyle Road in the townland of Tonnaghbane, named St. Lawrence's Park which has undergone substantial redevelopment since the early 1990s which today includes two full-size pitches (one with floodlights), a smaller training pitch, a clubhouse with four changing rooms and two stands (one roofed). Gaelic football teams are fielded at adult and underage levels along with hurling teams at underage levels. A Ladies Gaelic Football club of the same name, fielding teams at adult and underage levels, also play their games at the same ground.

In 2023, the Senior Men's Gaelic Football team won the Tyrone Junior Football Championship after defeating Drumragh in the final in Healy Park, Omagh by 1-10 (13 pts) to 0-12 (12 pts) after extra time.

=== Fintona Swifts Football Club ===
Fintona Swifts are a Junior Football Club that was originally founded in the early 1990s and affiliated to the Fermanagh & Western FA. Up until the 2010/11 season the team did not have a home ground in the village and was forced to play their 'home' games elsewhere, normally in Omagh. After years of discussions and stalling, the club finally had a permanent home in Fintona with a pitch based at the Ecclesville Demesne opened in August 2010. In August 2015, the club was disbanded after withdrawing from the Fermanagh & Western Football League, a lack of player numbers cited as the reason for folding. A year later, the club was reformed and in its first season back won the Fermanagh & Western Division 3 League. A reserve team was reintroduced at the start of the 2019/20 season. For the 2025/26 season the first team will play in Division 2 of the Fermanagh and Western Football League while the reserve team will play in the corresponding Reserve Division 3 as well as entering the Fermanagh and Western FA Mulhern & Rehill cup competitions, and the IFA Junior Cup.

=== Ecclesville Centre ===
Based within the grounds of the Ecclesville Demesne and opened in 1995, the Ecclesville Centre is a combined equestrian and community/leisure complex. The facility is used not only for show jumping and horse riding, but also for other sporting activities – including those based indoors. The equestrian end of the centre includes stables, an indoor arena with judges box and seated stand, and an outdoor facility that includes an outdoor floodlight arena, open parkland and the forest of the Ecclesville Demesne. The leisure part of the centre includes a minor hall, a sports hall, changing rooms and a fitness suite with outdoor all-weather tennis courts also available. The centre is used as a venue for local and regional sports competitions including badminton and indoor football. At a community level, the centre is the home of Fintona Cross-Community Youth Club and also a local Sure Start centre.

The centre has also been the venue for several special events and exhibitions. These have included exhibitions of farm machinery, sport and modified cars and music concerts. The annual Northern Ireland National Charolais Show has also been held at the centre as has the Omagh and District Canine Club Dog Show.

=== Parks ===
The main public park in Fintona, at Ecclesville Demesne, is known as Ecclesville Park. The park has a play-area for children and all-weather football and basketball area used alongside the Ecclesville Centre, several walking routes, a pond and forest. In 2014, additional work was undertaken to extended the play-area and to add an outdoor gym.

There is also a children's play-area at Ashfield Gardens. Previous play-areas in Mill Street and Denamona Court were converted to "Green Spaces" in 2023.

== Places of worship ==
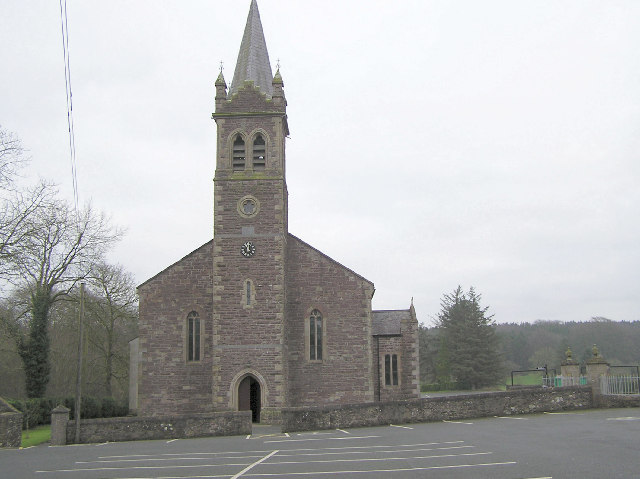
St. Lawrence's Catholic Church

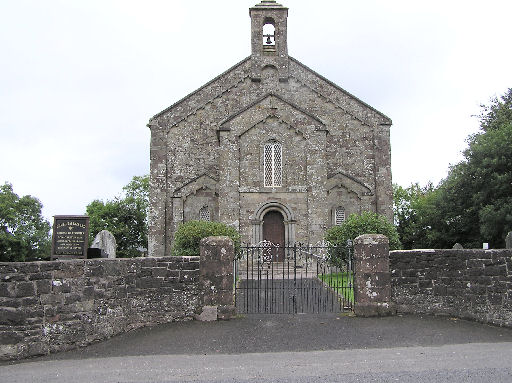
Donacavey Parish Church (Church of Ireland)

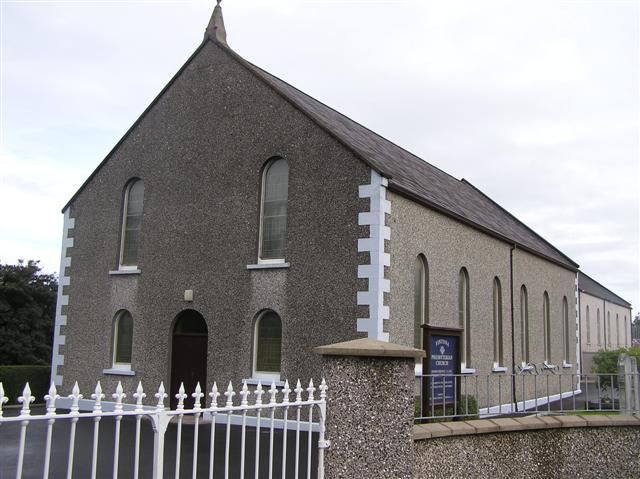
Fintona Presbyterian Church

=== Catholic ===
Fintona lies in the Catholic parish of Donacavey, which is a part of the Catholic Diocese of Clogher. There is a single church serving the parish called St. Lawrence's, which is located outside the village next to Lisdergan Road. The church also has two nearby graveyards named "St. Peter's and St. Paul's" and "St. Lawrence's", as well as a church hall called St. Patrick's that is located on Main Street in the village.

=== Christian Brethren ===
A Christian Brethren group is based at Fintona Gospel Hall, located on the edge of the village on the Loughmuck Road.

=== Church of Ireland ===
Fintona lies in the parish of Donacavey, which is a part of the Church of Ireland Diocese of Clogher. The parish church is located next to the Ecclesville Road with a church hall lying across the same road, opposite the church.

The church parish of Donacavey contains only part of the civil parish of Donacavey; the south western corner of the civil parish is served by a separate parish of Barr that has its own parish church. However, both parishes are covered by the same rector whom serves "Donacavey and Barr".

=== Methodist ===
Fintona Methodist Church lies on the Craigavon Road, next to the Fintona Presbyterian Church. It is part of the Omagh and Fintona circuit in the North Western district of the Methodist Church in Ireland.

=== Methodist (Independent) ===
Fintona Independent Methodist Church is located on Kiln Street and is an outreach ministry from its parent church in Omagh. It is part of the Fellowship of Independent Methodist Churches based in Northern Ireland.

=== Presbyterian ===
Fintona Presbyterian Church lies on the Craigavon Road next to the Fintona Methodist Church. A church hall lies behind the church building. It is part of the Omagh Presbytery in the Presbyterian Church in Ireland.

== Media and communications ==
In the late 1980s and early 1990s a monthly local news magazine, the Village Voice, was published by the now defunct Fintona Development Association. The magazine covered news, features and activities in Fintona, Seskinore and Eskra. As of October 2021, local events in Fintona are often covered by Omagh-based newspapers, the Tyrone Constitution, the Tyrone Herald and the Ulster Herald.

A Post Office branch is located inside Supervalu supermarket on the Tattymoyle Road with daily collections (inc. Saturdays). Local postcodes are normally in the form of BT78 2xx.

An Openreach telephone exchange lies just outside the village on the Castletown Road, serving Fintona as well as Seskinore and much of Eskra and Tattyreagh. The STD code is 028 in common with the rest of Northern Ireland, with local numbers assigned by BT being in the format 8284xxxx. The exchange was enabled for ADSL broadband in September 2004, while the first Fibre to the Cabinet broadband services went live on 30 December 2010. Openreach Fibre to the Premises (FTTP) connections are also available at some premises.

A Fibre to the Premises network operated by Fibrus also exists in Fintona, having come into service in August 2021.

Terrestrial Television along with FM and DAB radio can be received from the Brougher Mountain and Strabane transmitting stations, while similar TV and radio services from the Republic of Ireland can also be received by most people in Fintona. There are no cable operators in the village.

== Demography ==
Fintona is classified as a village by the NI Statistics and Research Agency (NISRA) (i.e., with population between 1,000 and 2,250 people)

=== 2021 census ===
National Identity of Fintona residents (2021)
Nationality	Per cent
Irish	40.95%
Northern Irish	33.25%
British	24.57%

As of the census day in 2021 (21 March 2021), there were 1,217 people living in Fintona (defined as the "West Tyrone D" Super Data Zone), accounting for 0.06% of the Northern Ireland total. Of these:

- 19.97% were aged under 16, 61.96% were aged between 16-65 and 18.08% were aged 66 and over.
- 51.31% of the usually resident population were female and 48.69% were male.
- 87.6% were born in Northern Ireland, 7.23% were born in the rest of the United Kingdom or Republic of Ireland and 5.18% were born elsewhere.
- 71.32% belong to or were brought up in the Catholic Christian faith, 20.3% belong to or were brought up in Protestant and other Christian (including Christian related) denominations, 0.82% belong to or were brought up in other religions and 7.56% belong to no religion.
- 40.95% had an Irish national identity, 33.25% had a Northern Irish national identity, 24.57% had a British national identity, and 6.31% had an 'other' national identity (respondents could indicate more than one national identity).
- 35% held a United Kingdom passport, 31.31% held an Irish passport and 5.26% held a passport for a country other than the UK and Ireland.
- 14.18% had some knowledge of Irish, 4.44% had some knowledge of Ulster-Scots and 2.71% did not have English as their first language.

=== 2011 census ===
On census day in 2011 (27 March 2011), there were 1,164 people living in Fintona, accounting for 0.06% of the Northern Ireland total. Of these:

- 17.10% were aged under 16 years and 16.41% were aged 65 and over.
- 40 years was the average (median) age of the population.
- 52.32% of the usually resident population were female and 47.68% were male.
- 72.16% belong to or were brought up in the Catholic Christian faith and 26.55% belong to or were brought up in a 'Protestant and other Christian (including Christian related)' denominations.
- 35.22% indicated that they had an Irish national identity, 33.42% had a Northern Irish national identity and 31.62% had a British national identity (respondents could indicate more than one national identity).
- 15.56% had some knowledge of Irish and 3.15% had some knowledge of Ulster-Scots. 4.05% did not have English as their first language (considering the populations aged 3 years old and over).

=== 2001 census ===
On census day in 2001 (29 April 2001), there were 1,359 people living in Fintona. Of these:

- 24.95% were aged under 16 years and 13.02% were aged 65 and over.
- 34 years was the average (median) age of the population.
- 51.66% of the usually resident population were female and 48.34% were male.
- 72.26% belong to or were brought up in the Catholic Christian faith and 27.08% belong to or were brought up in a 'Protestant and other Christian (including Christian related)' denominations.
- 11.73% had some knowledge of Irish.

=== Census records in the 20th century ===
Records from the census conducted in 1911 and published in 1913 revealed the population of Fintona to be 1,107 in 1901 and 1,100 in 1911.

Population figures, Census of Ireland 1901 – 1911
Year	1901	1911
Fintona	1107	1100

=== Census records in the 19th century ===
The population of the village of Fintona measured in the census between 1841 and 1891 varied slightly overall, with a peak of 1,504 persons in 1851 and a low of 1,271 in 1891. In the remainder of the Parish of Donacavey, population figures fell continuously from that recorded in 1841.

Population figures, Census of Ireland 1841 – 1891
Year	1841	1851	1861	1871	1881	1891
Fintona	1327	1504	1410	1338	1468	1271
Donacavey (Clogher)¹	7980	5972	5367	4746	4210	3551
Donacavey (Omagh East)²	1992	1349	1265	1146	989	812
Total (Donacavey Parish)	11299	8825	8042	7230	6667	5634

¹ Refers to population in the part of Donacavey that lay in the Barony of Clogher, excluding Fintona village.
² Refers to population in the part of Donacavey that lay in the Barony of Omagh East.

== Fintona townland ==
At 20.63 acres (8.35 ha), Fintona is the smallest townland in the civil parish of Donacavey.

Census records from the period of 1841 to 1891 do not list population or house numbers for the townland, instead publishing such figures for "Fintona Town". The 1891 census records state "The town of Fintona stands on the townlands of Castletown, Edenasop West, Fintona and Lisky; its estimated area is 44 acres".

== Notable people ==
- Gerry Armstrong (born 1954), Northern Irish footballer, born in Fintona
- Alan Buchanan (1905–1984), Church of Ireland Archbishop of Dublin
- John of Fintona, fl. late thirteenth century
- Edward Maginn (1802−1849), Roman Catholic coadjutor bishop of Derry
- John Montague (1929−2016), poet

== See also ==
- List of places in County Tyrone
- List of towns and villages in Northern Ireland
