= Drumragh =

Drumragh may refer to:

- Drumragh (Electoral Ward) in Omagh, County Tyrone
- Drumragh, County Tyrone, a civil parish and townland in County Tyrone, Northern Ireland
- Drumragh Sarsfields, a Gaelic Athletic Association club from Clanabogan, County Tyrone, Northern Ireland
- Drumragh Integrated College, an integrated Secondary school in Omagh, County Tyrone
- River Drumragh, runs through Omagh, County Tyrone, Northern Ireland
