= Tonnagh =

Tonnagh may refer to the following places in Northern Ireland:

- Tonnagh Beg
- Tonnagh More
