= A505 road (Northern Ireland) =

East–west route in County Tyrone

Coordinates: 54.6514°N 7.0271°W

A505

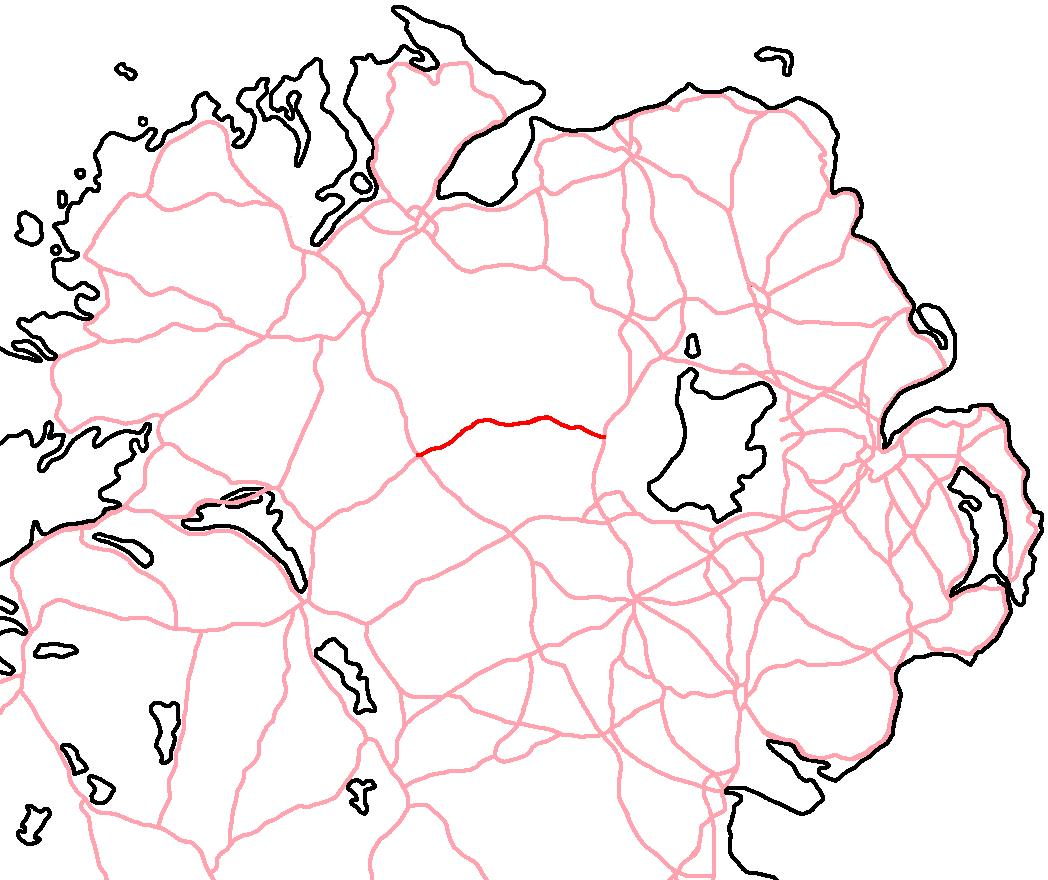
- Route of the A505 in red from Omagh to Cookstown in County Tyrone

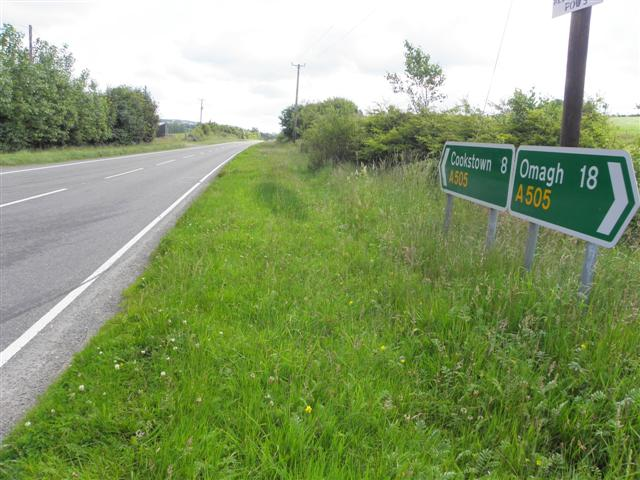

Major junctions
- West end: Omagh
- East end: Cookstown

Location
- Country: United Kingdom
- Constituent country: Northern Ireland
- Primary destinations: Killyclogher Mountfield; Creggan; Dunnamore Kildress

Road network
- Roads in Northern Ireland; Motorways; A roads in Northern Ireland

The A505 is an east–west road from Omagh to Cookstown in County Tyrone, Northern Ireland. It passes Killyclogher, Mountfield, Creggan, Dunnamore, and Kildress.

The road traverses the southern arc of the Sperrin Mountains. It serves much of the rural community of the locality, as well as An Creagán cultural centre, Dunnamore stone circles, Wellbrook Beetling Mill, and Drum Manor Forest Park.
