= Sir William Thompson =

Sir William Thompson or Thomson may refer to:

- Sir William Thompson (1614–1681) (1614–1681), of London, English businessman and politician
- Sir William Thompson (Ipswich MP) (1678–1739), of Middle Temple, an English judge and Whig politician
- William Thomson, 1st Baron Kelvin (1824–1907), British mathematical physicist and engineer
- Sir William Thompson (physician) (1861–1929), Irish physician
