= Strule Arts Centre =

Venue in County Tyrone, Northern Ireland

- Ionad Ealaíne na Sruthaile, Strule Hoose o Airts
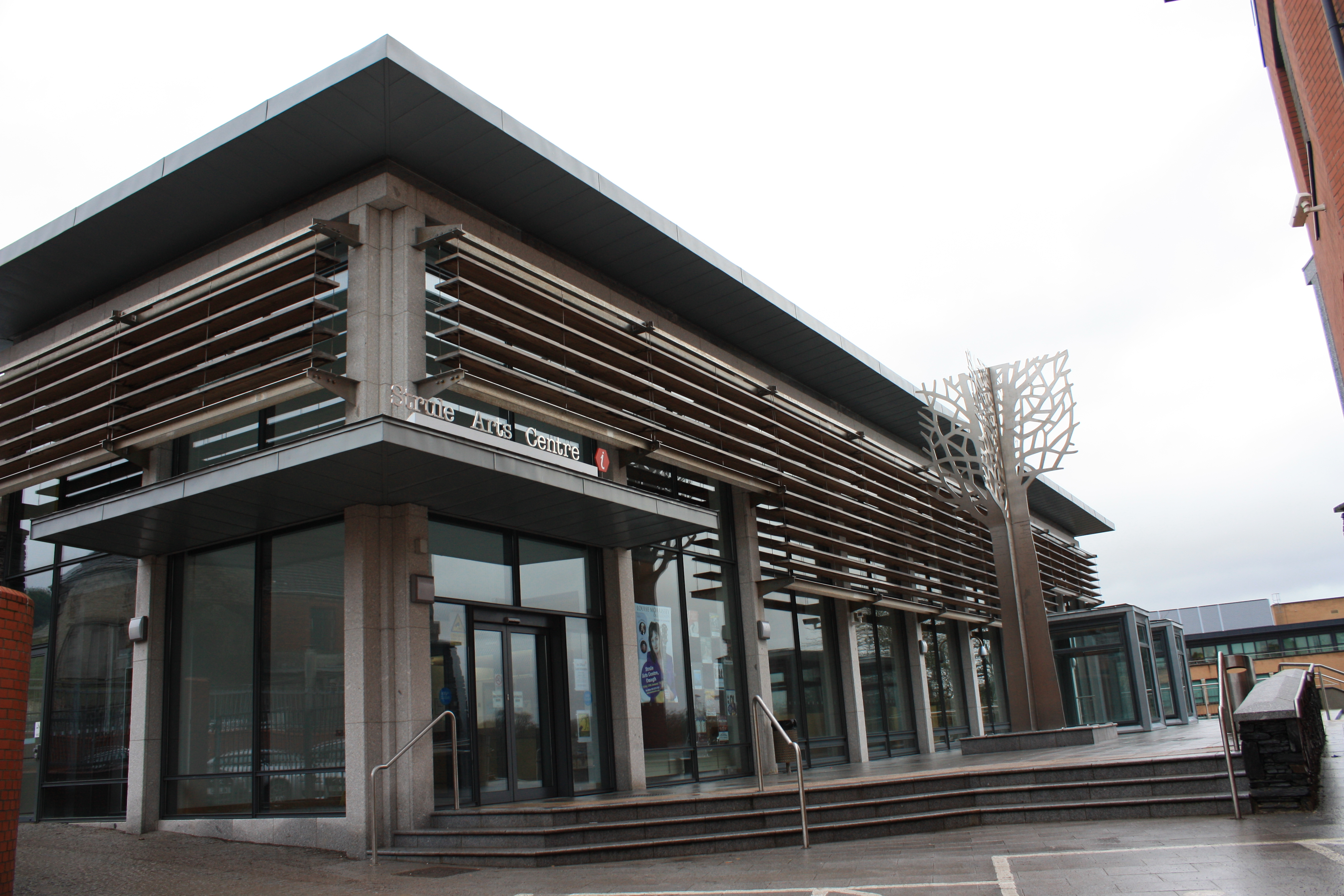
- Interactive map of the Strule Arts Centre area

General information
- Location: Omagh, Northern Ireland, Townhall Square, Omagh BT78 1BL, United Kingdom
- Coordinates: 54.6006968°N 7.3031620°W

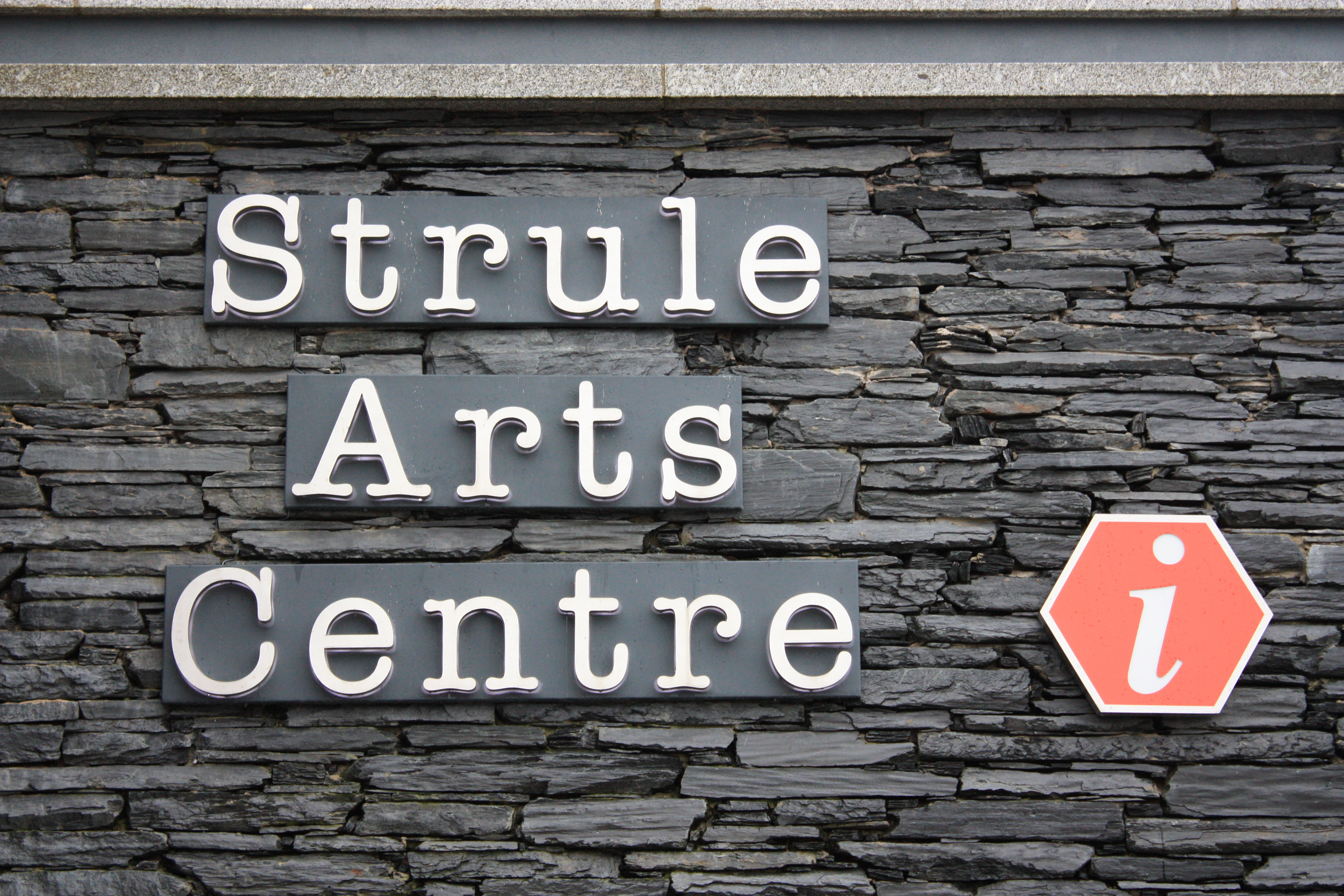
Strule Arts Centre signage

Strule Arts Centre (Irish: Ionad Ealaíne na Sruthaile; Ulster-Scots: Strule Hoose o Airts) is a multi-purpose arts venue in Omagh, County Tyrone, Northern Ireland. The Omagh tourist information office is located on the ground floor. The centre is owned and run by Fermanagh and Omagh District Council.

== History ==
In 2003 Omagh's Town Hall was demolished to make way for the new Strule Arts Centre Arts. It cost £10.5 million and opened on 8 June 2007, overlooking the River Strule which flows through the town centre. It is part of a wider regeneration project for the High Street, George Street and Riverside area of Omagh. It was designed by architects Kennedy Fitzgerald and Associates. The centre was officially opened in January 2008 by Edwin Poots, then Minister for Culture, Arts and Leisure, and Margaret Ritchie, Minister for Social Development.
