= Mountfield, County Tyrone =

Mountfield
- Village
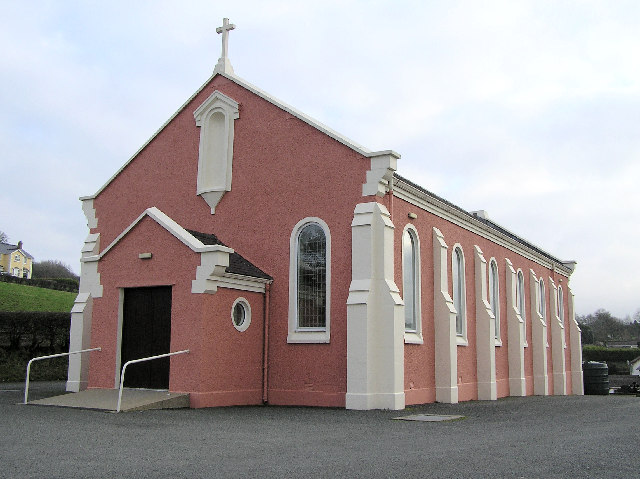
- Corpus Cristi Church, Mountfield

- Location within Northern Ireland Location within the United Kingdom
- Coordinates: 54°38′49″N 7°10′09″W
- Country: United Kingdom
- Constituent country: Northern Ireland
- County: County Tyrone
- Townland: Aghalane

Population (2021)
  - Total: 903

Mountfield (Irish: Achadh Ard) is a small village in County Tyrone, Northern Ireland. It is within the townland of Aghalane, northeast of Omagh. It lies on the A505 road and had a population of 903 in the 2021 Census. It is set in a stretch of undulating countryside and is regarded as a gateway to the Sperrin Mountains.

The village was developed mainly in the 19th century by Sir William McMahon and today is a quiet, tranquil place with its economy dependent on agriculture.

Mountfield is part of the Fermanagh and Omagh District Council area.

== Sport ==
Mountfield is the home of Mountfield F.C. Set up 2014, Mountfield is the home of Sperrin Óg Ladies Gaelic Football Club.

== See also ==
- List of towns and villages in Northern Ireland
