= Tattyreagh =

Coordinates: 54.49°N 7.31°W

Tattyreagh: Irish: An Táite Riabhach
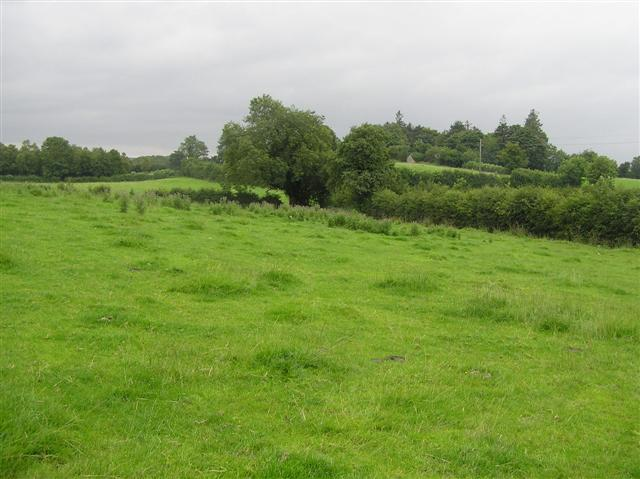
- Tattyreagh townland

- Location within Northern Ireland
- Population: 125
- District: Omagh
- County: Tyrone
- Country: Northern Ireland
- Sovereign state: United Kingdom
- Post town: OMAGH
- Postcode district: BT78
- Dialling code: 028
- Police: Northern Ireland
- Fire: Northern Ireland
- Ambulance: Northern Ireland
- UK Parliament: Tyrone West

Tattyreagh (from Irish: An Táite Riabhach meaning "the striped/tabby field") is a small townland near Seskinore in County Tyrone, Northern Ireland, and is situated within Omagh District Council area. Tattyreagh townland is approximately 258 acres (0.4 sq mi) in area.

Over the past 10 years, rapid growth has emerged in this small rural community with new private housing. It consists of mainly residential houses and farms, one Catholic primary school (Sacred Heart PS), Tattyreagh St. Patrick's Gaelic Athletic Association club, Darcy Park, and a public house. Cutting through the area is one main road leading from Omagh to Fintona.
