= Sandholes =

Rural village in Northern Ireland

Coordinates: 54°35′38″N 6°46′48″W

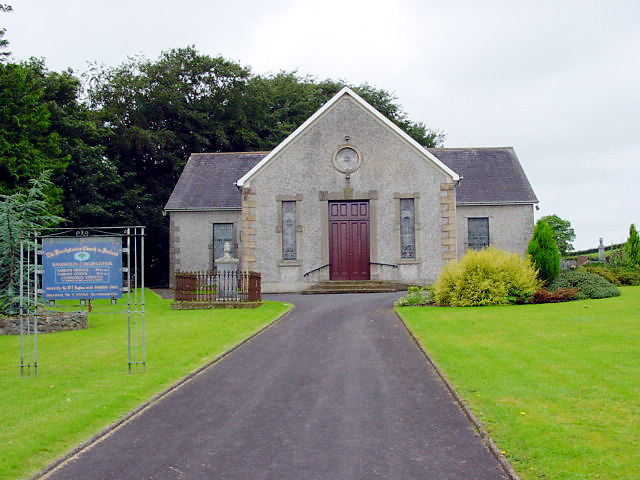
- Sandholes Presbyterian Church

- Location within Northern Ireland
- Area: 0.058 sq mi (0.15 km^{2})
- Population: 126 (2011 Census)
  - Density: 2,172/sq mi (839/km^{2})
- Irish grid reference: H8178
  - Belfast: 34 miles
- District: Mid-Ulster
- County: County Tyrone
- Country: Northern Ireland
- Sovereign state: United Kingdom
- Post town: COOKSTOWN
- Postcode district: BT80
- Dialling code: 028
- UK Parliament: Mid Ulster
- NI Assembly: Mid Ulster

Sandholes is a small rural village, located at a crossroads approximately 3 1/2 miles (5.6 km) south of Cookstown in County Tyrone, Northern Ireland. The settlement is compact, with a modest range of services and community facilities. Existing dwellings are located within the core of the village and in small housing developments on the periphery. According to the 2011 census it has a population of 126 in 50 households.

== Education ==
The village formerly held a primary school, which no longer exists.

== Religion ==
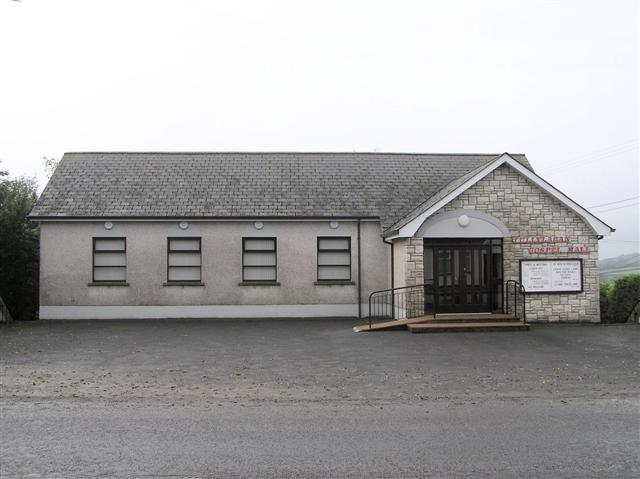
Tullylagan Gospel Hall

The Sandholes Presbyterian Church serves Sandholes, the current church replaced the original in 1798 and was extended in 1862. A new modern church hall was built in 2016 to replace the one built in 1962. The village also holds Tullylagan Gospel Hall.

== Places of interest ==
- Tullylagan House Hotel is a 19th-century Manor House Hotel which is set in 30 acres (12 ha) of its own private grounds and landscaped gardens with the Tullylagan River flowing through the estate.
- Tullylagan Vintage Owners Association have 14 acres (5.7 ha) at Berkeley's Farm, in the townland of Gallanagh (meaning white marsh), and here the association keeps the traditional methods of farming alive.

== See also ==
- List of places in County Tyrone
- List of villages in Northern Ireland
