= Dromore, County Tyrone =

Town in County Tyrone, Northern Ireland

Coordinates: 54.513309°N 7.458858°W

Dromore: Irish: Droim Mór
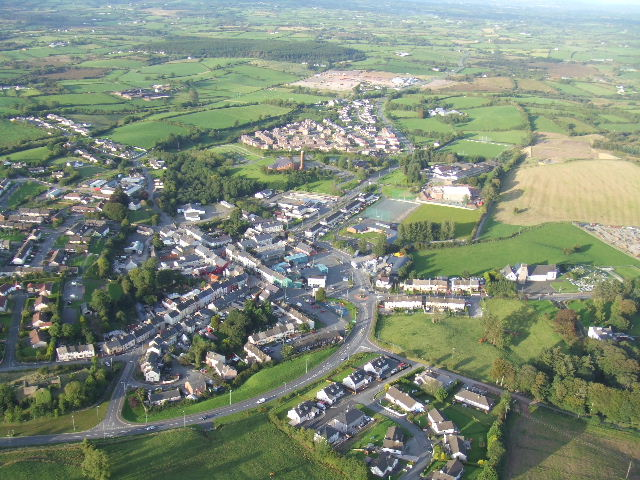

- Location within Northern Ireland
- Population: 1,198 (2011 Census)
- Irish grid reference: H349628
  - Belfast: 76 mi (122 km)
- District: Fermanagh and Omagh
- County: County Tyrone
- Country: Northern Ireland
- Sovereign state: United Kingdom
- Post town: OMAGH
- Postcode district: BT78
- Dialling code: 028, +44 28
- UK Parliament: West Tyrone
- NI Assembly: West Tyrone

Dromore (from Irish An Droim Mór, meaning 'the large ridge') is a town, townland and civil parish in County Tyrone, Northern Ireland. It is nine miles (14 km) south west of Omagh on the A32 and sixteen miles (26 km) from Enniskillen. The population of Dromore was 1,198 at the 2011 Census.

== History ==
The town was originally built in 1757 when the then Lord of the manor, William Hamilton, of Aughlish House gave a grant of the townland of Mullinacross, now called Dromore, to two families, theStewart and Humphreys. The town at that time consisted of only four houses. The original name of the townland is derived from an ancient stone cross which formerly stood on the top of the hill overlooking the town, and near to where the Cistercian Abbey was located. This abbey which was destroyed by a fire in 1690 is said to have been built on the site of a nunnery founded by Saint Patrick for Saint Cettumbria, the first Irish female who received the veil from his hands. In the village, still to be seen, are the ivy-clad remains of a Protestant church built in 1694.

During the Irish Rebellion of 1798, when Lord Blayney came to Tyrone, as Dromore was principally inhabited by rebels, he set it on fire and burned some of the houses, but owing to the exertions of Captain Charles Muirhead, Lieutenant James Alexander and the Rev. Benjamin Marshall the balance of the town was saved from destruction.

In the area around Dromore are to be found a number of ancient earthen forts. At Dullaghan about four miles to the northwest is a Druid's Altar - a small roofless chamber tomb. A tannery was known to have existed in the village.

In the Dromore Parish at least nine locations of Mass Rocks are known. During the times of the Penal Laws certain "Mass Gardens" were located in the district where the local parishioners met in seclusion to celebrate Mass. It is said that Lord Belmore, who owned considerable property around Dromore, was so impressed with the devotion of the congregation at one of these gatherings, which he came across one day by chance, that he made available a piece of ground for the erection of a church with a condition that the chapel could not be seen from the village. Hence St Dympnas Chapel was built in a hollow. St Davogs chapel built in 1987 is where the Catholic Church of Dromore now stands.

In April 1921, during the Irish War of Independence, the Irish Republican Army (IRA) ambushed Royal Irish Constabulary (RIC) patrols in the area. On the night of 6–7 April, an RIC sergeant shot and wounded a Catholic girl on the main street in a sectarian attack. He was then shot dead by the girl's brother, an IRA volunteer. In reprisal, Special Constables took three local IRA volunteers from their homes and summarily executed them, dumping their bodies by the roadside.

== Townlands of Dromore ==
Early Irish ancestors gave us the vast bulk of the local placenames we use to this day, especially our townland names. The words in Irish for hill (druim, cnoc, cor, iomaire, mullan, tulach) predominate. The name "Dromore" (Droim Mor) itself means "the great ridge". The word "meen" (found in Meenagowan and Meenagar) shows the wet, healthy nature of much of the land. Dromore parish consists of over sixty townlands; roughly elliptical in shape, it is bounded on the north by Drumquin, on the south by Trillick, on the west by Ederney and on the east by Omagh and Fintona.

Nowadays, townland names in particular are under threat owing to a new computerised system of addresses for rural homes, a system suited to areas in Great Britain where townlands do not exist. Roads are now to be given arbitrary names by administrators who do not possess a deep knowledge of the area, attaching arbitrary house numbers to them. For example, the former Corbally Road is to be known as 'St. Dympnas Road', on the specious argument that St. Dympna's Catholic Church is situated near it. This inevitably has met considerable opposition with local residents who value of these ancient names as badges of personal identification, and many will continue to use them to preserve the ancient names for future generations and residents.

== Demography ==
=== 19th century population ===
The population of Dromore village increased slightly overall during the 19th century:

Year	1841	1851	1861	1871	1881	1891
Population	551	581	579	641	625	574
Houses	117	110	131	125	138	131

=== 21st century population ===
Dromore is classified as a village by the Northern Ireland Statistics and Research Agency (NISRA) (i.e. with population between 1,000 and 2,499 people). On Census Day (27 March 2011) the usually resident population of Dromore Settlement was 1,198, accounting for 0.07% of the NI total. Of these:

- 23.96% were aged under 16 years and 13.44% were aged 65 and over
- 48.58% of the population were male and 51.42% were female
- 85.89% were from a Catholic background and 11.44% were from a 'Protestant and Other Christian (including Christian related)' background

== Sport ==
- Dromore St. Dympna's is the local GAA club.
- Tummery Athletic is the local Soccer club.
- Dromore Ladies GFC [Gaelic Football Club]

== Dromore townland ==
The townland is situated in the historic barony of Omagh East and the civil parish of Dromore and covers an area of 157 acres.

The population of the townland (excluding Dromore village) declined during the 19th century:

Year	1841	1851	1861	1871	1881	1891
Population	27	28	-	-	-	12
Houses	5	7	-	-	-	3

== Climate ==
Climate in this area has mild differences between highs and lows, and there is adequate rainfall year-round. The Köppen Climate Classification subtype for this climate is "Cfb" (Marine West Coast Climate/Oceanic climate).

Climate data for Dromore
Month	Jan	Feb	Mar	Apr	May	Jun	Jul	Aug	Sep	Oct	Nov	Dec	Year
Mean daily maximum °C (°F)	8 (46)	8 (46)	10 (50)	12 (54)	15 (59)	17 (63)	19 (66)	19 (66)	17 (63)	13 (55)	10 (50)	8 (46)	13 (55)
Mean daily minimum °C (°F)	3 (37)	2 (36)	3 (37)	4 (39)	7 (45)	10 (50)	12 (54)	12 (54)	9 (48)	7 (45)	4 (39)	2 (35)	6 (43)
Average precipitation mm (inches)	110 (4.3)	76 (3)	79 (3.1)	74 (2.9)	64 (2.5)	61 (2.4)	74 (2.9)	79 (3.1)	74 (2.9)	110 (4.3)	99 (3.9)	130 (5.2)	1,030 (40.4)
Source: Weatherbase

== See also ==
- Abbeys and priories in Northern Ireland (County Tyrone)
- St. John's Business and Enterprise College
- List of civil parishes of County Tyrone
- List of townlands of County Tyrone
