= Killing of Ronan Kerr =

2011 killing in Northern Ireland

- Part of Dissident Irish Republican campaign
- Location: Omagh, County Tyrone, Northern Ireland
- Date: 2 April 2011; 4:00 pm
- Target: Ronan Kerr
- Attack type: booby-trap
- Deaths: 1
- Injuries: 0

On 2 April 2011, Ronan Kerr, a 25‑year‑old Police Service of Northern Ireland (PSNI) constable, was killed by a booby‑trap car bomb outside his home in Killyclogher, near Omagh, County Tyrone, Northern Ireland. A dissident republican group later claimed responsibility.

His killing prompted widespread condemnation across Northern Ireland and internationally, leading to large public rallies and cross‑community expressions of support. The subsequent police investigation produced multiple arrests over several years, though no one has been convicted.

== Killing ==
Constable Ronan Kerr was killed on 2 April 2011 when a booby-trap car bomb exploded outside his home at Highfield Close, near Killyclogher on the northern outskirts of Omagh in County Tyrone, just before 4 pm. The device had been planted under his vehicle and detonated as he approached it. Responsibility for the attack was later claimed by a dissident republican group stating that it was composed of former members of the Provisional IRA.

Kerr, who was 25 at the time of his death, began his training with the Police Service of Northern Ireland at the Garnerville college in May 2010 and was assigned to F District that December. His first posting was with the neighbourhood policing team in Enniskillen, before transferring to a response unit at the end of March 2011. He was a Roman Catholic officer in a service in which Catholics then made up roughly 30% of the personnel. He was also a member of the Beragh Red Knights Gaelic Athletic Association club.

=== Funeral ===
Kerr's funeral took place on 6 April at the Church of the Immaculate Conception in his home village of Beragh. The service was attended by political representatives from Northern Ireland and the Republic of Ireland, senior officers from the Police Service of Northern Ireland, the Garda Síochána, and several church leaders.

Members of Kerr's local Gaelic Athletic Association club stood alongside PSNI officers to form a guard of honour. The GAA had previously prohibited membership by security force personnel, a rule that was removed after the establishment of the PSNI in 2001.

Books of condolence were made available at a number of locations across Northern Ireland, and a reward was offered for information relevant to the investigation.

== Reaction ==
Kerr's killing was condemned by almost all sections of Northern Irish politics and society, as well as attracting international condemnation. On the day of his funeral, a peace rally organised in Belfast by the Irish Congress of Trade Unions (Ictu) was reported to have been attended by up to 7,000 people. Similar events were held in Omagh, Enniskillen, and London.

BBC Ireland correspondent Mark Simpson commented on the unified response of the community, stating that "A murder designed to divide people has actually brought them closer together."

Graffiti praising the killing was daubed on walls in predominantly republican areas of Derry.

== Investigation ==
On 26 July 2011, five men were arrested in connection with the investigation. They were later released.

On 26 November 2012, detectives announced the arrest of a 22-year-old man in Milton Keynes. The following day, a 39-year-old man in County Tyrone was arrested and questioned.

On 16 May 2017, officers from the PSNI's Serious Crime Branch arrested two men under the Terrorism Act in connection with the killing. A 27-year-old man was arrested in Omagh, and a 40-year-old man was produced into police custody from prison.

In June 2018, a man from Coalisland, County Tyrone, was charged with three terrorism‑related offences connected to searches carried out during the investigation. The charges were dropped in June 2019.
