= John of Fintona =

John of Fintona (fl. late 13th century) was an Irish writer.

Called "subtillissimus canonum doctor/a most subtle teacher of canon law" by Tommaso Diplovataccio, John was the compiler of a commentary on decretals.

John was a native of Fintona, County Tyrone, Ireland. John was from the Mac Giolla Coisgle (McCusker) clan from Fintona, who were acclaimed canon lawyers in the 1200s to 1400s in the parish of Derrybrusk, which Fintona was a part of that time.
