= William Thompson (physician) =

Physician and Registrar General from Ireland, born 1861

Sir William Thompson
- Born: May 1861; Tattyreagh, County Tyrone, Ireland
- Died: 9 June 1929 (aged 68); Fitzwilliam Square, Dublin, Ireland
- Education: Royal College of Surgeons in Ireland
- Known for: Registrar General for Ireland
- Scientific career
- Fields: Medicine, statistics

Sir William John Thompson (May 1861 – 9 June 1929) was a physician who became Registrar General for Ireland from 1909 to 1926.

== Life ==
He was born in Tattyreagh, County Tyrone to farmer William Thompson, in May 1861. He was educated at Enniskillen, at Trinity College Dublin and at the Royal College of Surgeons in Ireland, Dublin. He graduated MD in 1895 and became a Fellow of the Royal College of Physicians in Ireland in 1902. Thompson married Mary Louise (née Wilson) on 9 September 1891. On 9 June 1929, he died in this home, 59 Fitzwilliam Square, Dublin.

== Career ==
Thompson was appointed house physician in St Vincent's Hospital, Dublin in 1895. He was elected demonstrator of anatomy at the RCSI, and later was appointed visiting and then senior physician to Jervis Street Hospital. Whilst serving as the physician-in-ordinary to the Lord Lieutenant of Ireland, Thompson became involved in the Women's National Health Association of Ireland, an initiative of Lady Aberdeen. Thompson was knighted in 1907 for services to medicine.

Throughout his career Thompson paid particular attention to infantile diseases and tuberculosis, serving as a member of the committee for the 1907 Tuberculosis Exhibition. The resulting lecture, Home treatment and nursing of pulmonary tuberculosis in Dublin, was included in the second volume of three of Ireland's Crusade Against Tuberculosis (1908-1909), published by Lady Aberdeen.

He became Registrar General for Ireland in 1909 and served until 1926. Thompson was in this office during the Spanish flu epidemic, and noted that the Irish deaths attributed to it were conservative. He was appointed Chairman of Census Commission in 1911, overseeing the first census of the Irish Free State in 1926. He served as the 26th president of the Statistical and Social Inquiry Society of Ireland from 1918 to 1920.

Thereafter held a large number of other positions, dealing both with medicine and statistics.

== References and sources ==
Notes

Sources

- Fleetwood, John F (1983). The History of Medicine in Ireland. Dublin: Skellig Press.
