= Dunnamore =

Coordinates: 54.672240°N 6.946090°W

Dunnamore: Irish: Domhnach Mór
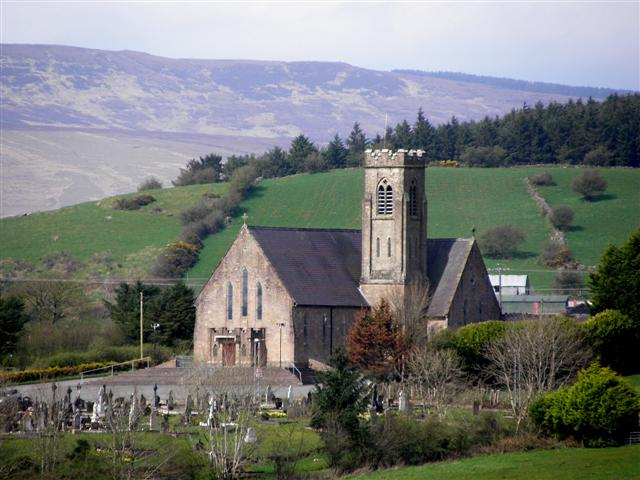
- Dunnamore Catholic church

- Location within Northern Ireland
- Population: 119 (2011 census)
- District: Mid Ulster
- County: County Tyrone
- Country: Northern Ireland
- Sovereign state: United Kingdom
- Post town: DUNNAMORE
- Postcode district: BT80
- Dialling code: 028
- UK Parliament: Mid Ulster
- NI Assembly: Mid Ulster

Dunnamore, formerly spelt Donamore (from Irish Domhnach Mór, meaning 'great church'), is a village and townland in County Tyrone, Northern Ireland.

Dunnamore is near the main A505 road between Omagh and Cookstown. It is in the Mid Ulster District Council area (and before 2015 was under Cookstown District Council).

== History ==
There are many ancient archaeological sites near the village. These included a Neolithic/Bronze Age wedge tomb, Dunnamore wedge tomb (de:Wedge Tomb von Dunnamore), known colloquially as "Dermot and Grania's Bed" and Beaghmore stone circle.

A novel entitled Traveller written by John Heagney is based in part on his father's emigration from Dunnamore to Canada as an indentured servant in the 1930s.
