= Aghyaran =

Coordinates: 54.679698°N 7.707658°W

- Hamlet
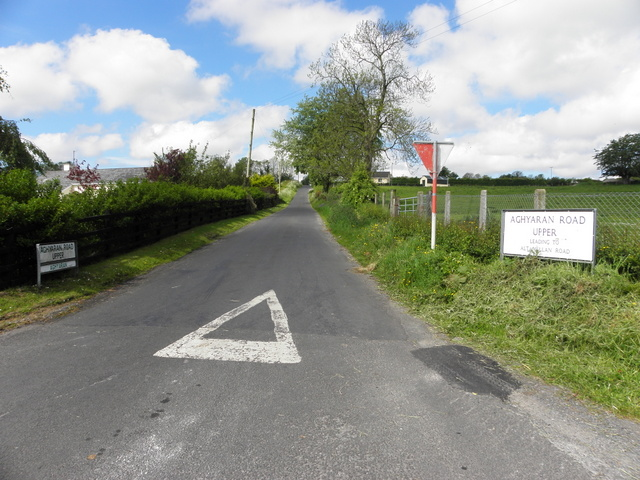
- Aghyaran Road Upper sign

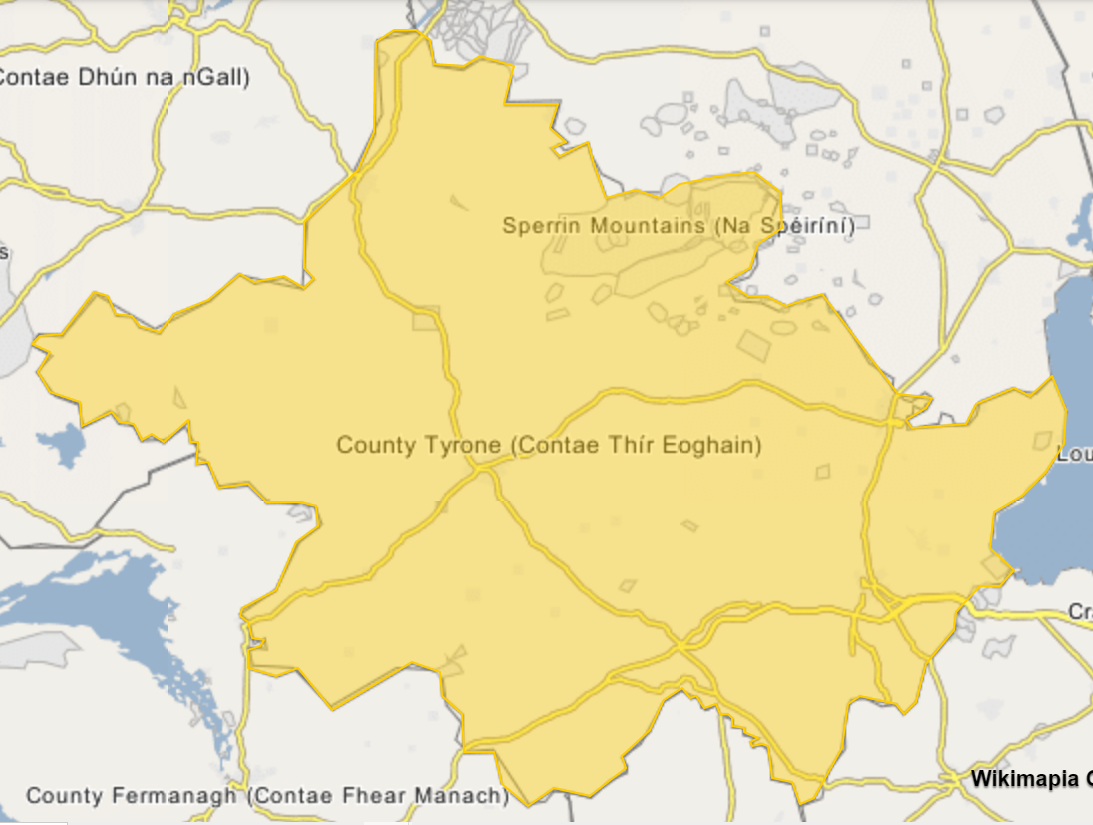
- Location within Northern Ireland
- District: Derry City and Strabane
- County: County Tyrone
- Country: Northern Ireland
- Sovereign state: United Kingdom
- Post town: CASTLEDERG
- Postcode district: BT
- Police: Northern Ireland
- Fire: Northern Ireland
- Ambulance: Northern Ireland
- UK Parliament: West Tyrone
- NI Assembly: West Tyrone

Aghyaran is a hamlet in County Tyrone, Northern Ireland.

== Religion ==
- Saint Patrick's, Aghyaran

== Sports ==
- Aghyaran St Davog's GAC

== Notable people ==
- Conor Bradley

== See also ==
- List of places in County Tyrone
- List of towns and villages in Northern Ireland
