= Drumragh, County Tyrone =

Civil parish and townland in Northern Ireland

- civil parish and townland
- Coordinates: 54.571°N 7.2936°W

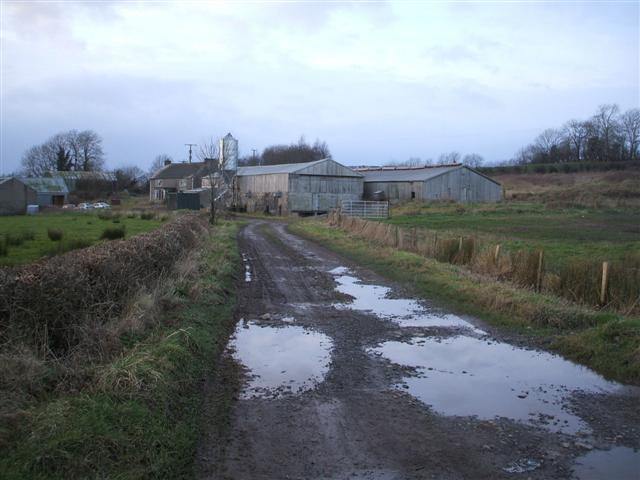
Rural lane in Drumragh

Drumragh is a civil parish and townland in County Tyrone, Northern Ireland, on the right bank of the River Drumragh. Today, it is within the county town of Omagh. It has a Roman Catholic church; and a Church of Ireland one.
