= South West College =

Further education college in Northern Ireland

South West Regional College
- Established: 2007
- Principal: Celine McCartan (as of 2024)
- Faculty: ~570 (as of 2024)
- Students: ~19,000 (as of 2023)
- Location: Cookstown, Dungannon, Enniskillen and Omagh, Northern Ireland
- Website: www.swc.ac.uk

South West College is a regional further education college in Northern Ireland that operates on four campuses in Cookstown, Dungannon, Enniskillen and Omagh. Formed in 2007, following a merger of a number of former regional colleges of further and higher education, it has campuses in County Tyrone and County Fermanagh. As of 2008, the college had an enrolment of 12,078 students (of which 1,695 were full-time and 10,383 part-time). By 2023, South West College had approximately 19,000 students enrolled.

== Campuses ==
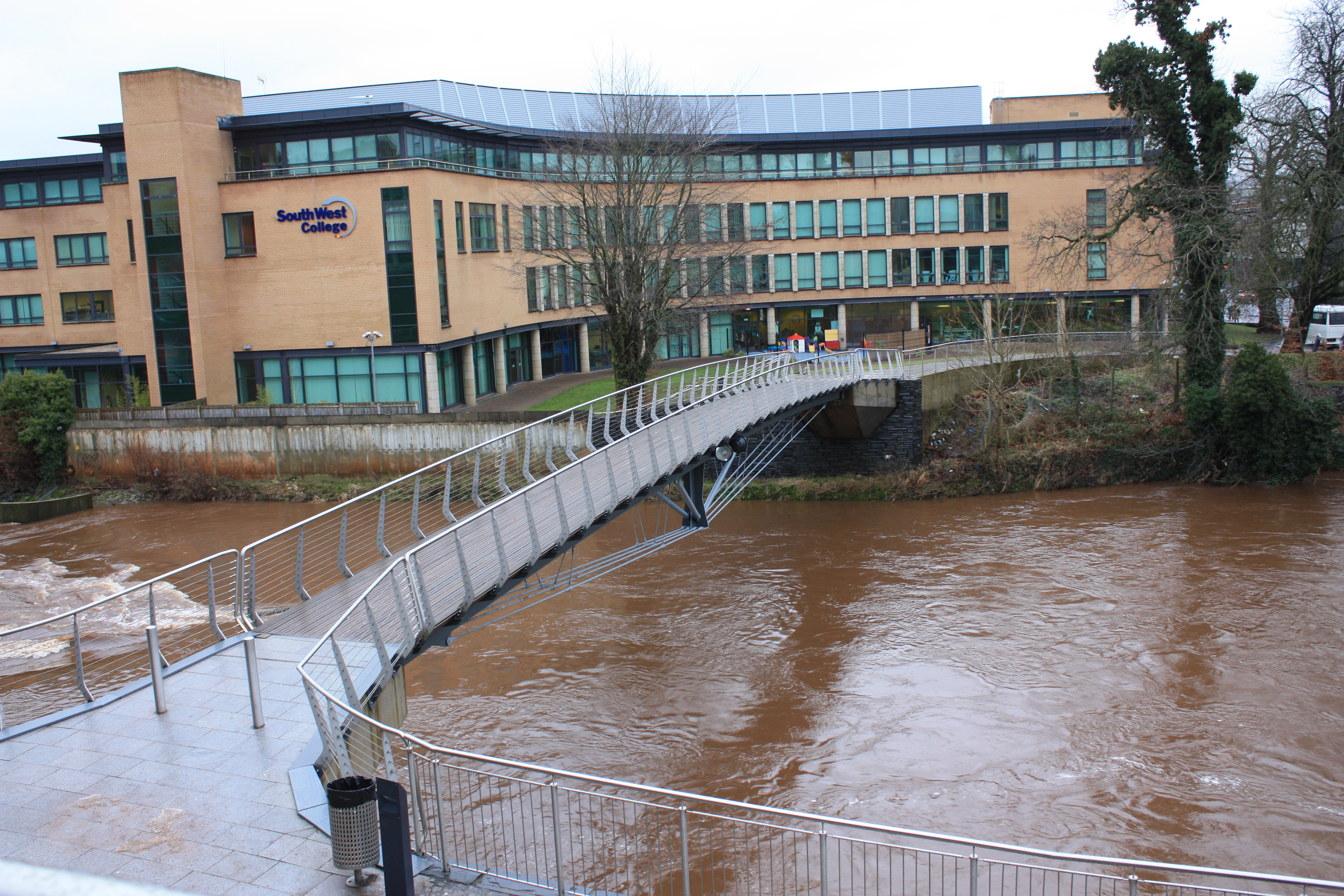
South West College campus (near the River Strule) in Omagh

The college has four campuses. These are located in Cookstown, Dungannon and Omagh in County Tyrone, and Enniskillen in County Fermanagh.

Prior to the creation of South West College in 2007, via a merger, these campuses operated as separate colleges of further education and higher education. The Omagh campus, for example, was formerly known as the Omagh College of Further Education.

The college's Erne campus in Enniskillen, on the site of the former Erne Hospital, opened in 2021. This campus won an award, for standards in "environmental construction", in 2022. In 2025, the Health and Safety Executive for Northern Ireland (HSENI) stated that it was conducting "ongoing enquiries" at the building amid complaints of staff and student sickness due to alleged air quality issues. The former campus, at Fairview in Enniskillen, was offered for sale in 2022.
