= Tonnagh Beg =

Townland in County Tyrone, Northern Ireland

Tonnagh Beg is a townland in County Tyrone, Northern Ireland. It is situated in the barony of Clogher and the civil parish of Donacavey and covers an area of 227 acres.

The name derives from the Irish: Tamhnach beag (Little green field or little field).

In 1841 the population of the townland was 101 people (21 houses) and in 1851 it was 76 people (12 houses).

The townland contains Tonnagh Beg bog, a 55.6-hectare (137-acre) designated Area of Special Scientific Interest (ASSI). It is a large lowland raised bog, among the best examples in the west of Northern Ireland.

== See also ==
- List of townlands of County Tyrone
