= Camowen River =

Coordinates: 54.563476°N 6.960156°W

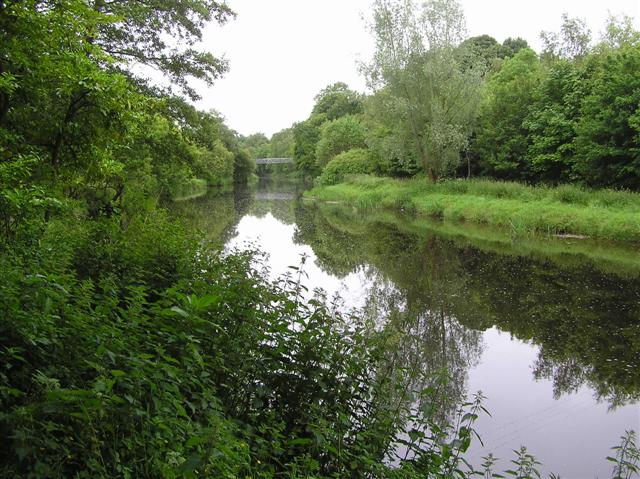
- Camowen River, with Sandra Jones Bridge (Mullaghmore) in distance
- Etymology: Irish for "crooked river"
- Native name: An Chamabhainn (Irish)

Location
- Country: Northern Ireland
- City: Omagh

Physical characteristics
- Source
  - location: South of Pomeroy, County Tyrone
- Mouth
  - location: North Channel via River Strule, River Foyle, Lough Foyle
- Length: 45 km (28 mi)
- Basin size: 276.6 km^{2} (106.8 sq mi)
- Discharge
  - average: 6.78 m^{3}/s (239 cu ft/s)

Basin features
- River system: Foyle

The Camowen River (Irish: An Chamabhainn) is a river in County Tyrone, Northern Ireland, a tributary of the River Foyle.

== Course ==
The Camowen River rises south of Pomeroy and flows westward, being bridged by the B46 in Tiroony and meeting a tributary south of Carrickmore. It meets another tributary near Bracky, then flows southwestwards under the B158. It turns northwards into Omagh, passing behind Tyrone County Hospital and meeting the River Drumragh at the centre of the town. From this point on it is called the River Strule.

== Wildlife ==
The Camowen River is a salmon fishery.

== See also ==
- Rivers of Ireland
