= West Tyrone =

West Tyrone may refer to:

- The western part of County Tyrone
- West Tyrone (Assembly constituency), a constituency in the Northern Ireland Assembly, created in 1996
- West Tyrone (Northern Ireland Parliament constituency), a county constituency from 1929–1972
- West Tyrone (UK Parliament constituency), a county constituency in Northern Ireland, created in 1997
