= Killyman =

Coordinates: 54.490°N 6.704°W

Killyman: Irish: Cill na mBan
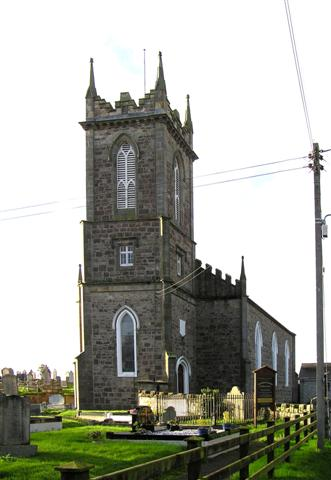
- St Andrew's Church (Church of Ireland), Killyman

- Location within Northern Ireland
- County: County Tyrone
- Country: Northern Ireland
- Sovereign state: United Kingdom
- Postcode district: BT71
- Dialling code: 028

Killyman (from Irish Cill na mBan, meaning 'church of the women') is a small village and a civil parish in Northern Ireland, situated on the eastern boundary of County Tyrone and extending into County Armagh. The majority of townlands are in the historic barony of Dungannon Middle in County Tyrone, the rest being in the barony of Oneilland West in County Armagh.

It contains the small, predominantly Protestant, settlement of Killyman proper, which lies some 4 km (2.5 mi) southeast of Dungannon and immediately south of the M1 motorway, in the townland of Laghey. The settlement, which developed around a crossroads on the road from Belfast to Dungannon, consists mainly of a number of single dwellings, although there has also been some in-depth housing development in recent years. Local facilities include a small number of shops, primary schools and churches. Mortimer O'Sullivan was the Church of Ireland rector here in the 1830s.

== Amenities and sport ==
Local schools include Killyman Primary School and Laghey Primary School.

Killyman St. Mary's is the local Gaelic Athletic Association (GAA) club.

== Civil parish of Killyman ==
The civil parish spans the villages of Killyman and Tamnamore. The civil parish also contains the following townlands:

- Annaghbeg
- Ballynakilly
- Bernagh
- Bogbane
- Bovean
- Cavan
- Clonmore
- Clontyclay
- Coash
- Cohannan
- Corr
- Corrainy
- Culnagrew
- Derrycorry North
- Derrycorry South
- Derrygally
- Derrygally Demesne
- Derryhirk
- Derryhubbert East
- Derryhubbert North
- Derryhubbert South
- Derrymeen
- Dreemore
- Drumard Cross
- Drumard Glebe
- Drumaspil
- Drumcrow
- Drumenagh
- Drumhorrik
- Drumkee
- Drummuck
- Dungorman
- Gortrea
- Gortshalgan
- Keenaghan
- Kinego
- Laghey
- Lederg
- Lisnahoy
- Lowertown
- Moyroe
- Mullaghteige
- Mullenakill North
- Mullenakill South
- Mullenakill West
- Tamlaghtmore
- Tartlaghan
- Tempanroe
- True

== Notable people ==
- Fra Fee, actor and singer

== See also ==
- List of towns and villages in Northern Ireland
- List of civil parishes of County Armagh
- List of civil parishes of County Tyrone
