= Liscloon =

Settlement in County Tyrone, Northern Ireland

Coordinates: 54.884°N 7.260°W

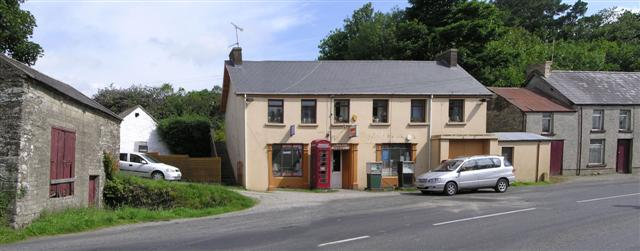
Liscloon post office

Liscloon is a settlement in County Tyrone, Northern Ireland. It is situated 2 miles from Donemana and 7 miles from Claudy. The area is sparsely populated although around 80 people reside in Liscloon. Altnachree Castle, also known as Liscloon House and Ogilby's Castle, still stands in Liscloon today. It was built in 1860 by William Ogilby.

Liscloon is divided into two townlands, Liscloon Lower and Liscloon Upper.
