= Tonnagh More =

Townland in County Tyrone, Northern Ireland

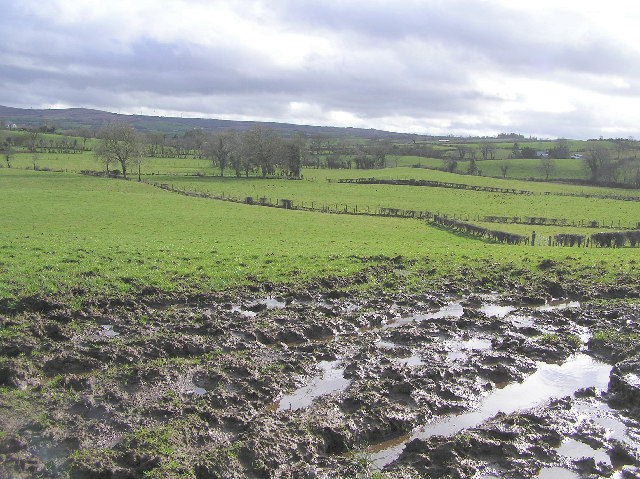
Tonnagh More townland in 2006

Tonnagh More is a townland in County Tyrone, Northern Ireland. It is situated in the barony of Omagh East and the civil parish of Donacavey and covers an area of 317 acres.

The name derives from the Irish: Tamhnach mor (Large green field or great field).

In 1841 the population of the townland was 116 people (20 houses) and in 1851 it was 115 people (21 houses).

The townland contains one Scheduled Historic Monument: a Rath (grid ref: H4020 5967).

== See also ==
- List of townlands of County Tyrone
- List of archaeological sites in County Tyrone
