= Drumkee =

Townland in County Tyrone, Northern Ireland

Coordinates: 54.510°N 6.675°W

Drumkee: Irish: Druim Ceath
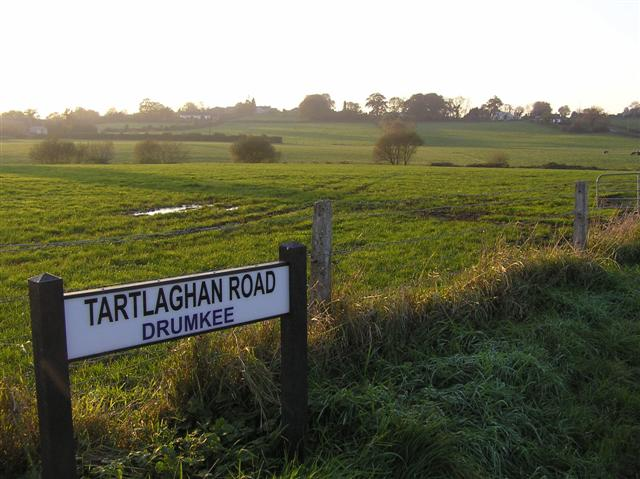
- Drumkee townland in 2006

- Location within Northern Ireland
- County: County Tyrone
- Country: Northern Ireland
- Sovereign state: United Kingdom
- Postcode district: BT71
- Dialling code: 028

Drumkee is a townland in the southeast of County Tyrone, Northern Ireland. It is directly south of the area currently known as Coalisland and east, and slightly north, of Dungannon. It is situated in the historic barony of Dungannon Middle and the civil parish of Killyman and covers an area of 285 acres. The barony's tax records dated 1666 list two families living in Drumkee.

The name derives from the Irish: Druim Chaoich (Ridge of the Blind Man) or Druim Ceath (ridge of western aspect).

== Population ==
The population of the townland declined during the 19th century:

Year	1841	1851	1861	1871	1881	1891
Population	350	184	168	145	127	111
Houses	70	39	38	31	29	28

Drumkee presently has a population of around 150, and many of its inhabitants are relations. Surnames which appear on the 1666 list include McRory and Condson. By the mid-19th century, the name Hunter appears in Drumkee burial records. The surname Mullan appears in a 1910 directory of the area.

== See also ==
- List of townlands of County Tyrone
