= Donacavey =

Townland and parish in Northern Ireland

Donacavey (from Irish Domhnach Cabha, meaning 'church of the slope or hollow'), sometimes spelt Donaghcavey, is a townland, civil parish and ecclesiastical parish in County Tyrone, Northern Ireland. The civil parish is split between the historic baronies of Clogher and Omagh East, with the townland in the Clogher barony.

The civil parish contains the village of Fintona.

== Townlands ==
There are 89 townlands in the civil parish of Donacavey.

=== A ===
Aghadreenan, Aghafad, Agharonan, Annaghbo, Annaghmurnin, Ardatinny & Attaghmore

=== B ===
Baronagh, Belnagarnan, Blackfort

=== C ===
Carnalea, Carnarousk, Carryglass, Castletown, Cattor, Cavan, Corbally, Corrashesk, Cranny, Crocknafarbrague & Cumber

=== D ===
Derrybard, Donacavey, Draughton, Drumlagher, Drummond, Drumwhisker, Dundivin Glebe, Dungoran, Dunnamona & Dunnamona Glebe

=== E ===
Ecclesville Demesne, Edenafogry, Edenasop East, Edenasop West & Edenatoodry

=== F ===
Fallaghearn, Feenan, Fintona & Freughmore

=== G ===
Gargrim, Garvallagh, Glennan & Gulladoo

=== K ===
Kilcootry, Kilgort, Killyberry, Killyliss & Killymoonan

=== L ===
Lackagh, Legamaghery, Legatiggle, Lisavaddy, Lisconrea, Lisdergan, Lisky, Lisnabulrevey, Lisnacreeve, Lisnagardy & Lurganboy

=== M ===
Mullanboy, Mullans, Mullasiloga & Mullawinny

=== R ===
Racrane, Raneese, Rathfraggan, Rathwarren, Raveagh & Roughan

=== S ===
Screggagh, Sessiagh, Skelgagh, Skreen, Strabane, Stranisk, Stratigore, Syonee & Syonfin

=== T ===
Tattymoyle Lower, Tattymoyle Middle, Tattymoyle Upper, Tattymulmona, Tireenan, Tonnagh Beg, Tonnagh More, Tonnaghbane, Tullyrush & Tullyvally

== Ecclesiastical ==
Donacavey is also an ecclesiastical parish in the Church of Ireland and Catholic churches.

=== Catholic ===
The parish of Donacavey is part of the Clogher Diocese in the Catholic Church in Ireland. The Catholic parish boundaries are the same as that of the civil parish. The parish church is called St. Lawrence's which is located off the Lisdergan Road in the Ecclesville Demesne townland.

=== Church of Ireland ===
The parish of Donacavey is part of the Clogher Diocese in the Church of Ireland. Unlike its Catholic counterpart, the Church of Ireland parish of Donacavey only covers a part of the civil parish of Donacavey; the south western portion of the civil parish is a separate Church of Ireland parish called Barr. However both Church of Ireland parishes together make up the same boundaries as the civil parish of Donacavey and today are administrated by one rector as the parish of "Donacavey and Barr" whilst retaining separate (parish) churches.

== See also ==
- List of civil parishes of County Tyrone
- List of townlands of County Tyrone
