= Seskinore =

Coordinates: 54.51754°N 7.25407°W

Seskinore: Irish: Seisceann Mhór
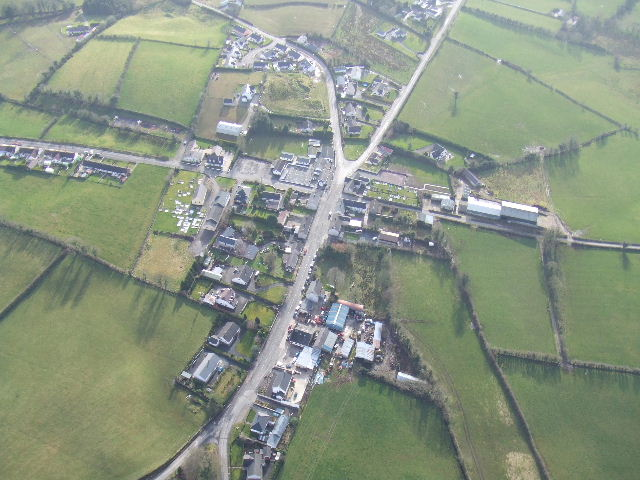

- Location within Northern Ireland
- Population: 358 (2021 census)
- Irish grid reference: H483635
  - Belfast: 85 km (53 mi)
- District: Fermanagh and Omagh
- County: County Tyrone
- Country: Northern Ireland
- Sovereign state: United Kingdom
- Post town: OMAGH
- Postcode district: BT78
- Dialling code: 028, +44 28
- UK Parliament: West Tyrone
- NI Assembly: West Tyrone

Seskinore or Seskanore (from Irish Seisceann Mhór, meaning 'big marsh/bog') is a small village and townland in County Tyrone, Northern Ireland. It is 4 kilometres (2.5 mi) northeast of Fintona and 9 kilometres (5.6 mi) southeast of Omagh. The village had a population of 358 in the 2021 census.

== Geography ==
The name Seskinore is derived from the Irish Seisceann Mhór, which means "big marsh/bog", and the area to the north on the way to Omagh is characterised by lowland raised bog. Pike's Province of Ulster (1909) described the area thus: "The country is undulating with bogs in parts which make hunting difficult".

Seskinore Forest, 1 mile (1.6 km) north of the village, is a mixed broadleaf and coniferous woodland which dates from at least 1833.

== History ==
Little is known about the origins of the village but there is proof that it existed in the early part of the 17th century when at least two of its inhabitants were listed as paying Hearth Tax.

Following the marriage of Mary Perry to Alexander McClintock in 1781, the village became the family seat of the McClintock family, who had settled in Ulster in 1597 from Argyll, Scotland. The McClintock family were enthusiastic huntsmen and in 1860 they established the "Tyrone Hunt", which was renamed the "Seskinore Hunt" in 1886.

== Schools ==
The village has one primary school, McClintock Primary School, which is at the south end of the Main Street on land donated by Lt. Col. John Knox McClintock. Building of the school began in 1900 and it opened in 1902. It was originally known as Seskinore No.2 National School as there was also at one time a Chapel School.

== Churches ==
Even though it is a small village, Seskinore has three churches:

- Seskinore Parish Church (Church of Ireland) also known as the Chapel of Ease

Previously a school house on the McClintock Estate, situated at the junction of the Beragh and Omagh Roads, served as a place of worship for members of the Church of Ireland in the Seskinore area for the greater part of the 19th Century. In 1890 the McClintock family build the present Chapel of Ease. The church has a fine picturesque woodland setting and was built as a Chapel of Ease to the Parish Church at Clogherny.

- Seskinore Presbyterian Church

The church holds the distinction of being the oldest religious edifice in the village having been built c. 1827. The congregation here was called Newtownparry after the original name of the village. The General Assembly in 1898 granted a request that the name be changed to Seskinore Presbyterian Church.

- St. Malachy's Church (Catholic)

The Catholic Church in the village was originally a dwelling house which was purchased, in 1839, by the Catholic Community and was enlarged and fitted out as a place of worship. Extensive repairs were carried out c.1906 and it has remained substantially unchanged since.

== Notable people ==
- Rose Kavanagh from Killadroy - Editor, writer, poet; Uncle Remus in The Irish Fireside Club (Freeman's Journal); part of the Gaelic Revival and the Irish Literary Revival
