= River Drumragh =

River in Northern Ireland

Coordinates: 54.59852°N 7.29286°W

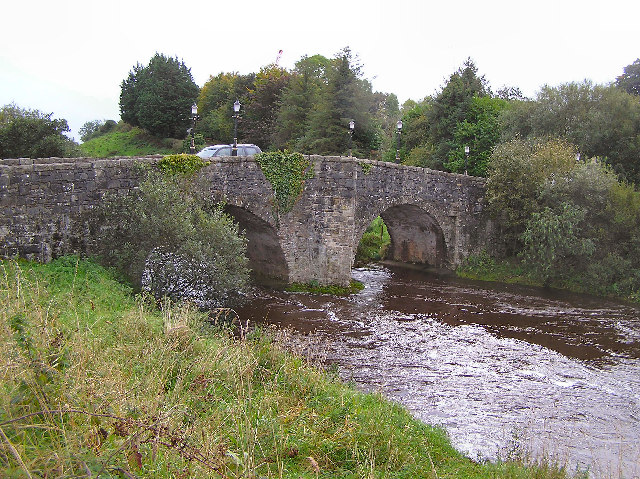
River Drumragh at St James' Bridge

The River Drumragh runs through Omagh, the county town of County Tyrone in Northern Ireland.

A small river known as the Quiggery Water flows through Fintona, with bridges crossing it at Kiln Street and Mill Street. This river then joins with the Ballynahatty Water to form the Drumragh River. Omagh is sited at the confluence of the Camowen, Strule and Drumragh Rivers. The Camowen and Drumragh Rivers actually meet at Omagh to form the River Strule. In 2006 a new Omagh Throughpass road scheme, developed at a cost of £9.7m, was opened. The project included a river bridge to carry the Throughpass over the Drumragh River.

== Angling ==
The River Drumragh has excellent trout fishing over its entire length.
