= Kildress =

Village near Cookstown, Northern Ireland

Kildress Cill Dreasa
- Village / civil parish
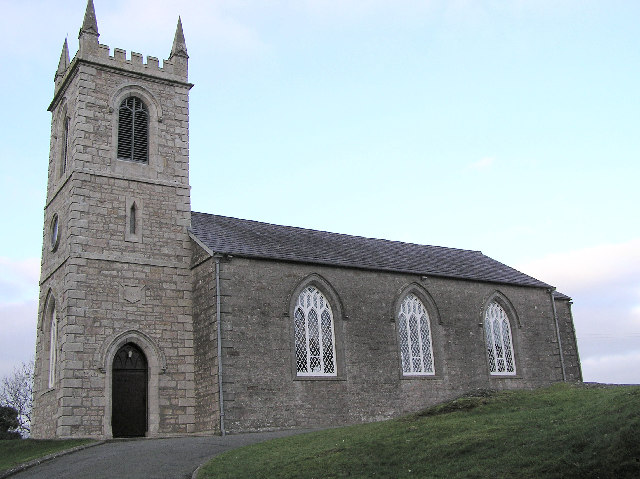
- St Patrick's Church of Ireland, Kildress
- Interactive map of Kildress
- Coordinates: 54.651°N 6.856°W

Kildress (from Irish Cill Dreasa 'church of the brambles') is a village and civil parish on the outskirts of Cookstown in County Tyrone, Northern Ireland.

There are two churches in the area. One is St. Patrick's Church of Ireland and the other is St. Joseph's Catholic Church, Killeenan. St. Patrick's Church was built in 1818. The present St. Joseph's Church was built in 1996. It replaced an earlier church that was built in 1855. The local primary school is St. Joseph's Primary School.

Nearby is Drum Manor Forest Park and Wellbrook Beetling Mill.

It is home to Cloughfin Pipe Band which was formed in 1926. The band has been an integral part of the parish ever since and you will be hard pressed to find anyone who lives there who either has had a family member who has played or been involved in the band or knows someone who has. Cloughfin pipe band historically practiced in Cloughfin hall which was originally a blacksmiths forge hence their logo - an anvil which represents that historic link as well as strength and fortitude. The band continues to be an integral part of the local community to this day playing both at local events and at RSPBA competitions coming forth in the World Pipe band championships in Glasgow in 2023 in grade 4A - since then they have been promoted to grade 3B and continue to be ambassadors for Kildress parish. Kildress Wolfe Tones GAA club.

== See also ==
- List of civil parishes of County Tyrone
