= River Strule =

River in County Tyrone, Northern Ireland

Coordinates: 54°44′16″N 7°25′48″W

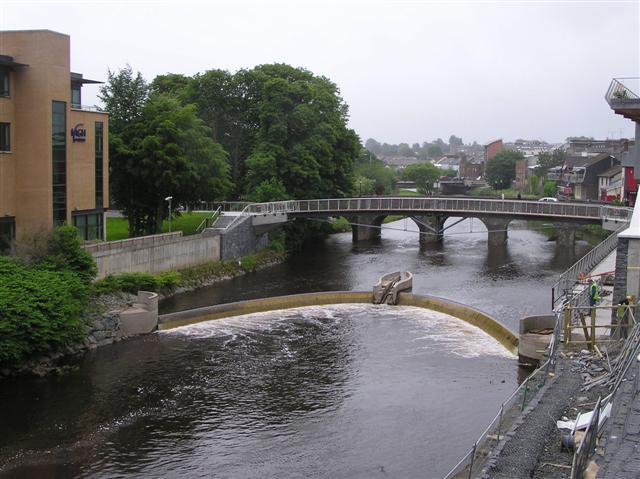
Fishcounter in the River Strule at Omagh.

The River Strule (Irish: An tSruthail) is a small river in County Tyrone, Northern Ireland. The river has its source in the confluence of the rivers Camowen and Drumragh at Omagh. The Strule runs to north and meets the rivers Fairy Water and Owenkillew before joining the River Derg and forming the River Mourne.
