= Killyclogher =

- Village
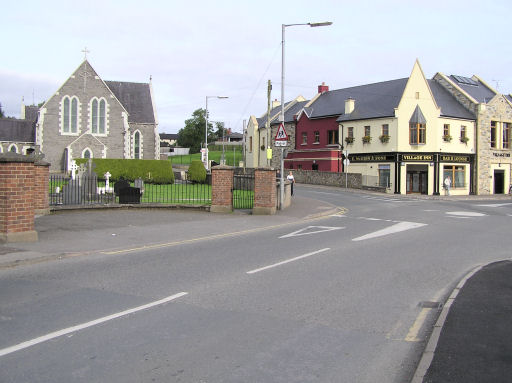

- Location within Northern Ireland
- Coordinates: 54.61°N 7.26°W

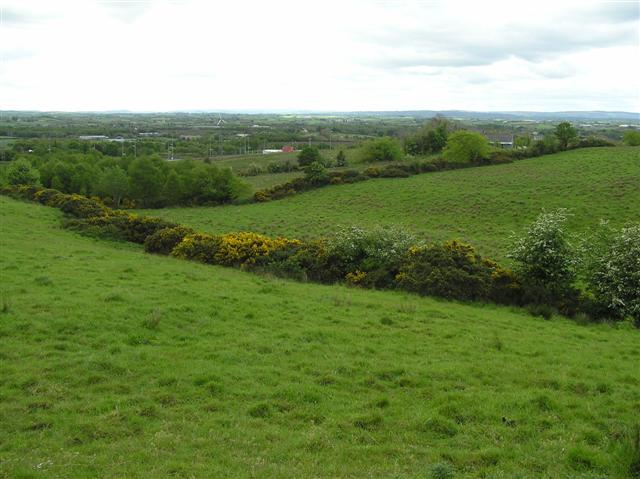
Killyclogher, looking towards Omagh

Killyclogher (from Irish Coill an Chlochair 'rocky forest') is a village on the outskirts of the town of Omagh, County Tyrone, Northern Ireland. It is also a townland and an electoral ward of Fermanagh and Omagh District Council. At the 2011 census, Killyclogher Ward had a population of 3096.

== Boundaries ==
Due to urban sprawl in the 1990s, Killyclogher is often recognised as being inside Omagh town boundaries, Killyclogher residents take great pride in their own parochial identity separate from neighbouring Drumragh Parish (Omagh Town).

This has led to much debate between the residents of the greater Omagh area as to where Omagh ends and Killyclogher begins. In the West Tyrone Area Plan (published 10 January 2006), this was said on the issue:

"Participants highlighted the need to maintain the identity of Omagh as an entity conjoined with Killyclogher. Appreciation was expressed when the village identity has been submerged in the urban sprawl of Omagh. It was pointed out that Killyclogher, which, according to the 2001 census has a population approaching 3000 people is not mentioned in the Issues paper - not even on the map! Also, it was proposed that the area should be designated by the WTAP (West Tyrone Area Plan) as a unionized settlement. The community has its own local community infrastructure such as a vibrant GAA club, Church, Parish hierarchy, Youth club, Community hall ande."

== GAA Club ==
Killyclogher gives its Irish name to the local Gaelic football team which is part of the GAA club of Cappagh Parish, within which Killyclogher is situated. The GAA club provides for all aspects of GAA sport and cultural activities. Dún Uladh, the regional headquarters of Comhaltas Ceoltóirí Éireann are situated in the neighbouring townland of Ballinamullan, the name given to the home of Killyclogher St Marys GAA Club. Killyclogher St. Marys won the Tyrone County Championship in 2003 and 2016, and the Senior League title in 2001, 2014, 2017 and 2020, and frequently produce players for the county.

== Notable people and events ==
- Brian Friel
- Murder of Ronan Kerr
