= Omagh =

County town of County Tyrone, Northern Ireland

Coordinates: 54.598°N 7.309°W

Omagh: Irish: An Ómaigh; Scots: Omey
- County town
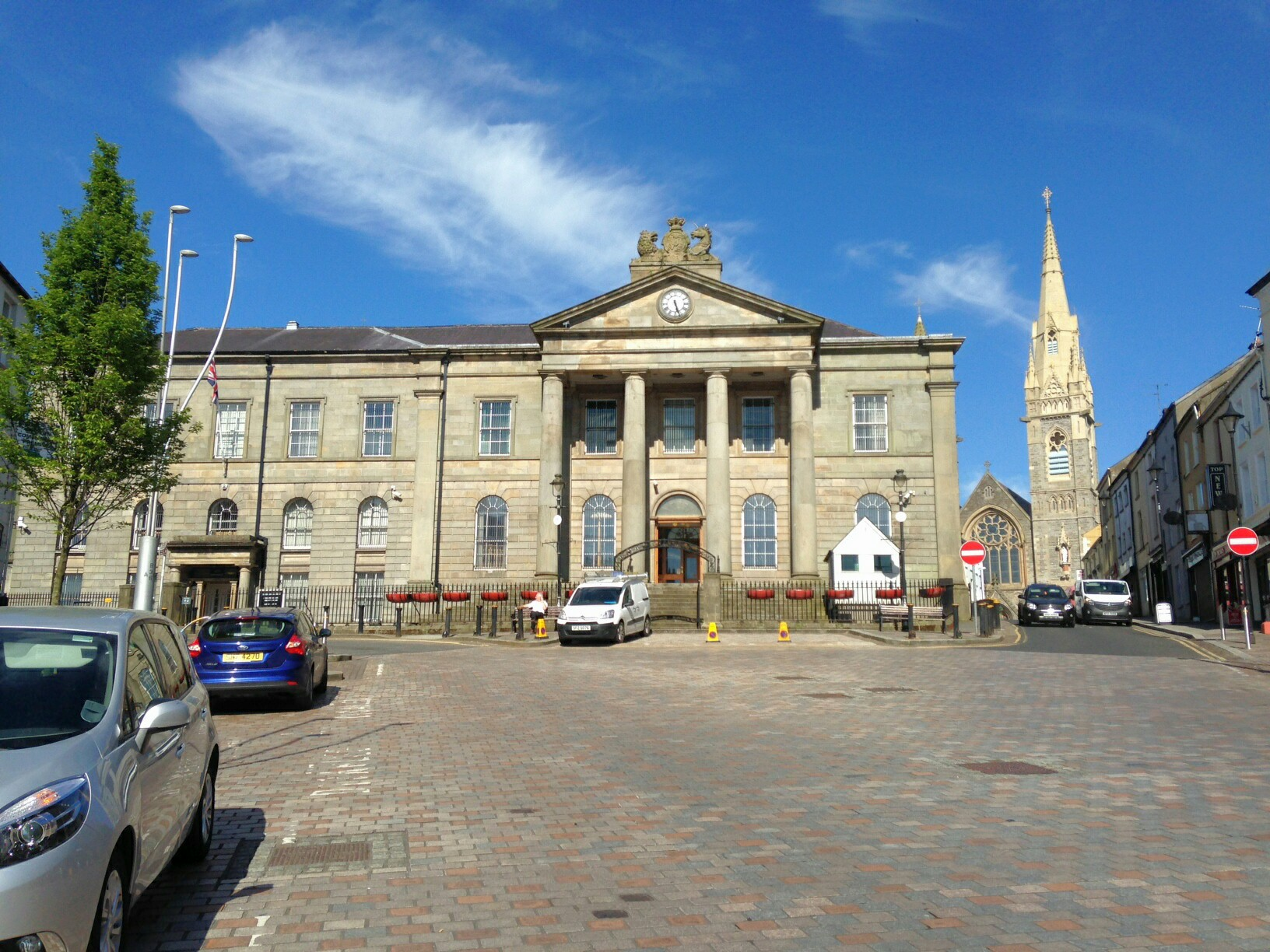
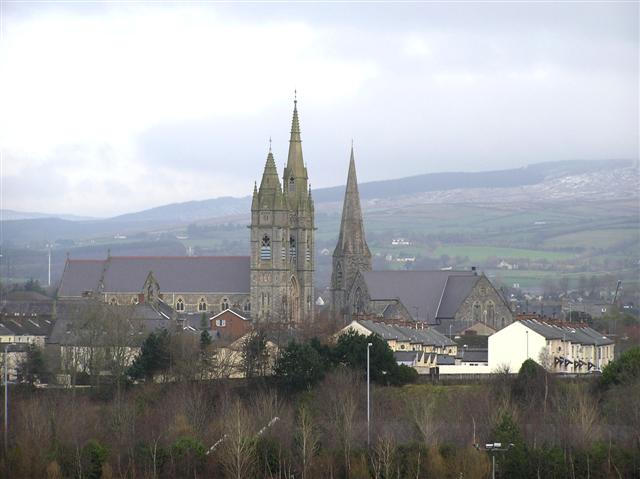
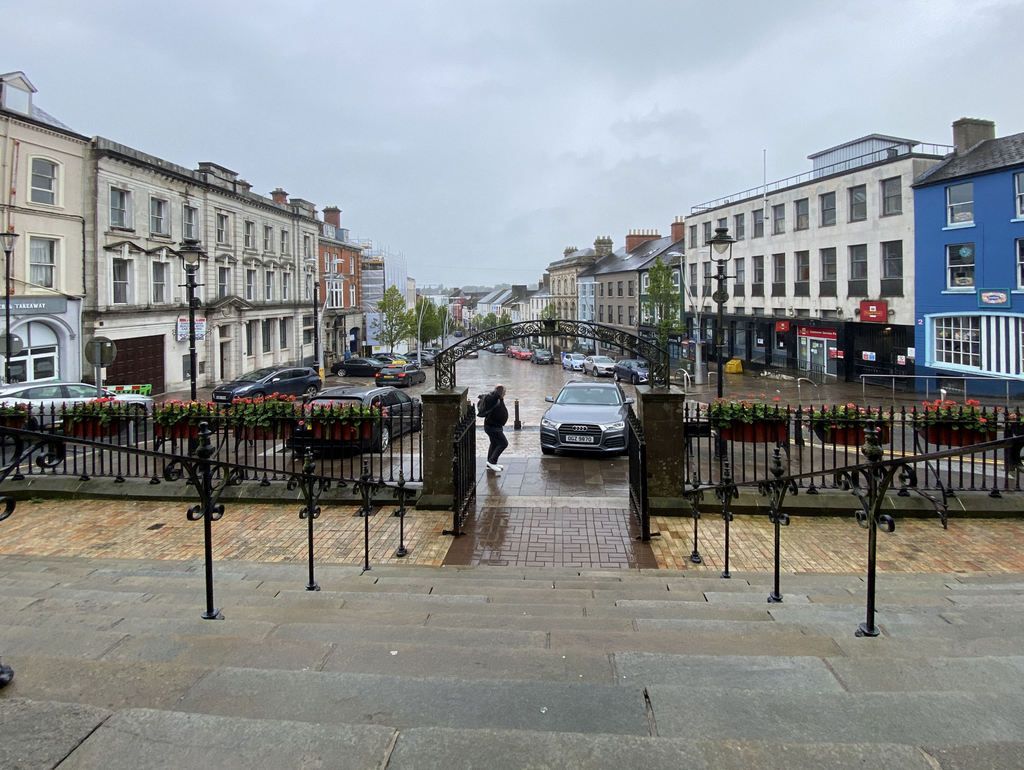
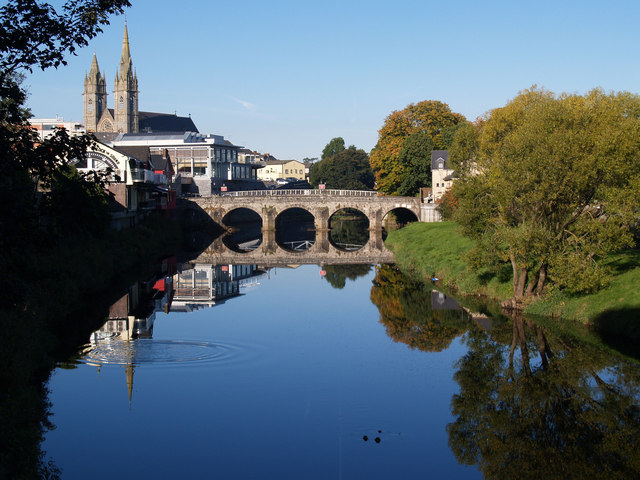
- From top, left to right: Omagh Courthouse and main square; Catholic and Anglican church spires; High Street; River Strule

- Omagh Coat of Arms

- Location within Northern Ireland
- Population: 20,458 (2021 census)
- District: Fermanagh and Omagh
- County: County Tyrone
- Country: Northern Ireland
- Sovereign state: United Kingdom
- Post town: OMAGH
- Postcode district: BT78, BT79
- Dialling code: 028
- Police: Northern Ireland
- Fire: Northern Ireland
- Ambulance: Northern Ireland
- UK Parliament: West Tyrone
- NI Assembly: West Tyrone

Omagh (/ˈoʊmə, ˈoʊmɑː/; from Irish: An Ómaigh [ənˠ ˈoːmˠiː], meaning 'the virgin plain') is the county town of County Tyrone, Northern Ireland. It is situated where the rivers Drumragh and Camowen meet to form the Strule. Northern Ireland's capital city, Belfast, is 68 miles (109.5 km) to the east of Omagh, and Derry is 34 miles (55 km) to the north.

The town had a population of 20,458 at the 2021 census. At the time of 2011 census, the former district council, which was the largest in County Tyrone, had a population of 51,356. Omagh contains the headquarters of the Western Education and Library Board, and also houses offices for the Department of Agriculture, Environment and Rural Affairs at Sperrin House, the Department for Infrastructure and the Northern Ireland Roads Service at the Tyrone County Hall and the Northern Ireland Land & Property Services at Boaz House.

== History ==
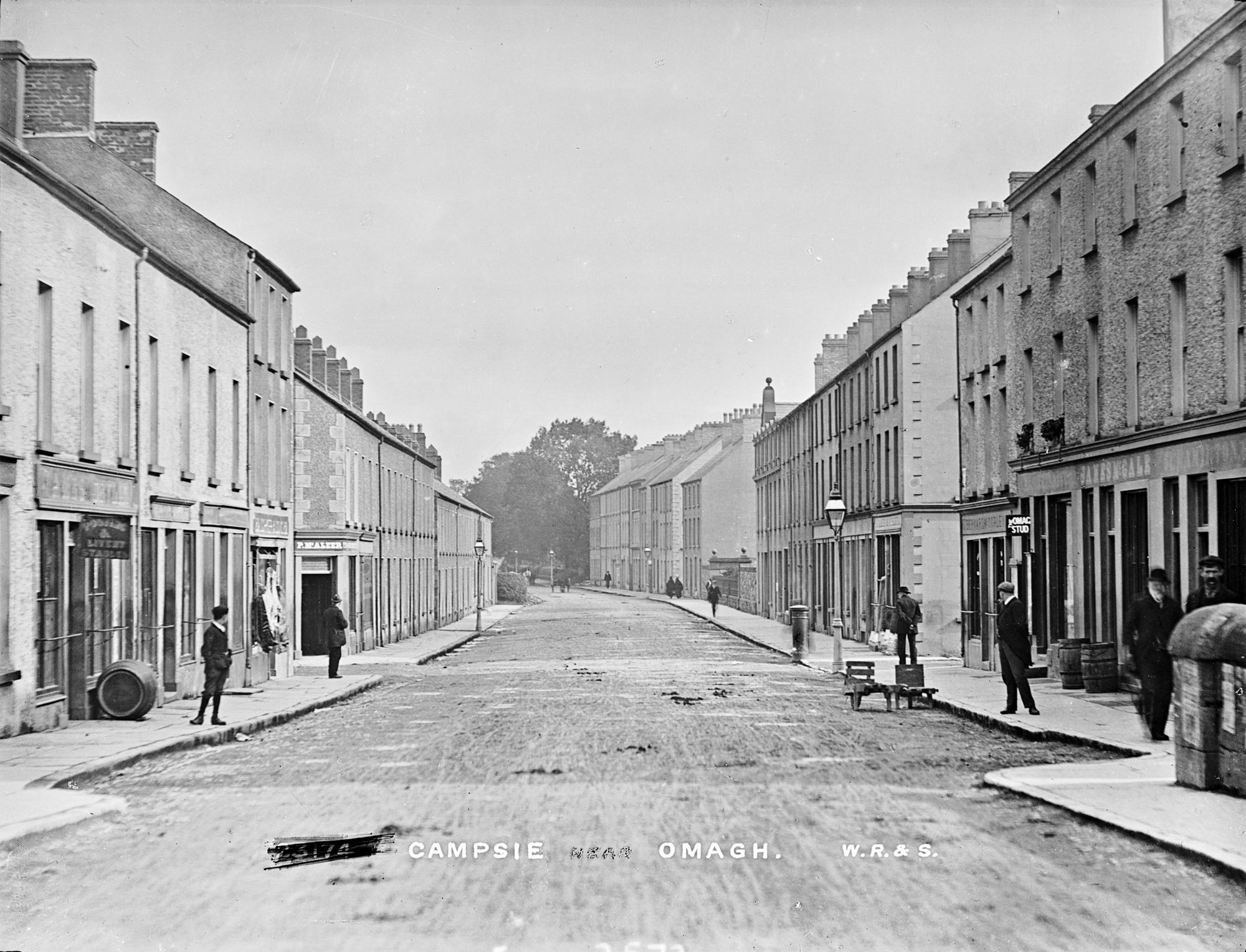
Campsie, Omagh, in the early 20th century

=== Name ===
The name Omagh is an anglicisation of the Irish name An Óghmaigh (modern Irish An Ómaigh), meaning "the virgin plain". A monastery was apparently established on the site of the town about 792, and a Franciscan friary was founded in 1464. Omagh was founded as a town in 1610. It served as a refuge for fugitives from the east of County Tyrone during the 1641 Rebellion. In 1689, James II arrived at Omagh, en route to Derry. Supporters of William III, Prince of Orange, later burned the town.

=== County Town ===
In 1768, Omagh replaced Dungannon as the county town of County Tyrone. Omagh acquired railway links to Londonderry with the Londonderry and Enniskillen Railway in 1852, Enniskillen in 1853 and Belfast in 1861. St Lucia Barracks were completed in 1881. In 1899, Tyrone County Hospital was opened. The Government of Northern Ireland made the Great Northern Railway Board close the Omagh – Enniskillen railway line in 1957. In accordance with the Benson Report submitted to the Northern Ireland Government in 1963, the Ulster Transport Authority closed the Portadown – Omagh – Londonderry main line in 1965, leaving Tyrone with no rail service. St Lucia Barracks closed in August 2007.

On 30 December 1942, a Consolidated Catalina Ib of No. 240 Squadron RAF that was operating from RAF Killadeas crashed into the town. The crash killed all eleven occupants, however no one on the ground was killed or injured. The cause of the crash was never ascertained.

Omagh Town Hall, which opened on 29 September 1915, hosted a number of notable performers, including the actors Anew McMaster, Micheál Mac Liammóir and Jimmy O'Dea, before it was demolished to make way for the Strule Arts Centre in 1997.

=== The Troubles ===
Omagh became the focus of international media attention when, on 15 August 1998, the Real Irish Republican Army exploded a car bomb in the town centre. 29 people were killed in the blast – 14 women (including one pregnant with twins), 9 children and 6 men. Hundreds more were injured as a result of the blast.

In April 2011, a car bomb killed police constable Ronan Kerr. A group of former Provisional IRA members calling itself the Irish Republican Army made its first public statement later that month claiming responsibility for the killing.

In February 2023, an off-duty senior police officer was shot and critically injured at a sports complex in the town. Police stated they were focusing on the New IRA.

== Geography ==
=== Weather ===
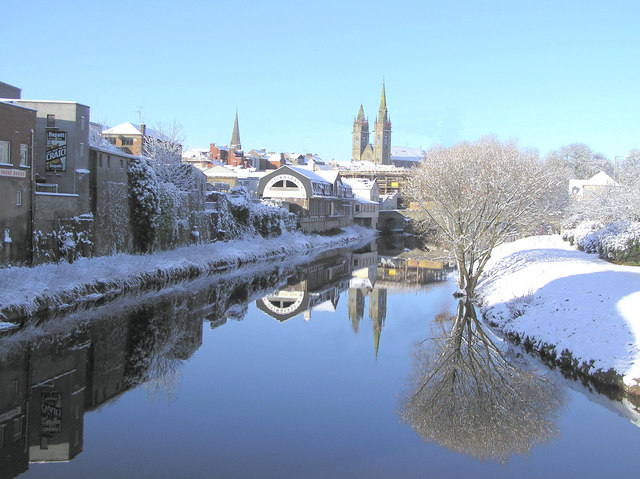
Snow is common in Omagh during the winter months. Shown here is the River Strule.

Omagh has a history of flooding and suffered major floods in 1909, 1929, 1954, 1969, 1987, 1999 and, most recently, 12 June 2007. Flood-walls have been built to keep the water in the channel (River Strule) and to prevent it from overflowing into the flood plain. Large areas of land, mainly around the meanders, are unsuitable for development and were developed into large, green open areas, walking routes and parks. The Köppen Climate Classification subtype for this climate is "Cfb" (Marine West Coast Climate/Oceanic climate).

Climate data for Omagh
Month	Jan	Feb	Mar	Apr	May	Jun	Jul	Aug	Sep	Oct	Nov	Dec	Year
Mean daily maximum °C (°F)	8 (46)	9 (48)	10 (50)	12 (54)	16 (61)	18 (64)	19 (66)	19 (66)	17 (63)	13 (55)	10 (50)	8 (46)	13 (55)
Mean daily minimum °C (°F)	2 (36)	2 (36)	3 (37)	3 (37)	6 (43)	9 (48)	11 (52)	11 (52)	9 (48)	6 (43)	4 (39)	2 (36)	6 (43)
Average precipitation mm (inches)	120 (4.7)	79 (3.1)	79 (3.1)	74 (2.9)	71 (2.8)	69 (2.7)	76 (3)	64 (2.5)	86 (3.4)	120 (4.8)	99 (3.9)	120 (4.6)	1,050 (41.4)
Source: Weatherbase

=== Wards ===
The following wards cover the town:

- Camowen (2001 population: 2,377)
- Coolnagard (2,547)
- Dergmoney (1,930)
- Drumragh (2,481)
- Gortrush (2,786)
- Killyclogher (2,945)
- Lisanelly (2,973)
- Strule (1,780)

=== Townlands ===
The central urban area south of River Strule forms the townland of Omagh in the civil parish of Drumragh, the adjacent area north of the river forms the townland of Lisnamllard in the civil parish of Cappagh (Upper Strabane portion). Both civil parishes comprise also outskirts of Omagh and some surrounding countryside. Omagh Urban Electoral Division comprises both townlands.

The town sprang up within the townland of Omagh, in the parish of Drumragh. Over time, the urban area has spread into the surrounding townlands. They include:

- Campsie (from Irish Camsan 'river bends')
- Conywarren (an old English name for a rabbit warren)
- Coolnagard Lower, Coolnagard Upper (from Irish Cúil na gCeard 'nook/corner of the craftsmen' or from Irish Cúl na gCeard 'hill-back of the craftsmen')
- Cranny from Irish Crannaigh 'wooded place'
- Culmore (from Irish Cúil Mhór 'big nook/corner')
- Dergmoney Lower, Dergmoney Upper (from Irish Deargmhuine 'red thicket')
- Gortmore (from Irish Gort Mór 'big tilled field')
- Gortrush (from Irish Gort an Rois 'field of the wood or promontory')
- Killybrack (from Irish Coillidh Bhreac 'speckled wood')
- Killyclogher (from Irish Coillidh Chlochair 'wood of the stony place')
- Lammy (from Irish Leamhaigh 'place of elms')
- Lisanelly (from Irish Lios an Ailigh 'ringfort of the stony place')
- Lisnamallard (from Irish Lios na Mallacht 'ringfort of the curse')
- Lissan (from Irish Liosán 'small ringfort')
- Mullaghmore (from Irish Mullach Mór 'big hilltop')
- Sedennan (possibly from Irish Suí Dianáin 'Dennan's seat/stronghold')
- Strathroy or Straughroy (from Irish Srath Crua 'the hard river-holm')

== Demographics ==
National Identity of Omagh residents (2021)
Nationality	Per cent
Irish	42.4%
Northern Irish	32.6%
British	24.0%

Historical population
Year	Pop.	±%
1981	14,627	—
1991	17,280	+18.1%
2001	19,910	+15.2%
2011	19,659	−1.3%
2021	20,458	+4.1%
According to the World Gazetteer, the following reflects the census data for Omagh since 1981:

=== 2021 census ===
At the time of the 2021 census, there were 20,458 people living in Omagh. Of these:

- 19.56% were aged under 16, 63.87% were aged between 16 and 65, and 16.57% were aged 66 and over.
- 51.37% of the usually resident population were female and 48.63% were male.
- 70.88% (14,500) belong to or were brought up in the Catholic, 22.91% (4,687) belong to or were brought up Protestant (including Christian denominations), 1.11% (228) belong to or were brought up in other religions and 5.1% (1,043) belong to no religion.
- 42.35% had an Irish national identity, 32.62% had a Northern Irish national identity, 24.01% had a British national identity, and 11.02% had an 'other' national identity. (respondents could indicate more than one national identity)
- 16.43% had some knowledge of Irish (Gaeilge) and 5.61% had some knowledge of Ulster Scots.

=== 2011 census ===
On census day 2011 (27 March 2011), there were 19,659 people living in Omagh, accounting for 1.09% of the NI total. Of these:

- 20.85% were aged under 16 years and 13.69% were aged 65 and over;
- 51.27% of the usually resident population were female and 48.73% were male;
- 71.32% belong to or were brought up in the Catholic Christian faith and 25.36% belong to or were brought up in a 'Protestant and other Christian (including Christian related)'denominations;
- 36.97% had an Irish national identity, 33.97% had a Northern Irish national identity and 28.51% indicated that they had a British national identity (respondents could indicate more than one national identity);
- 36 years was the average (median) age of the population;
- 13.92% had some knowledge of Irish (Gaeilge) and 4.30% had some knowledge of Ulster-Scots.

== Economy ==
=== Retail ===
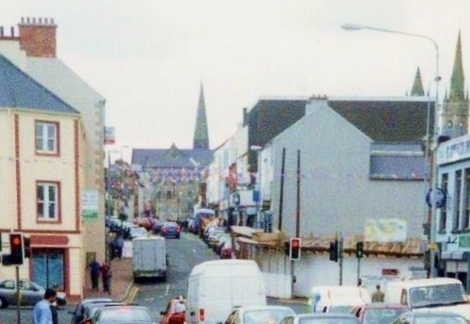
Lower Market Street

Omagh is the main retail centre for Tyrone, as well as the West of Ulster (behind Derry and Letterkenny), due to its central location. In the period 2000–2003, over £80 million was invested in Omagh, and 60,960 m^{2} (656,200 ft^{2}) of new retail space was created. Shopping areas in Omagh include the Main Street, Great Northern Road Retail Park and the Showgrounds Retail Park on Sedan Avenue in the town centre. Market Street/High Street is also a prominent shopping street, which includes high street stores such as DV8 and Primark.

=== Events and culture ===
Strule Arts Centre is an example of urban renewal in Omagh town centre. Opened in 2007, this civic building is located in a newly created public space which was reclaimed from a formerly disused area between the River Strule and High Street.

The Mid Ulster Film Festival, established in 2004, took place in Omagh until its cancellation in 2010.

=== Amenities and tourism ===
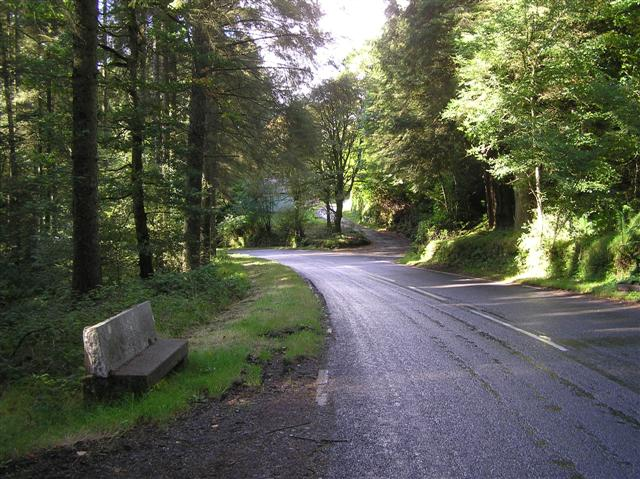
Gortin Road. Heading south-west towards Omagh; to the left is the "Rest and be thankful" bench.

The Ulster American Folk Park, near Omagh, includes the cottage where Thomas Mellon was born (in 1813) before his family emigrated to Pennsylvania in the United States. His son, Andrew W. Mellon, became secretary of the US Treasury. The park is an open-air museum that explores the journey made by the Irish (specifically those from Ulster) to America during the 1800s. The park is used to host seasonal events and also hosts a Bluegrass festival every year. Over 127,000 people visited the park in 2003.

The 'Omagh Accessible Shared Inclusive Space' (OASIS), a £4.5 million facelift for Omagh's riverbank, was funded by the European Union and planning approved in 2013. Construction began in March 2014, and the OASIS plaza was officially opened in June 2015.

Omagh has over 20 playgrounds for children, and several public green spaces. The largest of these is the Grange Park near the town centre. Several areas alongside the River Strule have also been developed into open areas. Omagh Leisure Complex is a public amenity, near Grange Park on 11 hectares (27 acres) of landscaped grounds, which has a leisure centre, boating pond, astroturf pitch and cycle paths.

== Transport ==
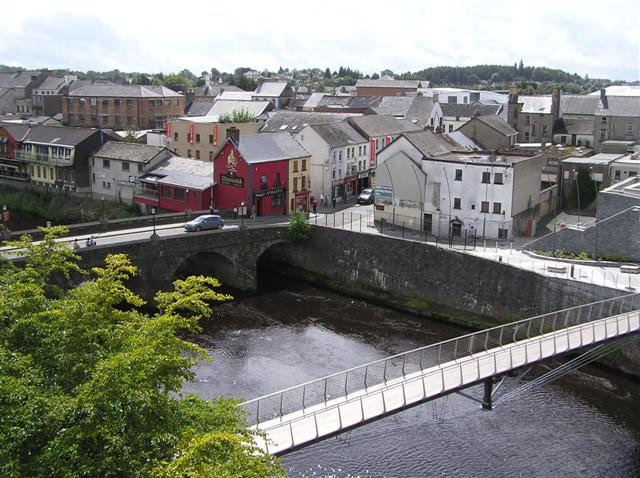
Looking at the town's Bridge Street area from an elevated height at the college

=== Former railways ===
As of the 21st century, neither the town nor the district of Omagh has any railway service.

The Irish gauge 1,600 mm (5 ft 3 in) Londonderry and Enniskillen Railway (L&ER) opened as far as Omagh on 3 September 1852 and was extended to Enniskillen in 1854. The Portadown, Dungannon and Omagh Junction Railway (PD&O) reached Omagh in 1861, completing the Portadown – Derry route that came to be informally called "The Derry Road". The Great Northern Railway (Ireland) absorbed the PD&O in 1876 and the L&ER in 1883.

The Government of Northern Ireland made the GNR Board close the Omagh – Enniskillen line in 1957. The Ulster Transport Authority took over the GNR's remaining lines in Northern Ireland in 1958. In accordance with The Benson Report submitted to the Northern Ireland Government in 1963, the UTA closed the "Derry Road" through Omagh on 15 February 1965. Later the Omagh Throughpass road was built on the disused trackbed through Omagh railway station.

As of 2014, there were plans to reopen railway lines in Northern Ireland including the Derry Road from Portadown to Derry via Dungannon to Omagh and Strabane.

=== Bus services ===
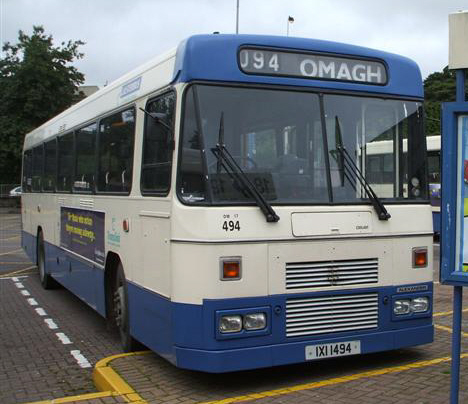
Ulsterbus in 2007 in Omagh Ulsterbus station.

Bus services in Omagh are operated by Ulsterbus.

=== Road connections ===
- A32 (Omagh – Enniskillen – Ballinamore) (Becomes N87 at border)
- A5 (Northbound) (Omagh – Strabane [and from here north-west to Letterkenny, via Lifford on the A38, becoming the N14 at the county border] – Derry)
- A5 (Southbound) (Omagh – Monaghan – Ashbourne – Dublin) (Becomes N2 at border)
- A4 (Eastbound) (Omagh – Dungannon – Belfast) (A4 joins A5 near Ballygawley)
- A505 (Eastbound) (Omagh – Cookstown)
- The Omagh Throughpass (Stage 3) opened on 18 August 2006.

== Education ==
Omagh has a number of educational institutions at different levels. These include at least 10 primary schools.

The town was previously the headquarters of the Western Education and Library Board (WELB), located at Campsie House on the Hospital Road, before all local education boards in Northern Ireland were combined into the Education Authority in 2015.

=== Secondary schools ===
Grammar and secondary schools in the area include Christian Brothers Grammar School, Drumragh Integrated College, Loreto Grammar School, Omagh Academy, Omagh High School and Sacred Heart College.

The Department for Education proposed to co-locate Omagh's six existing secondary schools on the former 190-acre St Lucia Army Barracks, as one large shared educational campus. In April 2009, at the inaugural Lisanelly Shared Educational Campus Steering Group meeting held in Arvalee School and Resource Centre, the Education Minister, Caitríona Ruane announced that funding had been allocated for exemplar designs and associated technical work for a shared educational campus. The construction was expected to cost in excess of £120 million. As of March 2022, the shared education campus was scheduled to open in 2026.

=== Third level ===
A campus of South West College, known until 2007 as the Omagh College of Further Education, is located in the town centre.

== Religious buildings ==
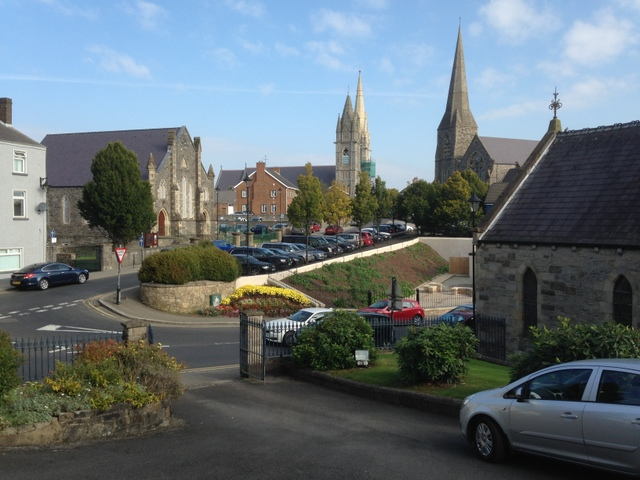
View from Trinity Presbyterian Church towards Sacred Heart (Catholic) church, St Columba's (Anglican) church, and Omagh Methodist Church.

The following is a list of religious buildings in Omagh:

- Christ the King (Roman Catholic)
- Evangelical Presbyterian Church
- Gillygooley Presbyterian Church
- First Omagh Presbyterian
- Independent Methodist
- Kingdom Hall of Jehovah's Witnesses
- Omagh Baptist
- Omagh Community Church (non-denominational)
- Omagh Free Presbyterian Church
- Omagh Gospel Hall (A company of Christians sometimes referred to as "open brethren")
- Omagh Methodist
- Sacred Heart (Roman Catholic)
- St. Columba's (Church of Ireland)
- St. Mary's ( Roman Catholic)
- The Church of Jesus Christ of Latter-day Saints (LDS Church)
- Trinity Presbyterian Church

== Sport ==
=== Gaelic games ===
The town has two Gaelic football clubs, Omagh St. Enda's, which plays its home games in Healy Park, and Drumragh Sarsfields, which plays its home games at Clanabogan.

Healy Park is the home of Tyrone GAA and the county's largest and main sports stadium located on the Gortin Road, has a capacity nearing 25,000, and had the distinction of being the first Gaelic-games stadium in Ulster to have floodlights.

The stadium now hosts the latter matches of the Tyrone Senior Football Championship, as well as Tyrone's home games, and other inter-county matches that require a neutral venue.

=== Football ===
Omagh no longer has a top-flight local football team, since the demise of Omagh Town F.C. in 2005. Strathroy Harps FC are the only Omagh and Tyrone team to win the Irish junior cup twice in 2012 and 2013.

=== Rugby ===
Omagh's rugby team, Omagh Academicals (nicknamed the "Accies"), is an amateur team, made up of primarily of local players.

=== Other sports ===
A greyhound racing track operated from 1932 until 1940. The track was opened by the Duke of Abercorn on 25 May 1932 and racing took place at 'The Park' in the Showgrounds. It was organised by the Tyrone Greyhound Racing Association until 1940.

Omagh Cavaliers Cricket Club is also located in Omagh.

== International relations ==
Omagh is twinned with L'Haÿ-les-Roses in France.

== Notable people ==
- Willie Anderson (born 1955) – Ireland Rugby Union international
- Charles Beattie (1899–1958) – auctioneer and MP
- Barley Bree – Irish folk group
- Janet Devlin (born 1994) – X-Factor finalist 2011 (5th place)
- Martina Devlin – journalist and author
- Brian Friel (1929–2015) – playwright, born in Knockmoyle near Omagh
- Gerald Grosvenor, 6th Duke of Westminster (1951–2016) – peer and major landowner
- Jimmy Kennedy (1902–1984) – Songwriter's Hall of Fame-inductee (Red Sails in the Sunset, Teddy Bears' Picnic)
- Benedict Kiely (1919–2007) – author (Land Without Stars)
- Linda Martin (born 1947) – musician (Eurovision Song Contest-winner 1992)
- Patrick McAlinney (1913–1990) – actor (The Tomorrow People)
- Aoife McArdle – film director
- Frankie McBride (born 1944) – country musician
- Whitey McDonald (born 1902) – football player Northern Ireland national football team, Rangers F.C. and Bethlehem Steel F.C. (1907–30). Inductee, Canada Soccer Hall of Fame.
- Arty McGlynn (1944–2019) – guitarist
- Joe McMahon (born 1983) – All-Ireland-winning Tyrone Gaelic footballer.
- Justin McMahon – All-Ireland-winning Tyrone Gaelic footballer.
- Gerard McSorley (born 1950) – actor, films include Veronica Guerin and Omagh
- John Meahan (1806–1902) – New Brunswick shipbuilder and politician, born and raised in Omagh
- Thomas Mellon (1813–1908) – Irish-American businessman, judge, bank founder
- Alice Milligan (1865–1953) – Protestant Nationalist poet
- Sam Neill (1947–2026) – Jurassic Park actor (born in Omagh)
- Jim Shannon (born 1955) – MP
- Pat Sharkey (born 1953) – Ipswich Town F.C. and Northern Irish football player in the 1970s
- Ivan Sproule (born 1981) – former Northern Irish football international
- Phil Taggart (born 1987) – BBC Radio 1 DJ
- Philip Turbett (born 1961) – bassoonist, clarinettist and saxophonist
- Juliet Turner – singer/songwriter
