= Altmore =

Village and townland in Northern Ireland

Coordinates: 54°33′15″N 6°59′10″W

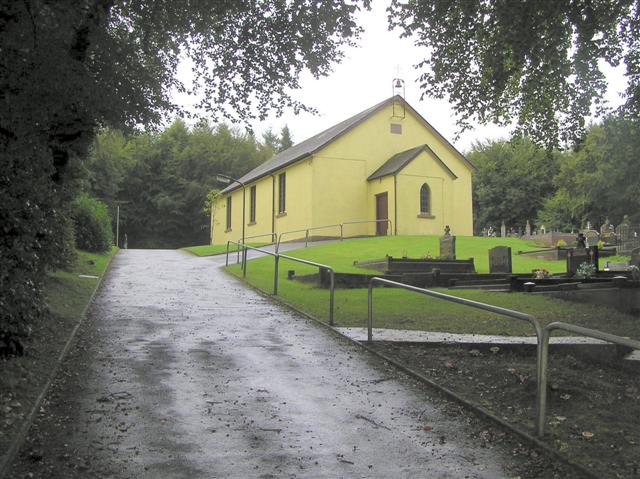
Altmore's Catholic church

Altmore (from Irish: Allt Mór, meaning "great glen") is the name of a hamlet and of a townland in County Tyrone, Northern Ireland. It is five miles from Carrickmore and four miles from Pomeroy. The townland is actually called Altmore (alias Barracktown) and is situated in the historic barony of Dungannon Middle and the civil parish of Pomeroy and covers an area of 1117 acres (4.52 sq km).

== Demographics ==
The population of the townland declined during the nineteenth century:

Year	1841	1851	1861	1871	1881	1891
Population	222	183	226	231	206	160
Houses	46	36	46	48	49	42

== Places of interest ==
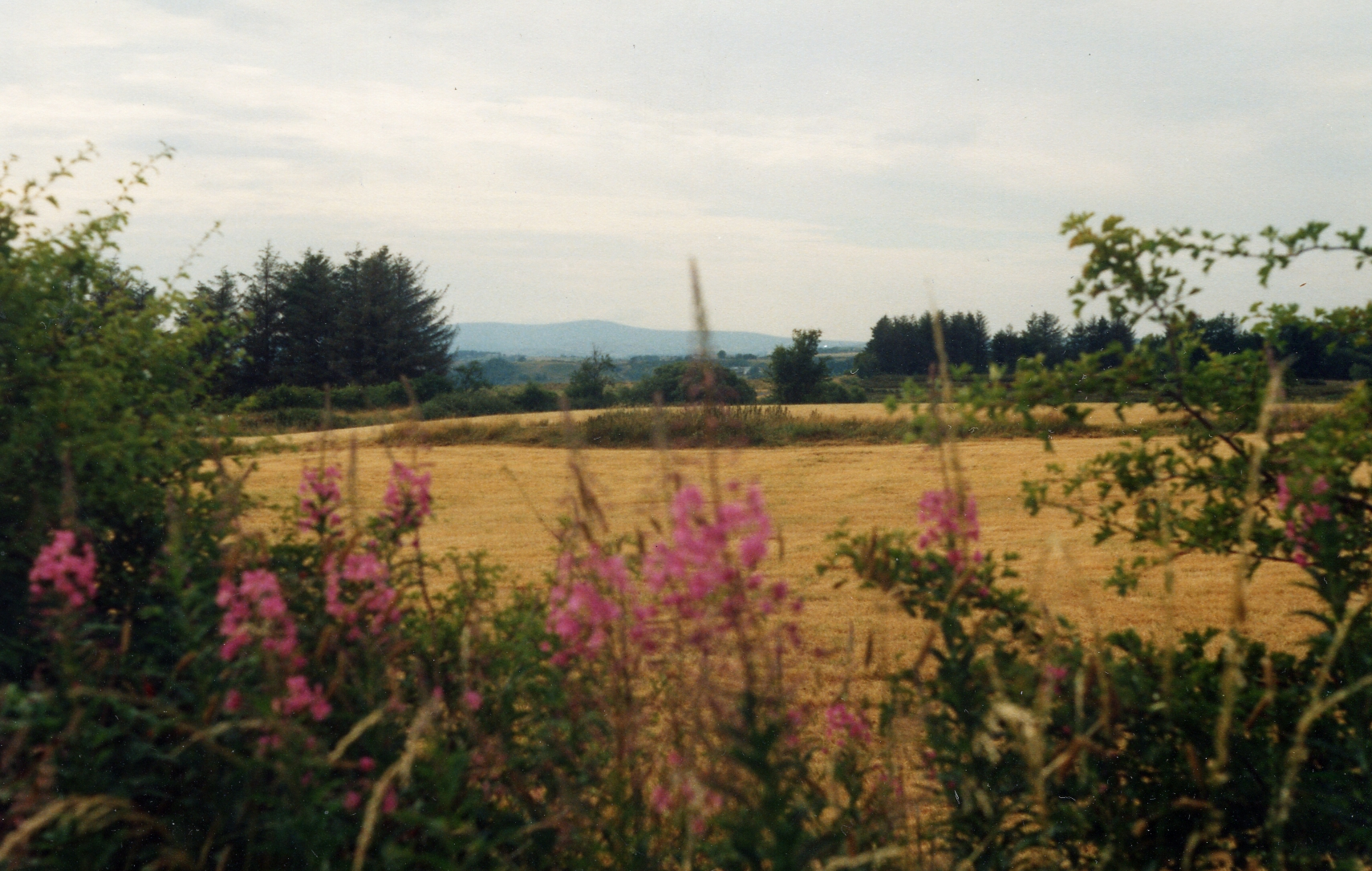
Altmore looking towards Carrickmore, 1989

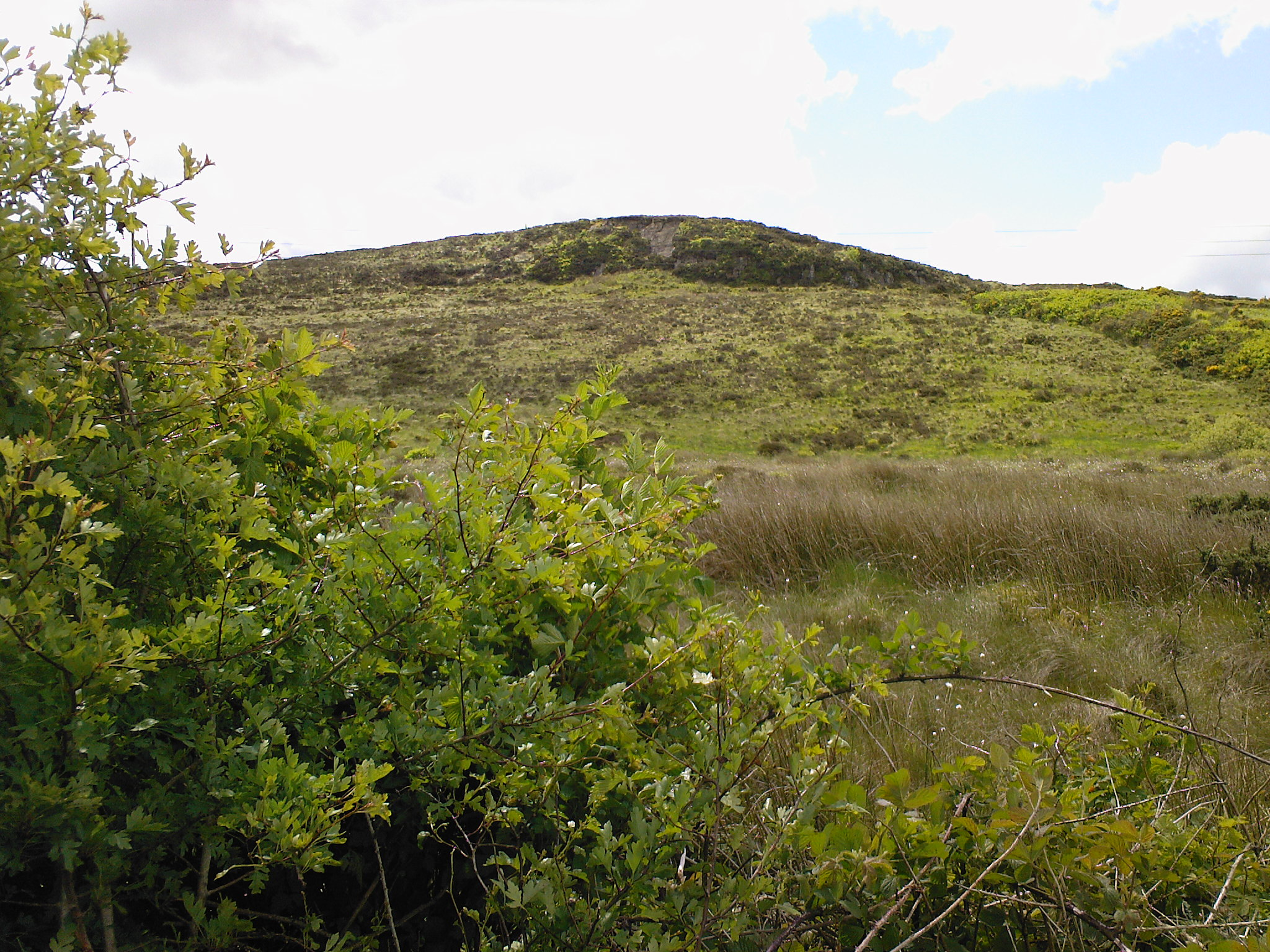
Shane Bernagh’s Chair May 2007

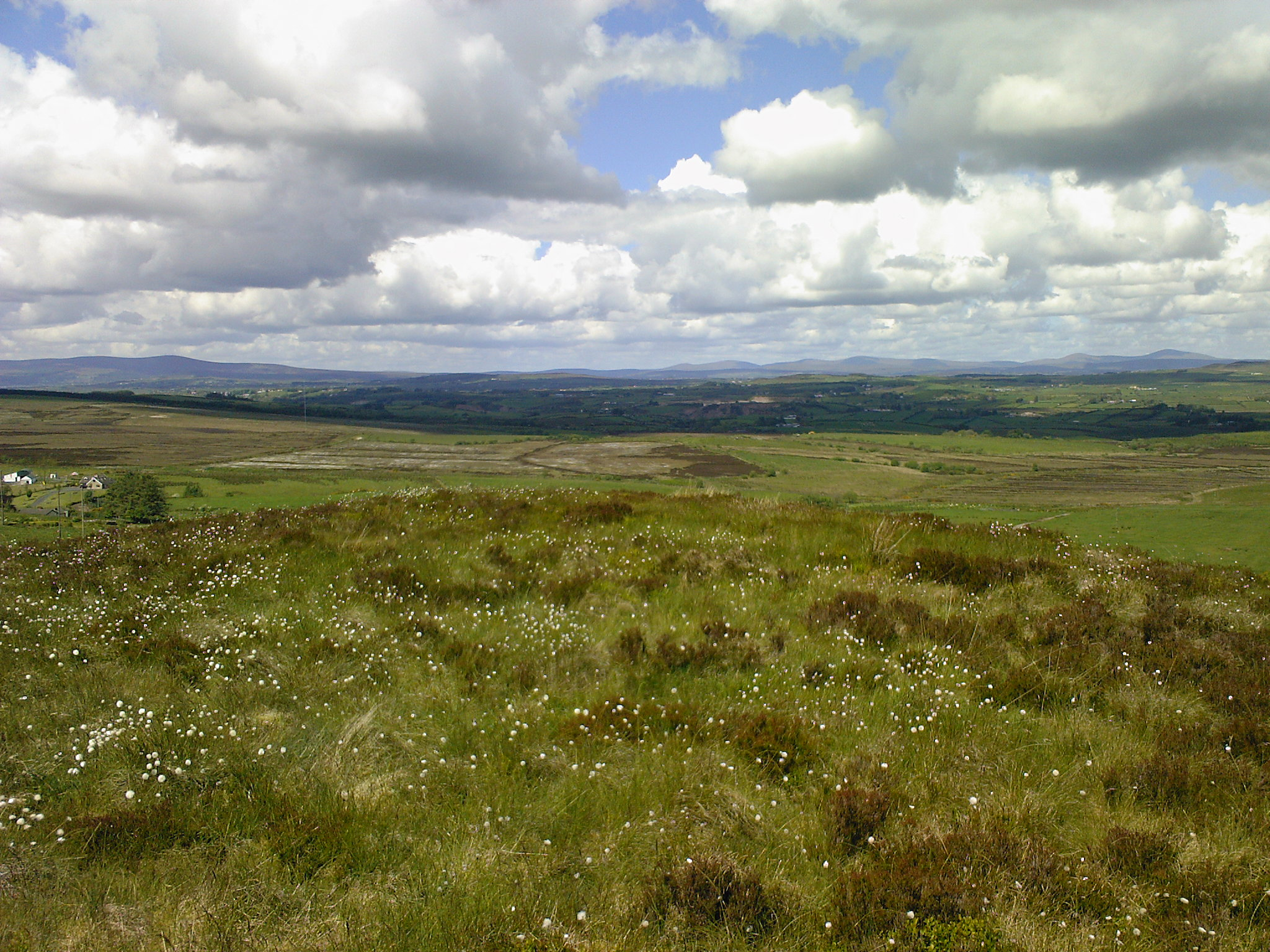
View from Shane Bernagh’s Chair. Looking towards Altmore May 2007.

The townland contains two Scheduled Historic Monuments: a Megalith (grid ref: H6710 6936) and a court tomb (grid ref: H6686 6961). Other places of interest include:

- The Mountains of Pomeroy overlook the area. There are several ancient sites in the area, including some possible burial grounds. Though modern farming methods have diminished a number of them, a few can still be seen.
- Altmore Fisheries is a small holiday site with static caravans and areas to erect tents; there are also log cabins which can be rented and a small shop on site.
- Altmore House was built after 1734 by Patrick Shields. That premises was converted into Barracktown House. The Shields family lived in the house until the 1970s when it was sold and turned into a hotel. The hotel was blown up during the Troubles on two occasions and after several years of dormancy the ruins were eventually knocked down. The house was the birthplace of James Shields who became a politician in North America (being the only person to have served as a United States Senator from three different states).
- Shane Bernagh’s Chair is a small rocky area on the outskirts of Cappagh and Altmore. It received its fame from local highwayman Shane Bernagh, who used the mountain area as a vantage point to hold up carriages travelling on the main Dublin to Derry road nearby. Local legend has it that the highwayman assisted impoverished locals with his robberies, which primarily targeted members of the Protestant Ascendancy. A barracks was built in the Altmore area in an attempt to curb his activities but to little avail. Because of this Bernagh has over time become a local legend in the mould of Robin Hood who robbed from the rich and gave to the poor. He was eventually captured and executed by the Dublin Castle administration, and his body was cast into a lough at the summit of Slieve Beagh, which straddles the counties of Tyrone, Fermanagh and Monaghan. His life was covered in the ballad "The Mountains of Pomeroy". The actual rocky area looks like a chair and has thus become known as Shane Bernagh's Chair.

== Notable people ==
- Shane Bernagh, 17th century rapparee
- James Shields (1806–1879), the only person in U.S. history to serve as a Senator for three different states

== See also ==
- List of townlands of County Tyrone
- List of archaeological sites in County Tyrone
