= Cappagh, County Tyrone =

Village in County Tyrone, Northern Ireland

Coordinates: 54°32′34″N 6°55′33″W

Cappagh (Irish: Ceapach (tilled or cultivated land)) is a small village and townland in the parish of Pomeroy in County Tyrone, Northern Ireland. Around 10 kilometres (6 mi) north-west of Dungannon, it is between Pomeroy, Ballygawley, Galbally and Carrickmore, with the hamlet of Galbally about one mile to the east. Most of the land around Cappagh is farmland although a quarry lies just outside the village. In County Tyrone, there is also the parish of Cappagh which includes part of the town of Omagh and small village of Mountfield.

== Places of interest ==
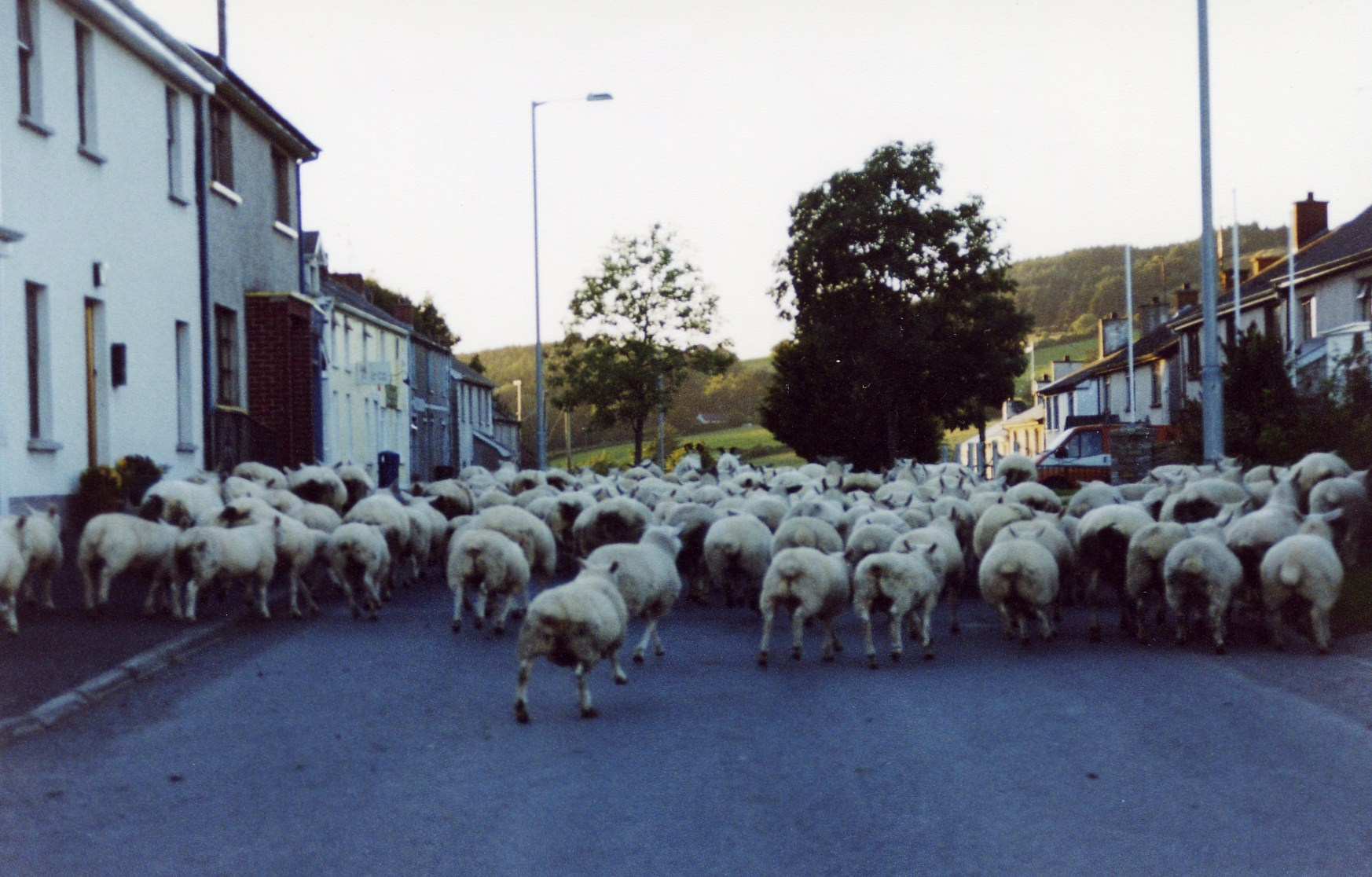
Sheep in the village of Cappagh, 2004

The village is located on a hillside and immediately behind it stands Cappagh Mountain (948 feet tall). The area around Cappagh has fine mountain scenery where the land is a mixture of rural pastures and bog. These bog and peat lands still provide turf for the older generation of the area. Travelling towards Altmore on the right hand side of the road is "King James's Well". Further on was once a small house that occupied some of the finest miniature model houses and castles in Northern Ireland.

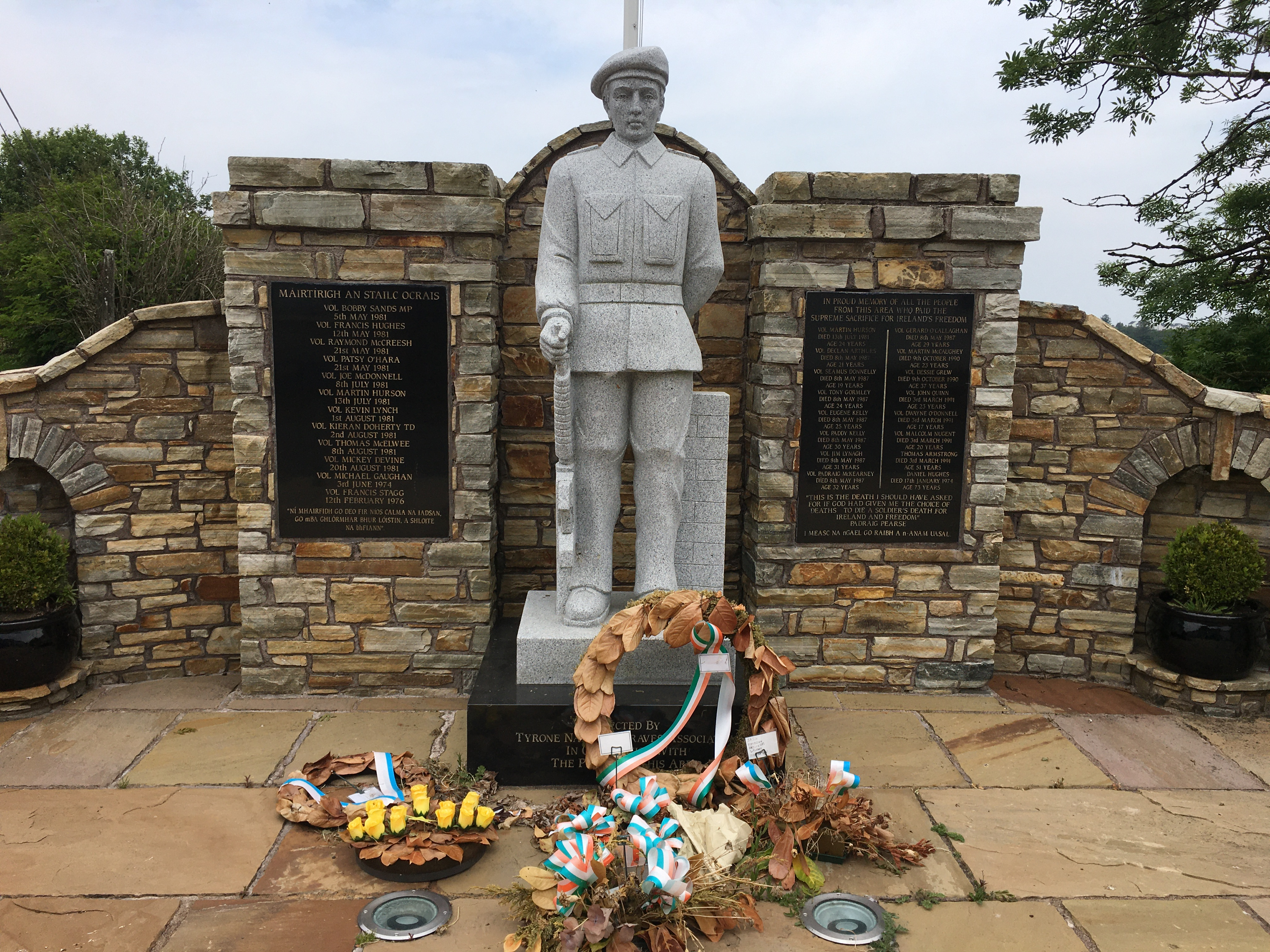
Monument commemorating people from the area who were killed during the Troubles and those who died on Hunger Strike.

Cappagh Monument - In the middle of the village, a monument was installed in 2001 to commemorate all individuals from the area who were killed during The Troubles. It features a stone figure of a Provisional Irish Republican Army (IRA) volunteer, in front of a number of stone plaques commemorating various aspects of the conflict, such as the 1981 hunger strike and local republicans who died. The focal point on the plaque are the names of eight IRA volunteers who died during an unsuccessful attack on a local Royal Ulster Constabulary (RUC) police station, which became known as the Loughgall ambush.

== The Troubles in Cappagh ==
At least 10 people in and around Cappagh lost their lives during the Troubles, according to CAIN website. Three were members of the IRA, three were RUC police officers, one was a former soldier in the Ulster Defence Regiment (UDR), two were Catholic civilians and the tenth member was a Protestant civilian. The first person from the area to die was a Catholic civilian who was shot and killed in January 1974 by loyalist assailants. The three IRA members and one of the Catholic civilians were killed by the Ulster Volunteer Force (UVF) in an incident outside a local bar on 3 March 1991; a unit of the UVF's Mid-Ulster Brigade drove to the staunchly republican village and shot dead the four people at the bar. The remaining five people were killed by the IRA.

The village, famed as being a Republican stronghold, was also the scene of another two significant events in the early 1990s. On 24 March 1990, there was a gun battle between an IRA unit and undercover British troops when a civilian-type vehicle driven by a soldier was purportedly fired on by nearby volunteers without warning. Republican sources subsequently claimed a planned ambush against the IRA by the Special Air Service (SAS) was thwarted and at least two undercover soldiers in the car were killed.

Two years later, another major incident occurred in the area. On 12 May 1992, a British patrol consisting of soldiers from the 3rd Battalion, Parachute Regiment was struck by an IRA improvised explosive device, wounding one soldier who lost both his legs. Elements of the battalion present in the area subsequently clashed with residents in the nearby town of Coalisland, resulting in several people being injured on both sides. The RUC alleged that a light machine gun stolen during the clash was later recovered at a farmhouse near Cappagh, as part of a weapons cache. The incident led to the suspension of patrols before the official end of the battalion's deployment to Northern Ireland and to the discharge of the unit's commander, Brigadier Tom Longland.

== Cappagh Townland ==
The townland is situated in the historic barony of Dungannon Middle and the civil parish of Pomeroy and covers an area of 464 acres. The population of the townland declined during the 19th century:

Year	1841	1851	1861	1871	1881	1891
Population	184	155	191	192	176	141
Houses	34	32	41	41	42	38

== Notable people ==
- Martin Hurson: IRA volunteer who died during the 1981 Irish hunger strike

== See also ==
- List of townlands of County Tyrone
- List of civil parishes of County Tyrone
- Shanmaghery
- Altmore
- Gortavoy Bridge
