= Priest's Leap =

Mountain pass in Ireland

Coordinates: 51.793333°N 9.471111°W

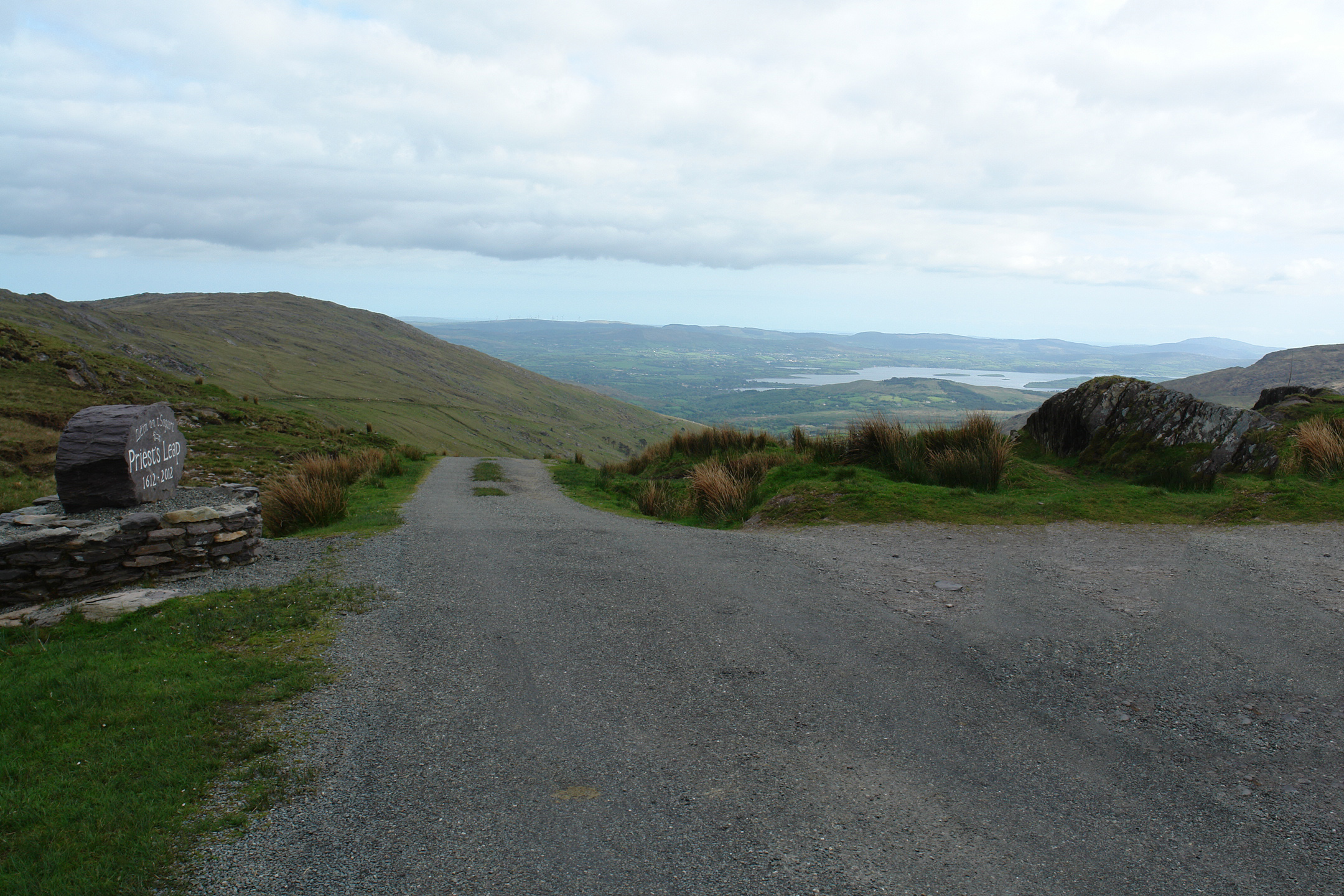
Summit of the Priest's Leap pass with a view south to Bantry Bay, County Cork

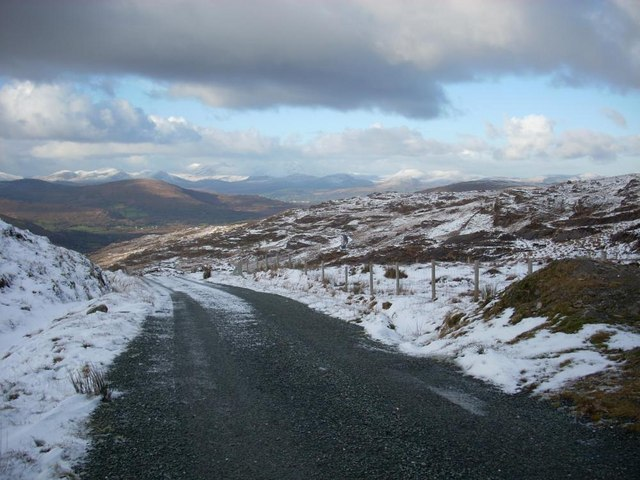
Summit of the Priest's Leap pass with a view north to County Kerry

Priest's Leap (Irish: Léim an tSagairt) is a steep and nearly straight single-lane mountain pass between Coomhola Bridge and the village of Bonane east of the more winding road from Bantry to Kenmare in the south of Ireland. Just below the summit of the 519 m high mountain with the same name, it is the highest pass road in Munster at 463 m, crossing from County Cork to County Kerry.

== Location ==
The single-track road over Priest's Leap is very narrow, partially with a soft surface with a green strip in the centre and a very steep section north of the summit. There are a few passing places, and reversing may be required when meeting oncoming traffic.

== Name ==
According to local tradition, the placename stems from an old legend, in which a Roman Catholic priest pursued by priest hunters escaped by a miraculous leap of his horse from a mountain cliff in the townland of Cummeenshrule into the County Cork. The pursuit of the priest began in the townland of Killabunane where a rock, which allegedly melted under the pursuing hounds, can still be seen today. The rock, deeply pitted with what look like pawmarks, is situated near the main road to Kenmare. It is known locally as Carraig na Gadharaigh. Marks of the priest’s knees and hands and of the horse’s hooves appear on another rock a few miles from Bantry, where he is said to have landed after his miraculous leap.

In the Desmond Survey map of the Glanarought barony, which was compiled around 1600, the pass is clearly marked as The Priest’s Lepp. The antiquarian Caesar Otway refers to it 1827 in his Sketches of the south of Ireland, but couldn't clearly trace back to the identity of the priest. The legend might either refer to a Jesuit lay brother, Dominic Collins, who had been out raising the country for the defence of Donal Cam O'Sullivan Beare’s castle of Dunboy, who was indeed present in the district at the time of the siege of Dunboy in 1602. He was captured in the course of the siege and later put to death. He was beatified in Rome on 27 September 1992. Alternatively, it might be refer to the Jesuit Father James Archer, who was also involved at Dunboy. Both identifications derive probably from later literary allusion rather than authentic folk tradition, because the reference in the Desmond Survey predates the siege of Dunboy castle.

== See also ==
- List of highest paved roads in Europe by country
- Leap, County Cork - a town with a similar name based on a similar legend
