= Sagart =

Sagart may refer to:

- Laurent Sagart (born 1951), French linguist
- Sean na Sagart (1690–1726), Irish priest hunter
