= Killay, County Tyrone =

Place in Northern Ireland

Killay
- Coordinates: 54.580531°N 6.912872°W

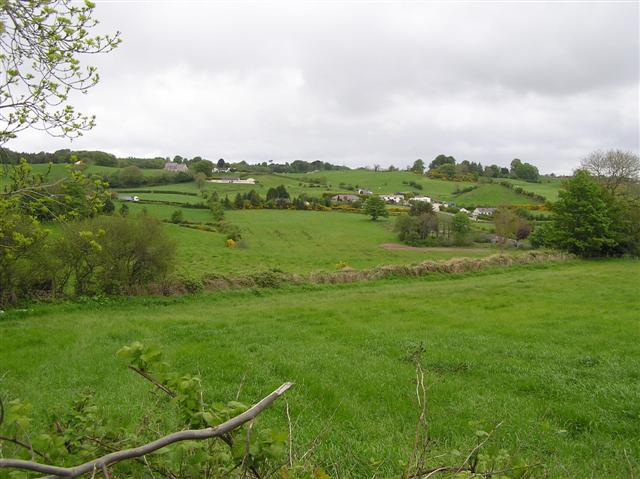
Killey townland in 2006

Killay or Killey (possibly from Irish Coill Aodha, meaning 'Hugh's wood') is a townland (of 352 acres) and hamlet near Pomeroy in County Tyrone, Northern Ireland. The area of Killay is rural and the main livelihood is farming. It is surrounded by the townlands of Cavanacaw, Tanderagee, Lurganeden, Aughafad, Turnabarson, Gortnagarn and Cavanakeeran.

Killay was the home-town of one of the oldest men who ever lived, George Fletcher, who died in 1906 aged 118. Edward VII commemorated this with a gold snuff box in 1904. At the time Fletcher was the oldest person in the United Kingdom.

Killay originated from the estate of Sir William Parsons, Surveyor General of Ireland in the 17th century, who received 1,000-acre (4 km^{2}) estate as part of the Plantation of Ulster.
