= Killay =

Killay may refer to:

- Killay, County Tyrone, a townland and hamlet near Pomeroy in County Tyrone, Northern Ireland
- Killay, Swansea, a suburb and local government community in Swansea, Wales
