= Cappagh killings =

Ulster loyalist attack in Northern Ireland

- Part of the Troubles
- Location: 54°32′29.40″N 6°55′27.19″W; Boyle's Bar, Cappagh, County Tyrone; Northern Ireland
- Date: 3 March 1991; 10:30 pm
- Attack type: Shooting
- Deaths: 4
- Injuries: 1
- Perpetrator: Ulster Volunteer Force

On 3 March 1991, members of the Ulster Volunteer Force (UVF) Mid-Ulster Brigade opened fire at Boyle’s Bar in Cappagh, County Tyrone, killing three members of the Provisional IRA and a Catholic civilian. No one has ever been charged in connection with the attack, which was widely attributed to Billy Wright, a senior UVF figure based in Portadown.

== The shootings ==
On Sunday 3 March 1991, a team from the Mid-Ulster Brigade of the Ulster Volunteer Force drove into Cappagh, County Tyrone intent on killing a local republican who was a regular customer at Boyle's Bar. Their target was reportedly Brian Arthurs, believed to be a leading member of the Provisional IRA East Tyrone Brigade. His brother Declan had been killed in the Loughgall ambush in 1987. A second UVF team, acting as a 'recce vehicle', had guided the first team in the journey from Portadown. They parked up on the outskirts of the village while the first vehicle 'silently glided' up the hill towards Cappagh.

Around 10:30pm a blue Peugeot 305 pulled up outside the bar. It was occupied by four IRA members: John Quinn (23) was driving, and his passengers were Malcolm Nugent (20), Dwayne O'Donnell (17), and Malachy Rafferty (21). Two men in balaclavas, one of whom was Mark Fulton, opened fire with vz. 58 assault rifles before Quinn had even turned the engine off. Quinn and O'Donnell, sitting in the front seats, were killed immediately. Nugent ran from the vehicle but was shot repeatedly by one of the gunmen. This failed escape likely saved a 'petrified' Rafferty, who remained hidden in the car after being wounded in the opening salvo of fire.

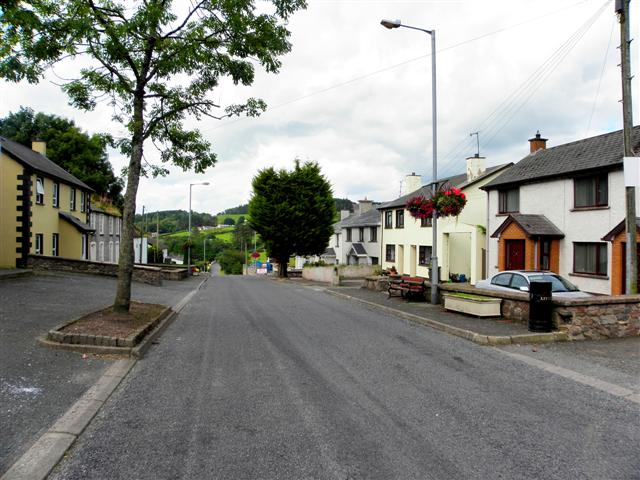
Cappagh (2012)

Alerted by the noise, Boyle's customers barricaded the door, which prevented the gunmen from attacking Brian Arthurs. Frustrated, one of them stuck his gun barrel through a toilet window and opened fire, killing Thomas Armstrong (52), who had been sheltering inside. They then returned to their car and were driven away by a third man. As he told a later inquest, Rafferty 'lay for a while' before running towards the door of Boyle's and shouting his name to get inside. He then passed out.

According to a former RUC Special Branch officer interviewed by author Jonathan Trigg, the UVF hit team did not follow the recce vehicle back toward Portadown. Instead, to 'throw the Provos off the scent' they stayed overnight locally, opting for a nearby farm owned by a UVF associate. The officer conceded this was unexpectedly clever, but noted it risked a violent backlash against Protestants living in the area if discovered.

=== Aftermath ===
After the attack, the UVF issued a statement:

This was not a sectarian attack on the Catholic community, but was an operation directed at the very roots of the Provisional IRA command structure in the Armagh–Tyrone area.

Billy Wright, leader of the UVF in Portadown, took credit. Special Branch believed Wright had overseen the attack, though they also suspected the idea first originated in Belfast. Clifford Peeples, a former loyalist prisoner, has also singled out Wright as the key figure behind the killings:

as for Cappagh. . . it was Mid-Ulster UVF, and Billy Wright was Brigade Commander Mid-Ulster UVF, end of story.

While senior UVF members in Belfast later insisted that Wright had no involvement, these claims did come at a time when Wright had split from the UVF to form the rival Loyalist Volunteer Force (LVF), and were therefore likely motivated by a desire to discredit both him and the upstart LVF.

It quickly leaked that all the dead except Armstrong were active IRA members. (Note: All three were 'relatively inexperienced' and formed the nucleus of a new active service unit. They had a background working in local engineering firms, and O'Donnell had only recently been released from hospital following a work accident.) Quinn was the most well-known, having been alongside Martin McCaughey during a March 1990 shootout in which the latter had been seriously wounded by an undercover soldier. Despite this, the IRA did not acknowledge Quinn, Nugent and O'Donnell for a year, and the trio 'were depicted in Sinn Féin propaganda as innocent Catholic victims' of sectarian violence — this was apparently aimed at 'currying sympathy' in the Irish republic, where people were less likely to know the truth, though it 'enraged' many republicans in Tyrone.

== Allegations ==
A journalist from the Philadelphia Inquirer interviewed Cappagh locals at the joint funeral of the four victims, reporting a belief among many that the killings could only have been carried out with the cooperation of the security forces. Claims of this nature were notably popularised by an October 1991 episode of the Channel 4 programme Dispatches that drew on the evidence of Jim Sands, a former Portadown resident.

Billy Wright dismissed these allegations, and alleged the UVF were being forced to abort 'three out of every four operations' because of security force activity. Nevertheless, he boasted to an interviewer from The Guardian years later that members of the security forces had suggested they were pleased with the deaths:

I genuinely believe that we were very successful, and that may sound morbid but they know that we hammered them into the ground and we didn't lose one volunteer. Indeed, members of the security forces had said that we done what they couldn't do, we put the East Tyrone brigade of the IRA on the run.

This gave 'additional oxygen to the oft-repeated charges of collusion' between security forces and militant loyalists.

A point of contention is whether the gunmen were expecting Quinn, Nugent, O'Donnell and Rafferty. In their 1997 book UVF, Jim Cusack and Henry McDonald stated the attackers were awaiting the arrival of a car driven by IRA members, which indicated they had received intelligence in advance. Similarly, Peter Taylor argued 'some degree of assistance' from the security forces was needed in order to know the movements of the car. He proposed this would most likely have come from local members of the Ulster Defence Regiment (UDR).

In contrast, former soldiers Ken Wharton and Jonathan Trigg have contended that the gunmen likely had no prior confirmation their victims were IRA members, which implied the plan was less 'well-executed' than the UVF would later pretend. Alternatively, David McKittrick in Lost Lives speculated that one of the hit team may have recognized the 'very distinctive appearance' of John Quinn, who was completely bald, thus distracting from the original target inside the bar. During a 1994 inquest, Rafferty admitted he and the other occupants of the car had only decided 'on the spur of the moment' to visit Boyle's following an earlier trip to another pub in nearby Pomeroy. As a result, the competing theory that the deaths of Quinn, Nugent and O'Donnell were not pre-planned but an opportunistic 'bonus' became increasingly common.

At the time, police refused to confirm whether individuals questioned in the aftermath included members of the security forces. A 2020 report by the Historical Enquiries Team revealed that three serving UDR soldiers had been arrested in December 1991 and questioned for several days, but eventually released without charge.

== Later events ==
Under pressure to avenge the Cappagh killings, the local IRA searched for a target. On the evening of the 9 April, builder Derek Ferguson (31) was shot dead at his temporary mobile home at Aughaveagh Road, Coagh. Accused by the IRA of being a UVF member, both his family and the RUC denied this, with the UVF even issuing a statement to reject the claim. It is more likely his status as an employee of Henry Brothers construction, the 'sworn enemy' of the East Tyrone Brigade for their work with the security forces, was the sole motivation behind his murder.

Brian Arthurs was arrested for possessing explosives in 1995. Sentenced to 25 years in prison, he was released in 2000 under the terms of the Good Friday Agreement. In January 2013 he pled guilty after being charged with a £250,000 mortgage fraud.

The IRA made at least five botched assassination attempts against Billy Wright. On 27 December 1997, INLA prisoner Christopher 'Crip' McWilliams succeeded in killing him using a smuggled gun inside Maze Prison.

== See also ==
- Timeline of Ulster Volunteer Force actions
