= Shane Bernagh =

Shane Bernagh Donnelly was an Irish rapparee who was active in the Cappagh and Altmore area of County Tyrone during the 17th century who would use the mountains as a vantage point to launch daring hold ups on carriages passing through the area on the main Dublin to Derry road nearby. Local legend has it that the highwayman assisted impoverished locals with his robberies, which primarily targeted members of the Protestant Ascendancy. A barracks was built in the Altmore area in an attempt to curb his activities but to little avail. Because of this Bernagh has over time become a local legend in the mould of Robin Hood who robbed from the rich and gave to the poor.

For example, in the Slieve Beagh mountains of County Monaghan, a large Celtic cross now tops a Mass rock known as Leacht a 'tSagairt ("The Priest's Flagstone"). The cross is said in the local oral tradition to mark where a priest hunter fatally shot a Fr. McKenna while he was saying Mass there on Christmas Day. The priest hunter is said to have been assassinated by Shane Bernagh soon afterwards in nearby Emyvale. Another oral tradition version of the same events credits the killing to a Yeomanry unit from Clogher and gives the slain priest's name as Father Milligan. The same source also alleges that Shane Bernagh, after learning almost immediately afterwards of the priest's murder while in hiding nearby, "swore that he would have a Yeoman's life for this". Bernagh and his band of rapparees are then alleged to have ambushed the Yeomanry during their return to barracks, killed one of them, and thrown his body into Lough More.

He was eventually captured and executed by the Dublin Castle administration, and his body was cast into a lough at the summit of Slieve Beagh, which straddles the counties of Tyrone, Fermanagh and Monaghan.

== Legacy ==
He was immortalised further by local scholar George Sigerson in his ballad The Mountains of Pomeroy and Irish poet John Montague in his poem A Lost Tradition. There is a small rocky area on the outskirts of Cappagh and Altmore called Shane Bernagh's Chair, called so as it is shaped like a chair. It received its fame from the highwayman, who used the rugged mountain area to hide out and launch his next attack on his unsuspecting victims. Local oral tradition says that the nearby Bernish Glen gave Shane his middle name, Bernagh, after Donnelly jumped across the glen on horse back as he sought to evade Crown soldiers pursuing him.

A verse from Montague's A Lost Tradition states that:

The heathery gap where the Rapparee, Shane Bernagh, saw his brother die. On a summer's day the dying sun stained its colours to crimson. So breaks the heart, Brish mó Cree.
