= Brian McGurk =

Brian McGurk (Maguirc) was a Catholic Dean of Armagh during the Penal Times in Ireland, and was Vicar-General to St Oliver Plunkett.

== Background ==
He was imprisoned in Armagh under penal laws in 1712 while in his late eighties. He died in Gaol aged 91 years

Brian McGurk was Dean of Armagh for forty years and parish priest of Termonmagurk 1660–1672, arrested five times under the penal law statute, but who out-witted the courts with his knowledge of canon and civil laws yet dying at ninety-one in Armagh jail. He is still revered as a 'white martyr' in Termonmagurk where both churches, Catholic and Protestant are under the patronage of St. Columcille, the McGurks being the saint's coarbs and erenaghs in that parish.

Brian was born and raised in the townland of Aughnagreggan, near Carrickmore, County Tyrone. In 2013 a small monument was erected on the site of his home to commemorate the 300th anniversary of his death. A secondary school in the village is named after him. A Celtic cross stands in the grounds of the Roman Catholic Church dedicated to his memory.
