= Bonane Heritage Park =

Archaeological preserve, County Kerry, Ireland

Coordinates: 51.8296°N 9.5202°W

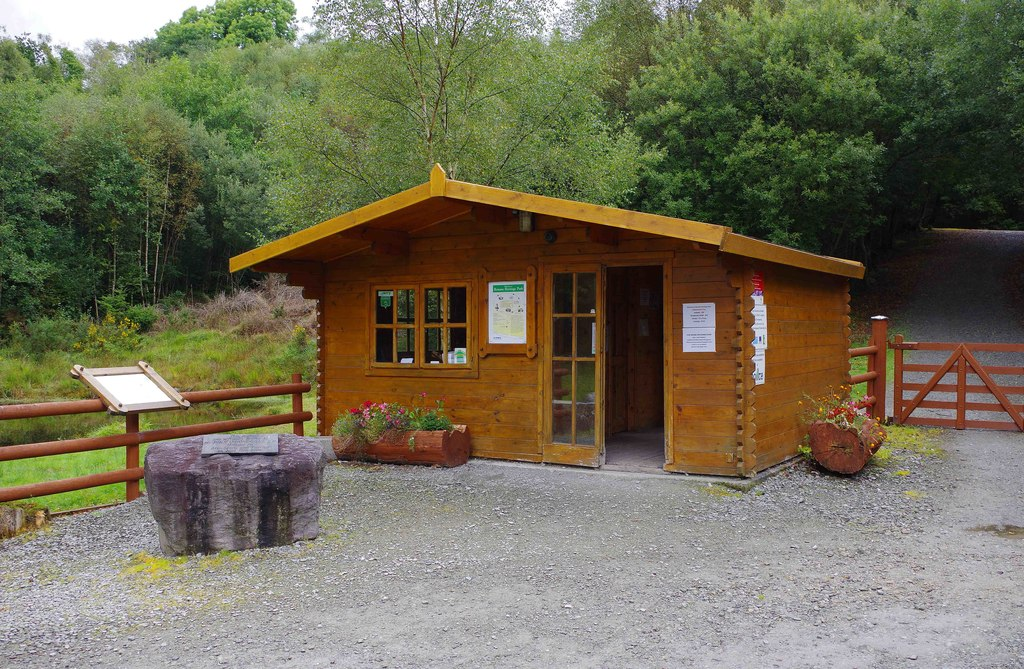
Park ticket office

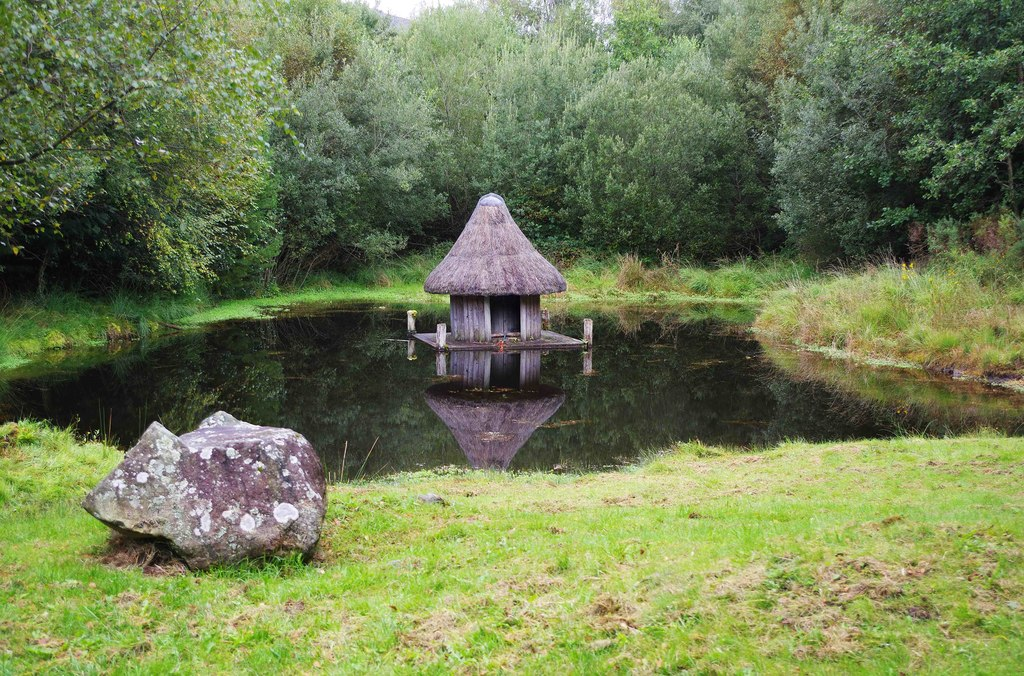
Interpreted model of a crannog

Bonane Heritage Park is a private archaeological preserve and tourist attraction between Bonane and Kenmare in County Kerry, Ireland.

The area is surrounded by the Sheehy and Caha Mountains. It is home to a number of archaeological remains, including ring fort and stone circle sites. Some studies have indicated that some of these archaeological remains "may well have had an astronomical significance".
