= Derrew =

Village in County Mayo, Ireland

Derrew is a village located near the Partry Mountains in County Mayo, Ireland.

== Local residents ==
- Sean na Sagart, born Sean O'Mullowny, a notorious priest hunter in County Mayo during the early 18th century.

== See also ==
- List of towns and villages in Ireland
