= Shanmaghery =

Hamlet in County Tyrone, Northern Ireland

Coordinates: 54.564°N 6.892°W

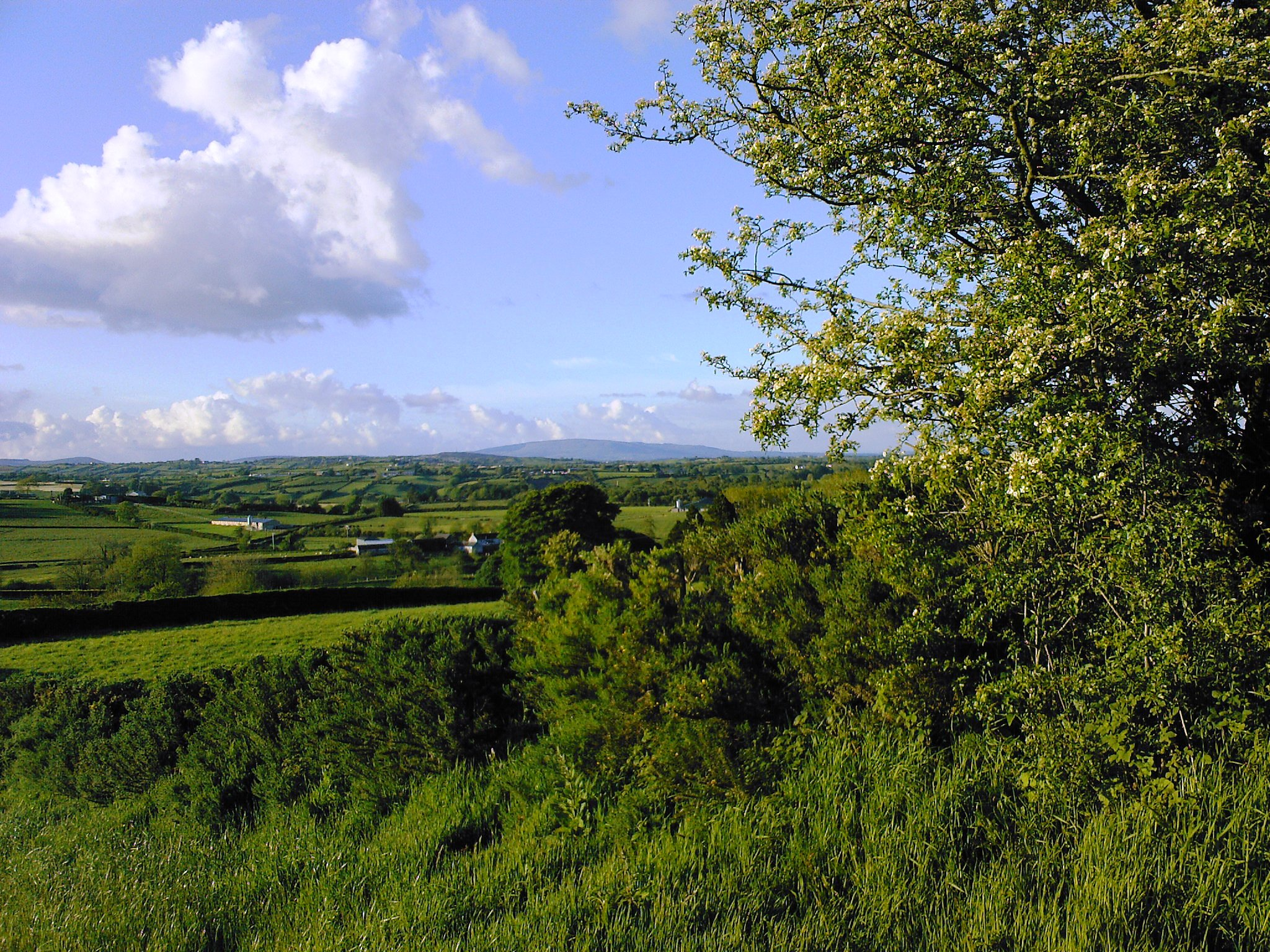
Shanmaghery in May 2007

Shanmaghery or Shanmaghry (from Irish Sean-mhachaire, meaning 'old plain') is a small hamlet and townland in County Tyrone, Northern Ireland, situated three miles from Pomeroy and three miles from Galbally. It is situated in the barony of Dungannon Middle and the civil parish of Pomeroy and covers an area of 426 acres. In 1841 the population of the townland was 193 people (33 houses) and in 1851 it was 161 people (27 houses). "Paul's Planting" was a notable landmark on top of the hill.

== Local interest ==
The townland contains one Scheduled Historic Monument: a wedge tomb (grid ref: H7065 6850). The stones forming the ante-chamber and burial chamber can be seen, but none of the roof lintels have survived. There is substantial cairn material and the burial chamber is filled with rubble.

== Gortavoy Bridge ==
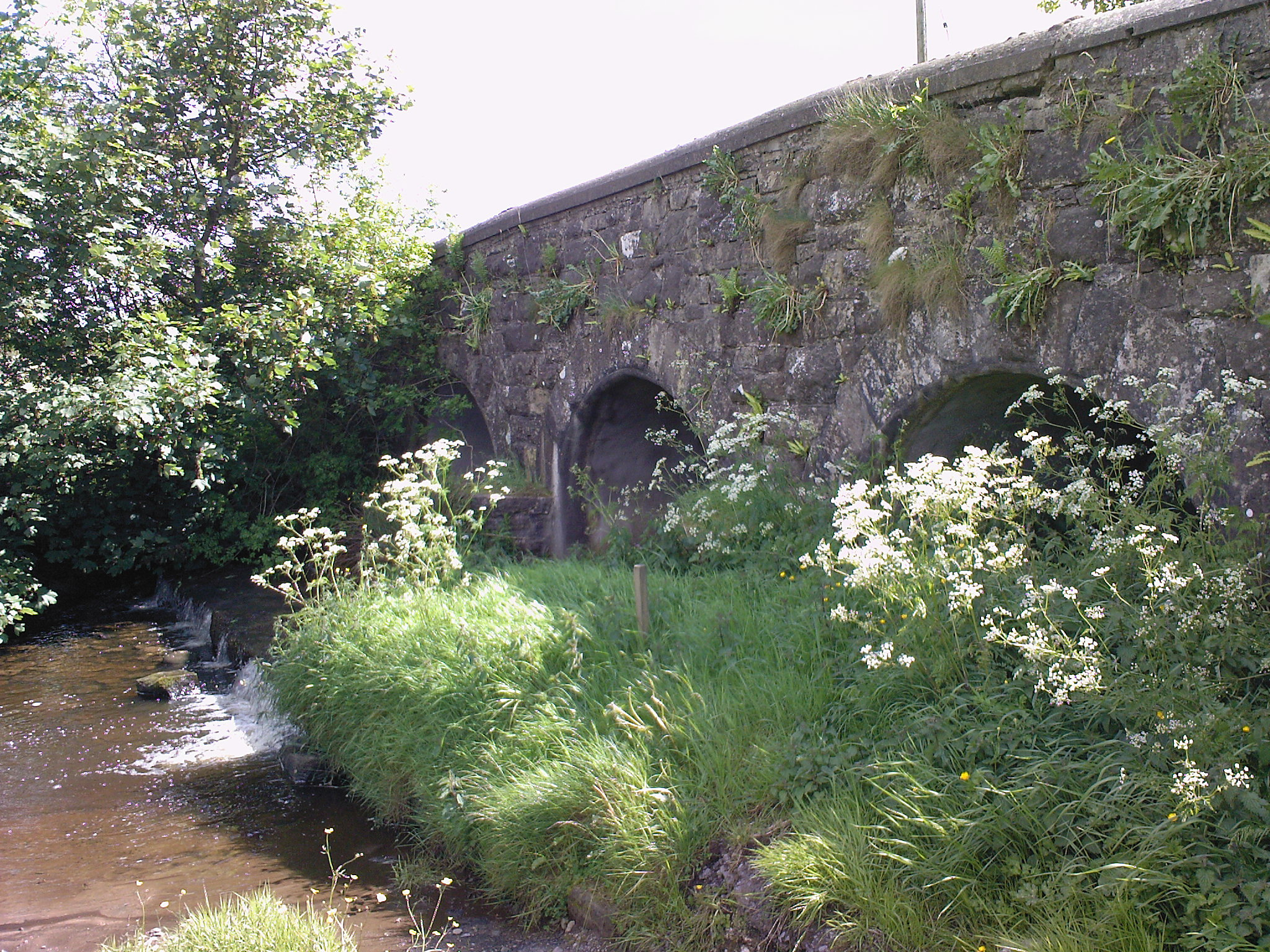
Gortavoy Bridge

Gortavoy Bridge is a modern residential area located on the B43 road that links Pomeroy to Donaghmore. The local homesteads of Corrycroar and Coolmaghry are nearby. The area takes its name from the local bridge. At the rear of Gortavoy Bridge is the now dismantled railway line to Pomeroy.

== See also ==
- List of townlands of County Tyrone
- List of archaeological sites in County Tyrone
- List of villages in Northern Ireland
