= Martin Hurson =

Irish Republican (1956–1981)

- Máirtín Ó hUrsáin
- Born: Edward Martin Hurson; 13 September 1956; Cappagh, County Tyrone, Northern Ireland
- Died: 13 July 1981 (aged 24); HM Prison Maze, County Down, Northern Ireland
- Cause of death: Died after 46 days on hunger strike
- Burial place: Galbally, County Tyrone, Northern Ireland
- Military career
- Paramilitary: Provisional IRA
- Rank: Volunteer
- Unit: East Tyrone Brigade
- Conflicts: The Troubles

Edward Martin Hurson (13 September 1956 – 13 July 1981) was an Irish Republican hunger striker and a Volunteer in the East Tyrone Brigade of the Provisional Irish Republican Army (IRA). He was the sixth to die during the 1981 Irish Hunger Strike.

== Background ==
Edward Martin Hurson, from Cappagh, County Tyrone, Northern Ireland, was one of nine children born to Johnny and Mary Ann Hurson.

After leaving school, he worked as a welder for a while before going to England where he stayed for eighteen months with his brother Francis and worked in the building trade. Returning to County Tyrone at the end of 1974, both he and his brother spent time in Bundoran, County Donegal.

== IRA activities ==
In November 1976, Hurson, together with Kevin O’Brien, Dermot Boyle, Peter Kane and Pat O’Neill were arrested. Hurson was held and interrogated at the Omagh and Armagh police barracks before being detained in the H-Blocks of Long Kesh (HM Prison Maze) until his trial in November 1977. No forensic evidence was submitted against any of the five men, and the prosecution relied on signed statements which Hurson and his co-defendants alleged had been extracted under torture. Hurson was convicted of involvement in three IRA landmine incidents, one at Cappagh in September, one at Galbally, County Tyrone in November 1975 and a third at Reclain (near Dungannon) in February 1976, when several members of the Royal Ulster Constabulary (RUC) and Ulster Defence Regiment narrowly escaped being killed. He received concurrent sentences of twenty, fifteen and five years for these convictions. Hurson was beaten multiple times by police and prison guards and in December 1978 spent a month in the prison hospital after being forcibly washed and badly beaten.

== Hunger strike and Death ==
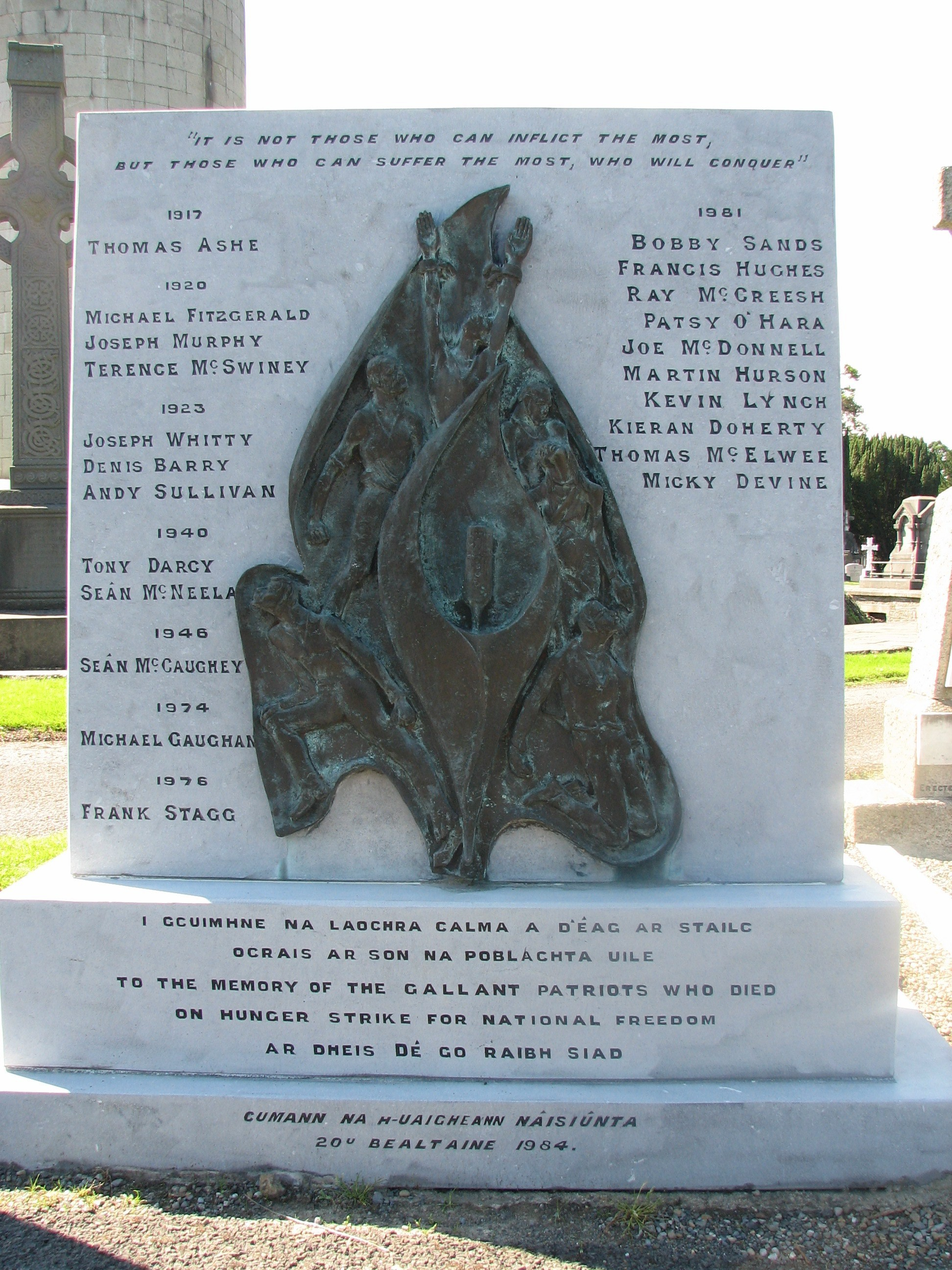
Hunger Strikers Memorial Glasnevin Cemetery Dublin

Hurson became engaged to his long-term girlfriend, Bernadette Donnelly, while in prison. He was part of the blanket protest and joined the 1981 hunger strike on 28 May, replacing Brendan McLaughlin who withdrew following a perforated stomach ulcer.

At the 1981 Irish general election, Hurson was an unsuccessful candidate in the Longford–Westmeath, receiving 4,573 (10.1%) first-preference votes.

He lost the ability to hold down water after around 40 days on hunger strike, and died of dehydration after only 46 days, considerably shorter than the others (the next shortest was Francis Hughes at 59 days). Near the end, his family considered the possibility of intervening to save his life, but they were told that he would probably have permanent brain damage. Shortly after his death (and without consulting his family) the body of Martin Hurson was removed from the Maze prison by the RUC and moved to Omagh Hospital. Over 100 cars followed Hurson's hearse from Omagh to his family home in Cappagh, County Tyrone. Hurson was then buried in the village of Galbally in County Tyrone.
