= Patrician Hall =

Cultural, arts, and entertainment venue in Northern Ireland

Coordinates: 54.597°N 7.053°W

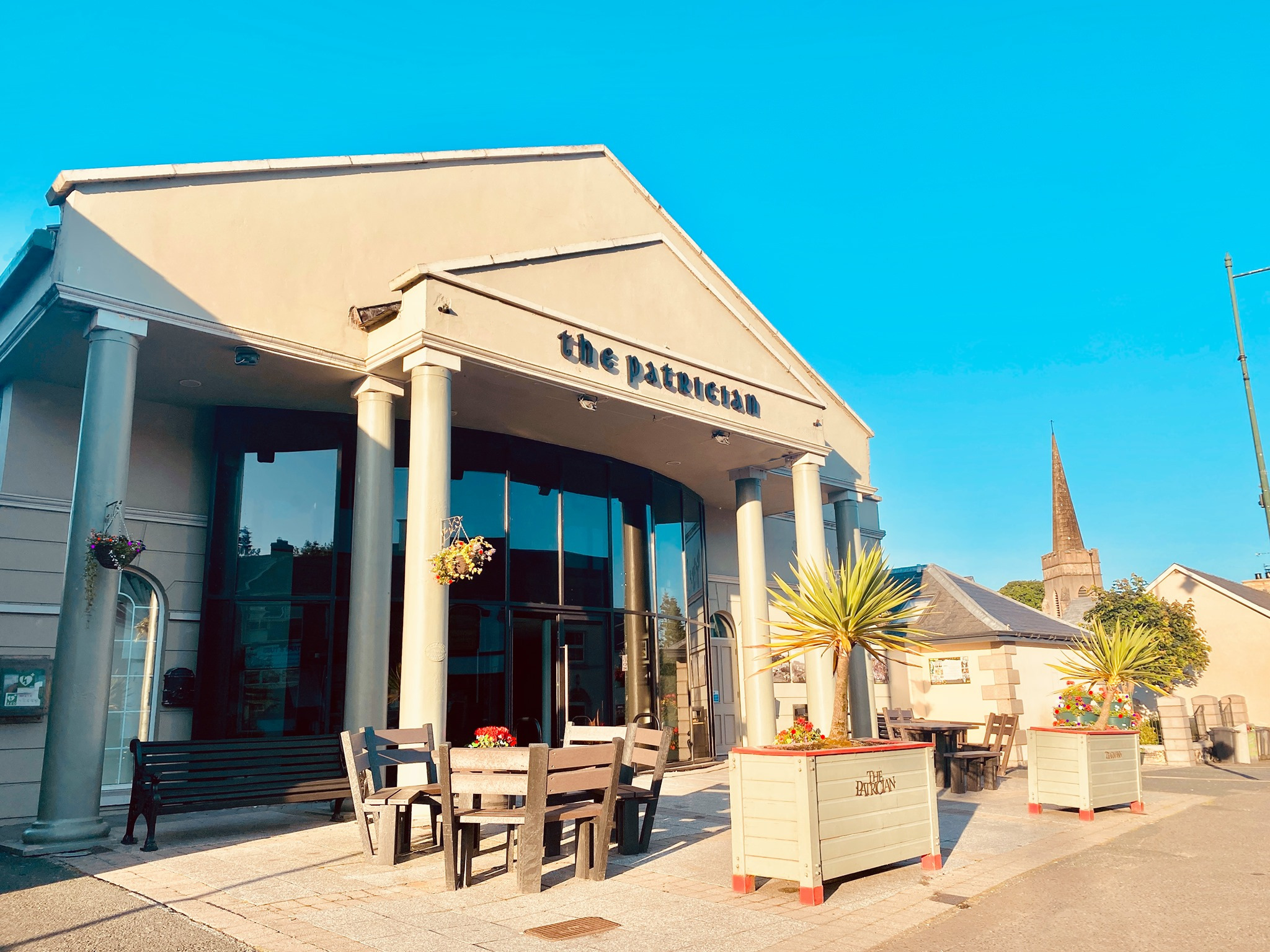
Main Street, Carrickmore, County Tyrone

The Patrician, otherwise known as The Patrician Hall, is a cultural, arts and entertainment venue in the village of Carrickmore, County Tyrone. It was built in 1962 as a means of raising money to build education facilities in the form of a primary and a post-primary school. The hall played host to many national and international stars including Liam Neeson, Roy Orbison, Val Doonican, The Wolfe Tones and The Dubliners. It was also very popular on the Irish Showband circuit throughout the 1960s and early 1970s. The venue continued to be used up until the millennium by local groups for events and fundraising.

== Renovation ==
In 2003, it closed for 18 months for major renovation work, with much of that work and funding coming from local volunteers as well as public bodies.

The Patrician reopened in 2005 with facilities including state-of-the-art lighting, sound and technical specifications; retractable seating, bar and food service, event and banquet. The venue is run by a charity called the Mid Ulster Community and Arts Trust (MUCAT), a 'not for profit' organisation made up of local volunteers who manage the venue. It continues to be used for a multitude of purposes and by a wide and varied section of the community.

Since its re-opening artists such as Francis Black, Johnny McEvoy, Philomena Begley, Ronnie Drew, Phelim Drew, Mick Moloney, Phil Coulter and Shane MacGowan have played in the venue. In 2006, The Patrician was featured in a BBC documentary regarding the Field Day Theatre Co. and Stephen Rea, actor of stage and screen revisited the hall to take part in this. In 2007 the President of Ireland, Mary McAleese, paid a visit as part of a tour of County Tyrone and unveiled a plaque in recognition of the new venue.

== Mid Ulster Drama Festival ==
For nine nights at the end of March, the Patrician hosts the Mid-Ulster festival of amateur drama, which showcases the best of amateur dramatics from groups throughout Ireland. The festival has been running since 1964 at the Patrician Hall.
