= Carrickmore =

Village in County Tyrone, Northern Ireland

Coordinates: 54°36′N 7°03′W

Carrickmore: Irish: An Charraig Mhór
- Village
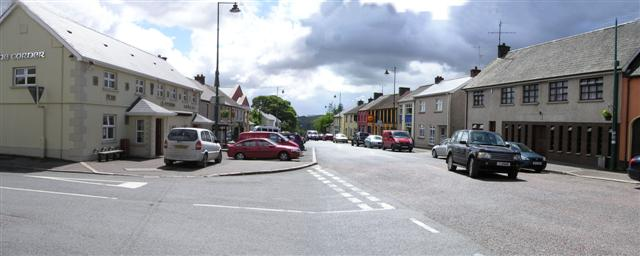

- Location within Northern Ireland
- Population: 625 (2021 census)
- Irish grid reference: H6172
  - Belfast: 52 mi (84 km)
- District: Fermanagh and Omagh
- County: County Tyrone
- Country: Northern Ireland
- Sovereign state: United Kingdom
- Post town: OMAGH
- Postcode district: BT79
- Dialling code: 028
- UK Parliament: West Tyrone
- NI Assembly: West Tyrone

Carrickmore (from Irish an Charraig Mhór, meaning 'the big rock') is a small village in County Tyrone, Northern Ireland. It is situated in the historic barony of Omagh East, the civil parish of Termonmaguirk and the Roman Catholic Parish of Termonmaguirc between Cookstown, Dungannon and Omagh. It had a population of 625 as of the 2021 census.

== History ==
The current settlement can trace its origins back thousands of years to the pre-Christian era. A wide range of historic monuments can be found in the Carrickmore area, including cairns, stone circles, standing stones and raths. It lies in the centre of the county on a raised site colloquially called "Carmen". An alias name for Carrickmore village is Termon Rock, Termonn being the first element of the parish name Termonmaguirk (Ir. Tearmann Mhig Oirc ‘McGurk’s sanctuary’) and rock referring to the rocky hill on which the village is situated. The McGurks were the Coarb family or hereditary lay custodians of the parish's church lands. The site of the former parish church is adjacent to the village of Carrickmore.

== Places of interest ==
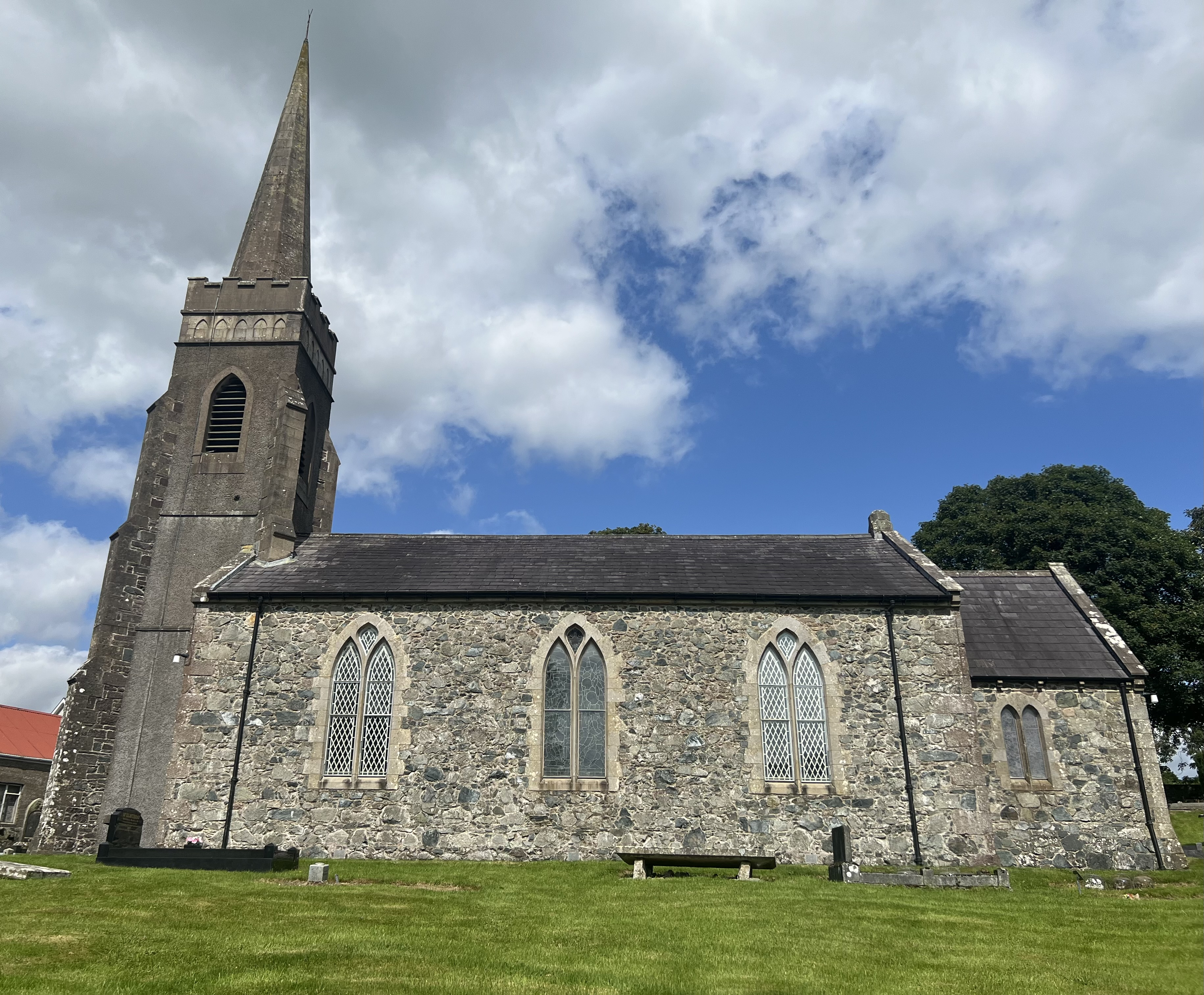
St Columbkille Church of Ireland, Carrickmore, where Kurt Cobain's ancestors married, and distant relatives are buried.

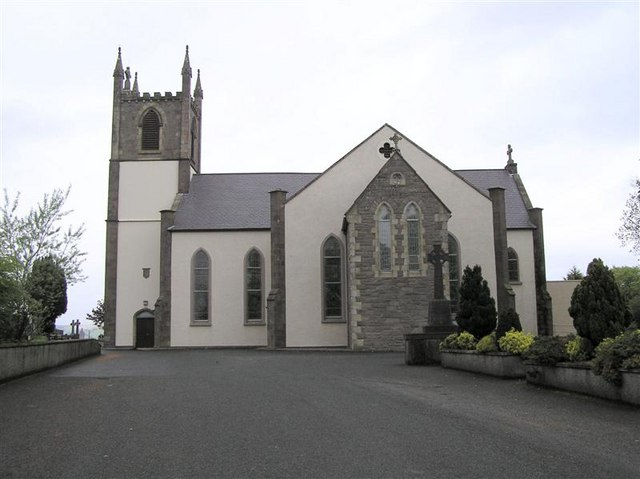
St Columbkille Roman Catholic church, Carrickmore.

- St Columbkille Church of Ireland: The present church building was completed in 1792, funded by a grant from the Board of First Fruits. On 18 April 1854, Samuel and Letitia Cobane, ancestors of musician Kurt Cobain, were married here. The tower was restored and a spire erected in 1861 to commemorate the late Rector, Rev C.C. Beresford. It serves the parish of Termonmaguirk and remains part of the Sixmilecross and Carrickmore group of parishes within the Diocese of Armagh. Several distant relatives of Cobain, from the Cobane/Cobain family line, are buried in the churchyard behind the building. The church stands on Termon Road, close to the town centre.
- Mullinalap Monastic Settlement: This early Christian settlement is located on the site of an older Celtic settlement. Pilgrims from across Ireland and Europe came to this site to seek spiritual renewal and cures from ailments as water from a well at the site was reputed to have healing power. Saint Colmcille founded a monastery here in 550AD, with rock formations forming a bed and chair being named after the Saint. Situated on the hill beside St Colmcille's Roman Catholic Church, Creggan Road.
- Dunmisk Fort: It is assumed to be one of the few industrial centres of Ireland during prehistoric times. The site is hugely significant in that it is the first evidence for glass-making to be published for Early Christian Ireland. It shows that both glass-making and glass-working occurred, and therefore that not all glass was imported. Evidence was found there during an archaeology survey in the 1980s. It was also discovered that the site was home to a complex monastic settlement and a cemetery of over 400 graves. Accessed from the main Galbally to Carrickmore Road (Inishatieve Road).
- Relignaman: The name Relignaman comes from the Irish relig na mban, meaning women’s graveyard. It is a small sub-rectangular enclosure, approximately 19m across, surrounded by a grass covered stony bank, some with decoration. According to local tradition, it is located sufficiently far from St Colmcille’s church in Carrickmore so as the ringing of the bell will not wake the dead. Another tradition is that the saint decreed that no living woman or dead man should enter it, with another possibility being that it was a burial ground for a women's religious community. It probably dates to the early Christian period. The site can be accessed from both Quarry Road and Drumnakilly Road.
- Creggandevesky Court Tomb: Built between 5000 and 6000 years ago in the late Stone Age, the chamber served as a tomb, and the courtyard to accommodate a ritual. This cairn was up to ten feet high, wedge shaped and diminishes in size from its front. It faces Lough Mallon to the southeast and has a deep court leading to a gallery which is divided into three chambers. Objects were often buried with the deceased, as the first neolithic people of this time believed in life after death. During excavations in 1979 and 1982 the remains of 21 individuals, pottery sherds, flint tools and a necklace of 112 stone beads were found. Accessed from the Loughmallon road, four miles from Carrickmore. Another nearby neolithic site, Cregganconroe, contains two stone circles, two cairns and a stone alignment.
- Patrician Hall: A community, culture, arts and multi-purpose venue in the centre of the village. It was renowned across Ireland as one of the top venues for showbands in the 1960s and 1970s. Van Morrison, Roy Orbison, Liam Neeson, Seamus Heaney, Brian Friel, Dolores Keane, Shane MacGowan, and many other international personalities have appeared. It also hosts the annual Mid-Ulster Drama Festival every March as well as other festivals and events throughout the year. A small plaque is erected to the Cobane/Cobain family outside the hall.
- The National Graves Monument: A memorial to republicans killed during the Anglo-Irish conflict. It is located at the junction of Drumnakilly Road and Mullanmore Road, close to the town centre.. On Easter Sunday 1916, 60 men mobilised in Carrickmore in anticipation of the Easter Rising.
- Bernish Glen: Located on the edge of the Parish of Termonmaguirc in the townland of Cavanreagh, this geological feature is an impressive landmark on the local countryside. The renowned local highwayman Shane Bernagh Donnelly is said to have taken his name from the Glen after jumping across it on horseback escaping from English soldiers. It was made famous by Poets John Montague and WF Marshall. The area is well known for its bilberries - known locally as 'blaeberries' or 'fraughan' - which would be picked annually at the Blaeberry Sunday festival on the last Sunday in July.
- Tree of Fortune (from Irish Crann na deis, meaning 'tree of chance or opportunity'): An old tree located beneath Mullinalap Monastic Settlement. There are several variations on this story with local custom saying that beneath it is a portal to the otherworld e.g. Mag Mell. Oral tradition has it that the Fear Dubh or dark man (i.e. malevolent spirit) would appear at the site and play a betting game with mortals, if they won their wishes would be granted, if they lost then their souls were his for eternity. The spirit was eventually banished by the Tuatha Dé Danann led by Lugh forcing it into the portal and sealing the entrance by planting a tree on top of it. Lugh was said to declare the area a sanctuary from the spirit and it is believed this is how the locality received the name Termon or Tearmann. It is said the tree is now guarded by the Aos Sí, the descendants of the Tuatha Dé Danann. It was believed that each time the tree dies the entrance can reopen and the Fear Dubh may return to play its game. A local brewery was named after the tree.
- High Cross The cross to celebrate Jubilee 2000, a Roman Catholic celebration in the year 2000. It sits in an area known as Fód na Marbh (sod of the dead) beside St Columbkilles R.C. Church. Made of stone and standing 24 feet high it features carved scenes from the lives of Irish saints. It has a 21st-century depiction of the historic moment when Pope John Paul II inserted a prayer of reconciliation into the Western Wall in Jerusalem during his pilgrimage to the Holy Land in March 2000. Some of the cross's other motifs and panels include: The Nativity, the Crucifixion and the Resurrection, The Assumption of Our Lady, Christ preaching the Beatitudes, the Miracle of the Loaves and Fishes, the three patrons of Ireland – Ss. Patrick, Brigid and Columcille, St Oliver Plunkett, St Teresa of the Child Jesus, St Malachy, an emigrant boat, the sacraments and family life, the Archbishop of Armagh's coat of arms and the motif of the papal visit to Ireland in 1979.
- Quinns Corner: On the corner of Main Street and Creggan Road, this elevated platform in the centre of the village (formerly a Hotel and latterly a Public House) was the setting for speeches given by many prominent political figures, including Michael Davitt, Roger Casement, Constance Markievicz, Éamon de Valera, Gerry Adams, Tomás Mac Giolla, Liam Kelly and Bernadette Devlin. It is also the place the local sporting teams return to after winning contests. It now lies derelict.
- The Nally Stand: During the redevelopment of GAA headquarters at Croke Park in Dublin, one of the stands surrounding the pitch was transported to Carrickmore and is now situated in its GAA ground.
- Carrickmore Airfield: Small airfield on the edge of Carrickmore offering flying lessons and pleasure flights over the local countryside. Run by the local C-More Flying club, it hosts annual fun days for the community which include 'Fly-In's' by aircraft from all over Ireland and Britain including the Irish Coast Guard Helicopter.

== Transport ==
Carrickmore is served by Ulsterbus route 86, which runs between Dungannon and Omagh via Dungannon, Donaghmore, Pomeroy, Carrickmore, Drumnakilly and Omagh.

The Portadown, Dungannon and Omagh Junction Railway opened Carrickmore railway station on 2 September 1861. The Ulster Transport Authority closed the station on 5 October 1959 and the line on 15 February 1965.

== Geography ==
The townlands that make up the area of Carrickmore border on the parishes of Ballygawley, Beragh, Galbally, Kildress, Kileeshil, Pomeroy. Carrickmore also shares the parish of Termonmagurk with Loughmacrory and Creggan. Carrickmore has the smallest townland in Ireland known as Old Church Yard.

=== Carrickmore townland ===
The townland of Carrickmore is situated in the historic barony of Omagh East and the civil parish of Termonmaguirk and covers an area of 915 acres.

The population of the townland declined during the 19th century:

Year	1841	1851	1861	1871	1881	1891
Population	258	234	240	230	219	178
Houses	54	47	44	43	40	38

In 1891 the town of Carrickmore (formerly Termon Rock) stood in the townland of Carrickmore, with an estimated area of 11 acres.

The townland contains two Scheduled Historic Monuments: Graveyard: Relignaman or Relicknaman and Graveyard: Relignalaniv.

== Sport ==
Carrickmore St Colmcille's (Gaelic football club) and Éire Óg Carrickmore (hurling and camogie club) are the two main sporting organisations in the village. Carrickmore also has a proud boxing tradition, with national-level success, and supports a range of community sporting activities, including walking, running, cycling, and inclusive programmes.

== Demography ==
Carrickmore is classified as a town by the NI Statistics and Research Agency (NISRA) (i.e. with a population between 500 and 1,000). On census day 2011:

- 99.48% were from the white (including Irish Traveller) ethnic group;
- 95.67% belong to or were brought up in the Catholic religion and 3.78% belong to or were brought up in a 'Protestant and Other Christian (including Christian related)' religion; and
- 6.57% indicated that they had a British national identity, 67.98% had an Irish national identity and 27.90% had a Northern Irish national identity.

== Notable people ==
Carrickmore is the ancestral home of Kurt Cobain, lead singer and guitarist of the band Nirvana. Samuel and Letitia Cobane left the townland of Inishatieve in 1875, first emigrating to Canada before later settling in Washington. Kurt was a fifth-generation descendant of the emigrants.

Two historical figures from the Clan na Gael and Irish Republican Brotherhood hailed from the Carrickmore area: Joseph McGarrity who helped fund the 1916 Easter Rising and Patrick McCartan.

The Dean Brian Maguirc College, a second-level education school, is named for Dean Brian McGurk, a native of Carrickmore who served as Vicar-General to St Oliver Plunkett during the Penal Times and died in Armagh Gaol, aged 91.

== See also ==
- List of villages in Northern Ireland
- List of townlands of County Tyrone
- List of archaeological sites in County Tyrone
