= Cavanakeeran =

Townland in County Tyrone, Northern Ireland

Coordinates: 54.595°N 6.938°W

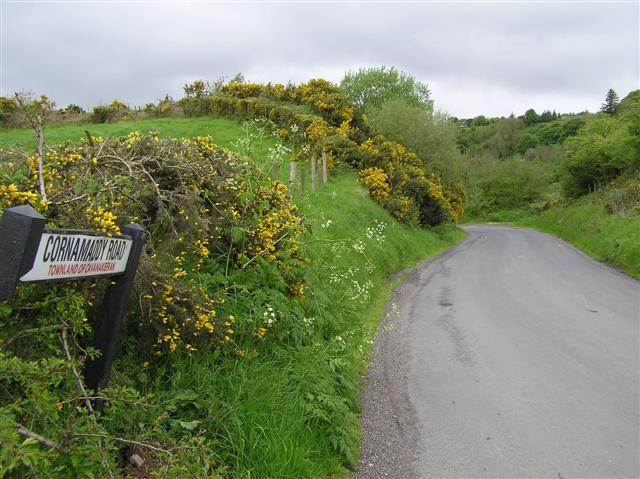
Cornamaddy Road in Cavanakeeran townland, 2006

Cavanakeeran (Irish: Cabhan an Chaorthainn (Hill of the rowan tree)) is a townland in County Tyrone, Northern Ireland. It is situated in the historic barony of Dungannon Middle and the civil parish of Pomeroy and covers an area of 894 acres. The town of Pomeroy itself is situated in Cavanakeeran.

The area comprising Cavanakeeran is countryside with an agricultural population largely involved in raising livestock. One main feature is the Church of the Assumption situated in Pomeroy. Cavanakeeran is bordered by Limehill and Gortnagarn.

The population of the townland declined during the 19th century:

Year	1841	1851	1861	1871	1881	1891
Population	317	264	255	227	201	193
Houses	55	48	45	49	46	41

In 1891, the town of Pomeroy which stands in Cavanakeeran townland, was estimated to have an area of 21 acres.

== See also ==
- List of townlands of County Tyrone
- Pomeroy, County Tyrone
