= Mountains of Pomeroy =

Mountain range in Northern Ireland

Coordinates: 54.593°N 6.996°W

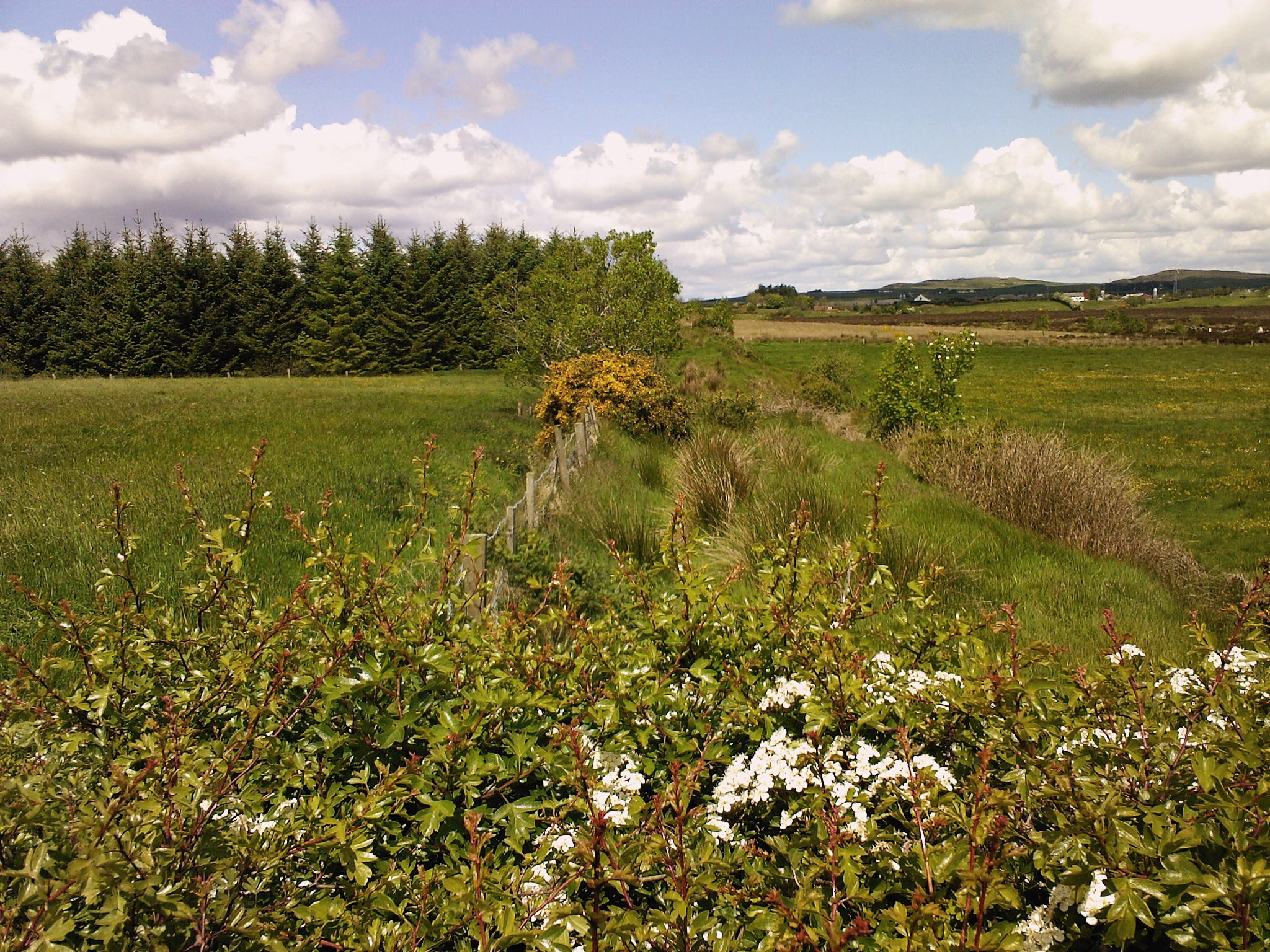
View towards the Mountains of Pomeroy from Altmore

Mountains of Pomeroy are a mountain range that runs west of the town of Pomeroy in County Tyrone, Northern Ireland. The area around the mountain range is scenic, with a variety of moorland, forestry and rural farming. The mountain range is recalled in the ballad The Mountains of Pomeroy by Dr. George Sigerson, the Anthem of Tyrone GAA.
