= Priest hunter =

Job in England during Penal Times

A priest hunter was a person who, acting on behalf of the English and later British government, spied on or captured Catholic priests during Penal Times. Priest hunters were effectively bounty hunters. Some were volunteers, experienced soldiers or former spies.

== England ==
Elizabeth I reinstated the Protestant Bible and English Mass, yet for a number of years, she refrained from persecuting Catholics. After the Rising of the North of 1569 and the papal bull Regnans in Excelsis (1570), plus the threat of invasion by Catholic France or Spain assisted by English Catholics, the Crown was led to adopt ever-increasing repressive measures.

The Bulls, etc., from Rome Act 1571 not only forbade the publishing of any documents from the Pope, but also the importation and distribution of crosses, beads, pictures, and tokens called "Agnus Dei" (a Lamb of God sealed upon a piece of wax from the Paschal candle blessed by the Pope). From the 1570s, missionary priests from continental seminaries came to England secretly. In the autumn of 1577, Queen Elizabeth's Principal Secretary, Francis Walsingham canvassed the Anglican bishops for a list of recusants in their dioceses and how much each was worth. Cuthbert Mayne (1544–1577) was the first English Catholic "seminary priest" to be executed under the laws of Elizabeth I.

The Religion Act 1580 fined and imprisoned those who celebrated the Mass or attended a Mass. The Jesuits, etc. Act 1584 commanded all Catholic priests to leave the country in forty days or be punished for high treason unless, within the 40 days, they swore an oath to obey the queen. Those who harboured them, and all those who knew of their presence and failed to inform the authorities, would be fined and imprisoned for felony. It also provided an incentive to informers by according them one-third of any forfeitures.

This Act was followed by another, the Jesuits, etc. Act 1584, which declared that anyone ordained a priest outside the queen's dominions who then came into the country was deemed a traitor, and anyone harbouring them, a felon. Nicholas Woodfen (Devereux) and Edward Stransham, who had both studied at the English College, Douai, were executed at Tyburn on 21 January 1586.

One of the most infamous priest hunters of Elizabeth's reign was Sir Richard Topcliffe, who delighted in personally torturing and playing mind games with the priests whom he apprehended. Described by John Gerard as "old and hoary and a veteran in evil", Topcliffe ultimately fell from favour with the queen and was imprisoned very soon after his role in the arrest, trial, and execution of the underground priest and secret poet, Robert Southwell.

=== Methods ===
Walsingham tracked down Catholic priests in England and supposed conspirators by employing informers and intercepting correspondence. Shortly before setting off for England, Edmund Campion learned that a letter detailing their party and mission had been intercepted and that they were expected in England. It was a common practice for a spy to pose as a Catholic and engage a suspect in conversation in the hope of eliciting an incriminating statement. This technique led to the arrest and execution of Richard Simpson in 1588.

Apostate Catholics, former priests and seminarians were particularly helpful in this regard. A London priest hunter named Sledd had been a servant to Nicholas Morton at the English College in Rome. After George Haydock had been betrayed to Sledd by one of Haydock's old acquaintances, Sledd went to the house where Haydock took his meals, and recognized the priest Arthur Pitts and law student William Jenneson.

=== George Eliot ===
In early July 1581, John Payne, while staying on the estate of Lady Petre in Warwickshire, was denounced by informer George Eliot, a spy in the employ of Robert Dudley, 1st Earl of Leicester. Eliot became a spy, agreeing to seek out recusant Catholics, in order to avoid a pending murder charge. He had insinuated himself into a position in the Petre household where he then proceeded to embezzle sums of money.

Eliot followed that success shortly thereafter with the capture of Edmund Campion, who had arrived in London on 24 June 1580 disguised as a jewel merchant. Eliot used his past experience working in a Catholic household to gain admittance to a Mass Campion was saying at Lyford Grange in Oxfordshire. Elliot then returned with an armed company and searched the house until they discovered the priest hole where Campion and two associates were hiding.

=== Wadsworth et al ===
Informants were embedded within Catholic communities. Starting in the 1640s, James Wadsworth, Francis Newton, Thomas Mayo, and Robert de Luke formed a partnership to hunt down Catholics in the London area and handed them over to the authorities for a reward. Between November 1640 and the summer of 1651 over fifty individuals were turned over to the government. Some were executed, some banished, and some reprieved.

=== Worsley (John) and Newell (William) ===
In 1592-3 they searched several houses in the Midlands, including Thomas Lygon's at Elkstone in Gloucestershire. On 26 December 1593 they searched the Wisemans' dower-house at Northend, and they led the famous search of Braddocks in April 1594 that John Gerard (Jesuit) describes in his autobiography, and arrested Gerard and Nicholas Owen in Holborn a few weeks later.

== Ireland ==
=== Elizabethan era ===
During the Elizabethan era in Dublin, Lord Justices Adam Loftus and Sir Henry Wallop took a leading role in coercing Thomas Fleming, 10th Baron Slane to carry out the arrest and delivery to Dublin Castle of Dermot O'Hurley, the Roman Catholic Archbishop of Cashel.

=== The Restoration ===
Around 1680, persecution of Catholics heated up in reaction to Titus Oates' claims of a non-existent Catholic conspiracy aimed at assassinating King Charles II. As a result, a Catholic priest named Fr. Mac Aidghalle was killed while saying mass at a mass rock that still stands atop Slieve Gullion, in County Armagh. The perpetrators were a company of soldiers under the command of a priest hunter named Turner. Redmond O'Hanlon, the outlawed but de facto Chief of the Name of Clan O'Hanlon and leading local rapparee, is said in local oral tradition to have avenged the murdered priest and in so doing to have sealed his own fate.

=== Popery Act ===
A 1709 Penal Act demanded that Catholic priests take the Oath of Abjuration, and recognise the Protestant Queen Anne as Supreme Head of the Church within all her dominions, and declare that Catholic doctrine regarding Transubstantiation to be "base and idolatrous". Priests who refused to take the oath abjuring the Catholic faith were arrested and executed. This activity, along with the deportation of priests who did conform, was a documented attempt to cause the Catholic clergy to die out in Ireland within a generation. Priests had to register with the local magistrates to be allowed to preach, and most did so. Bishops were not permitted to register.

In 1713, the Irish House of Commons declared that "prosecution and informing against Papists was an honourable service", which revived the Elizabethan era profession of priest hunting. The reward rates for capture varied from £50–100 for a bishop, to £10–20 for the capture of an unregistered priest: substantial amounts of money at the time.

According to D.P. Conyngham, "The priest-hunters were now called into full activity, and for some thirty years pursued their lethal trade in full force. Each of these wretches had under him an infamous corps, called priest-hounds, whose duty was to track, with the untiring scent of the bloodhound, the humble priest from refuge to refuge. In cities and towns the Catholic clergy were concealed in cellars or garrets, and in the country districts they were hid in unfrequented caves, in the lonely woods, or in the huts of the Irish peasantry. De Burgo tells us that this persecution and hunting of priests was most bitter towards the close of Anne's reign and the commencement of George I; and he says that none would have escaped were it not for the horror in which priest-catchers were held by the people, Protestants as well as Catholics."

Thomas Burgos wrote in the Hibernia Dominica (1762): "Eager for blood money, with some Orange magistrate or landlord whose creed was hatred of papists as their master, accompanied by bands of soldiers, the priest-hounds hunted God's ministers night and day. A race of men whose love of money and hatred of Christianity peculiarly fitted them for the work, were employed to chase priests out of their hiding places, and drag them from their lurking holes. These agents of persecution assumed the garb of priests and went through the ceremonies of the Catholic religion. They thus wormed themselves into the confidence of the unwary, from whom they learned the names and haunts of concealed priests. Thus the clergy were tracked to their most secret retreats, and dragged sometimes from the very altar, robed in their sacred vestments, before tribunals, which sentenced them to perpetual banishment."

The work was dangerous, and some priests fought back, as Fr. David Burke of County Mayo did against John O'Mullowney, and killed priest hunters while "resisting arrest". Another risk for priest hunters was revenge killings by slain priests' relatives. The hunters were outcasts in their communities, and were viewed as the most despised class. Often when someone arrested or killed a priest, local rapparees would retaliate by killing priest hunters or soldiers they worked with.

According to historian William P. Burke, "Country gentlemen except when labouring under great political excitement or when religious bigotry obscured their judgment, however desirous they might be to rid the country of priests, were reluctant to harass their Catholic neighbours by inquisitions under the Act, 8 Anne. Hence the discovering and prosecuting of priests was carried out in large part by men who travelled the country for that purpose and were hired by grand juries or the Dublin executive. Pursued by the execrations of the people, traditions of these men still live, and there are few localities that do not preserve the memory of some (Irish: Seán na tSagart)."

Around 1717, Fr. Garcia, a Catholic priest from an allegedly Converso family in Cádiz, arrived in Ireland via England and joined the underground Roman Catholic Archdiocese of Dublin. His credentials were accepted by the underground Archbishop, but in November 1717, Garcia voluntarily read aloud the Oath of Abjuration inside a Church of Ireland parish and, in a resulting series of mass arrests, the government apprehended, "the provincial of the Dominicans, two Jesuits, one Franciscan, and three secular priests." "Owing to the severe persecution", Archbishop Edmund Byrne, however, was kept very well hidden even from his priestly subordinates and, as Garcia never knew how to recognize him, the outlawed Archbishop managed to escape arrest. In return, the government awarded Garcia a bounty of £120 and temporarily granted him lodgings inside Dublin Castle.

In his native Spain, Garcia's mother was reportedly so distressed to learn of her son's actions, "by means of the Irish papists who live in Cádiz, [that she] is so far from helping him that she would join with the Inquisition to burn him alive and in so doing she would believe to do God service." Even so, the government repeatedly denied Garcia's pleas for more money and the Anglican Communion repeatedly denied his requests to be made Vicar of a parish. The last mention of Garcia that appears in government documents from the era explains that as of 15 February 1723, the authorities had recommended him as a Protestant missionary in British-ruled Minorca, but it remains unknown whether he ever went there.

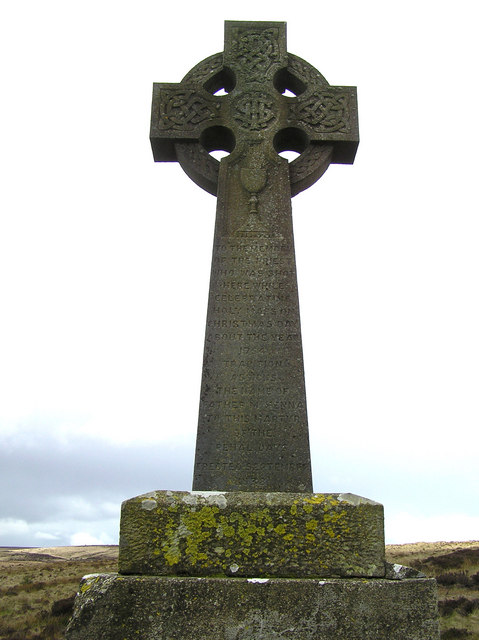
Bragan Penal Cross, alias Leacht a 'tSagairt, Slieve Beagh, County Monaghan.

In the Slieve Beagh mountains of County Monaghan, a large Celtic cross now tops a Mass rock known as Leacht a 'tSagairt ("The Priest's Flagstone"). The bullet hole in the altar below the cross is said in the local oral tradition to mark where a priest hunter shot a Fr. McKenna while he was saying Mass there on Christmas Day, c. 1754. The priest hunter was assassinated soon afterwards in nearby Emyvale by local rapparee leader and folk hero Shane Bernagh. Another oral tradition version of the same events credits the killing to a Yeomanry unit from Clogher and gives the slain priest's name as Father Milligan. The same source also alleges that Shane Bernagh, after learning almost immediately afterwards of the priest's murder while in hiding nearby, "swore that he would have a Yeoman's life for this". Bernagh and his band of rapparees are then alleged to have ambushed the Yeomanry during their return to barracks, killed one of them, and thrown the body into Lough More.

O'Mullowney, of Derrew in the Partry Mountains of County Mayo was perhaps the most notorious. He was an alcoholic and horse thief who took up the profession in return for a pardon from the hangman's noose, c. 1715. In 1726, he was killed by Fr. David Burke, a priest he was pursuing, and his body was thrown in a lake; it was recovered and buried at Ballintubber Abbey.

Even if they could not kill the priest hunter, local Irish Catholics even would seek revenge by burning down his house and farmyard. The risks were the same for known informants. The distribution of priest hunters was uneven; some local police forces chose to overlook both the presence of priests and their activity at Mass rocks. The penal laws imposed outlawry upon the remaining clerics, and they were forced to say Mass in secret, and in remote locations. High-risk worship at Mass rocks became common. The attending priest would usually wear a veil, so that if an attendee was questioned, they were able to say truthfully that they did not know who had said the Mass.

According to Tony Nugent, the last killing of a priest at a Mass rock took place at Inse an tSagairt, near Bonane, County Kerry in the year 1829. A local woman, who ran a shebeen at Glengarriff, reputedly conspired with five local men to kill the priest and split the £45 bounty among themselves. After capturing the priest during Mass, beheading him inside a house at Killowen near Kenmare, and bringing his severed head to Cork City, the six conspirators learned that Catholic Emancipation had just been signed into law and that no reward would be given. In frustration, the six priest hunters threw the severed head into the River Lee.

== See also ==
- Forty Martyrs of England and Wales
- Irish Catholic Martyrs
- List of Catholic martyrs of the English Reformation § Decrees of Elizabeth I
- List of obsolete occupations

== Sources ==
- de Burca, Eamon. South Mayo Family Research Centre Journal, 1987.
- McGee, Thomas D'Arcy. The priest hunter : a tale of the Irish penal laws, 1844.
- Power, Denis. Archaeological inventory of County Cork, Volume 3: Mid Cork, 9467. ColorBooks, 1997. ISBN 0-7076-4933-1
