= Bonane =

Village in County Kerry, Ireland

Bonane An Bunán
- Village
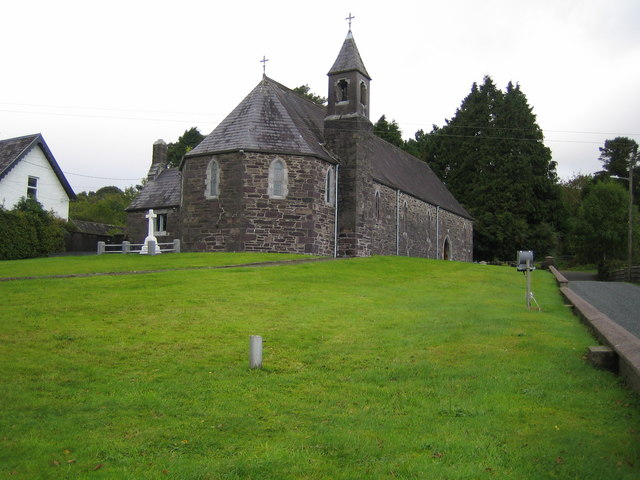
- Catholic church in Bonane

- Location in Ireland
- Coordinates: 51°48′56″N 9°32′17″W
- Country: Ireland
- Province: Munster
- County: County Kerry
- Irish grid reference: V939637

Bonane or Bunane (Irish: An Bunán) is a small village in County Kerry, Ireland, approximately 10 kilometres from Kenmare. It is within the Sheen River valley, between the Sheehy and Caha Mountains. The area is home to a number of archaeological sites.

== History ==
=== Prehistory ===
Evidence of ancient settlement in the area includes a number of ringfort, stone circle, bullaun, souterrain and hut sites in the surrounding townlands of Milleens and Deelis.

=== Ecclesiastical sites ===
Historically associated with Saint Fiachna, there are a number of ecclesiastical sites around Bonane, including a Mass rock at Inse an tSagairt in Innisfoyle townland.

In his 2013 book on Mass rocks, Tony Nugent includes a story about the last killing of a Roman Catholic priest at a Mass rock, which reputedly took place at the Inse an tSagairt site in 1829. According to the story, described in other sources as a "strong folk belief" or "local legend", a woman, who ran a shebeen at nearby Glengarriff, conspired with five local men to kill a priest and split the £45 bounty. After capturing the priest during Mass, beheading him inside a house at Killowen near Kenmare, and bringing his severed head to Cork city, the six conspirators learned that Catholic Emancipation had just been signed into law and that no reward would be given. In the folktale, the six priest hunters reputedly threw the severed head into the River Lee in frustration.

The nearby parish church at Sheana-Shéipéil, described as having "tottering walls" and a "confined unsafe cabin" in 1839, was replaced with a new structure at Milleens in the mid-19th century. The present church, dedicated to Saint Fiachna, was built on the same site in 1892.

== Amenities ==
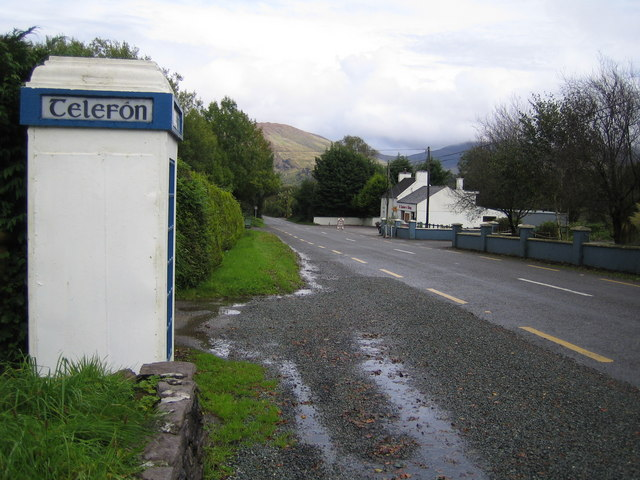
Old phone box in Bonane

Tourist sites in the area include Bonane Heritage Park, a chocolate factory and traditional farm and visitors centre.

St. Fiachna's Church (built 1892) is in the centre of the village, while Bonane's national (primary) school is located at Tulloha.

== Transport ==
Bonane lies on the N71 national route between Glengarriff and Kenmare.

While Bus Éireann route 270 (from Killarney to Skibbereen) passes through the village, there is no official bus stop. A TFI Local Link service, which must be prebooked, runs every Wednesday and on the second Saturday of the month.
