= Slieve Beagh =

Mountain on the border of country of Ireland and Northern Ireland

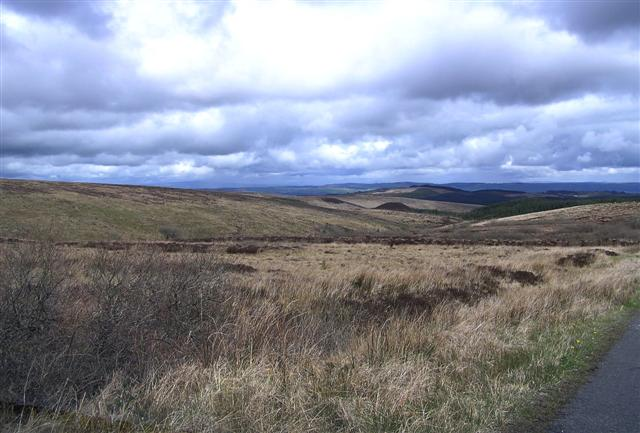
- Bragan Townland Looking northwards

Highest point
- Elevation: 380 m (1,250 ft)
- Prominence: 285 m (935 ft)
- Listing: County Top (Monaghan), Marilyn
- Coordinates: 54.319°N 7.253°W

Naming
- English translation: mountain of birch
- Language of name: Irish

Geography
- Location within Northern Ireland
- Location: County Monaghan, County Fermanagh, County Tyrone
- Parent range: Fermanagh/Tyrone Mountains
- OSI/OSNI grid: H523436

Ramsar Wetland
- Official name: Slieve Beagh
- Designated: 28 July 2000
- Reference no.: 1035

Slieve Beagh (/ˈsliːv beɪ/ SLEEV-bay; Irish: Sliabh Beatha) is a mountainous area straddling the border between County Monaghan in the Republic of Ireland and County Fermanagh and County Tyrone in Northern Ireland. A point just east of its summit is the highest point in Monaghan; however the true summit is on the Fermanagh-Tyrone border. The point where the three counties meet, is referred to as the "Three County Hollow".

== Name ==
The original Irish name for the area is Sliabh Beatha, which has been anglicised to Slieve Beagh, but sometimes the two languages are combined to form Sliabh Beagh. According to Irish mythology, the name refers to the mythological figure Bith, who was buried in a cairn on top of the mountain. Although the summit is in fact marked by a cairn, called Doocarn, it is likely that the name's original meaning is "mountain of birch". In County Monaghan, the locals typically refer to the Slieve Beagh as the "Bragan Mountains", taking the name from a townland within the Slieve Beagh.

== Geography ==
Slieve Beagh has many low, smooth summits. The highest is at 380 metres (1,250 ft) and lies just inside County Fermanagh. The area is mainly blanket bog, with many small lakes and streams throughout. In Northern Ireland, much of Slieve Beagh has been designated as a Special Area of Conservation. The Finn River rises on the slopes of Slieve Beagh.

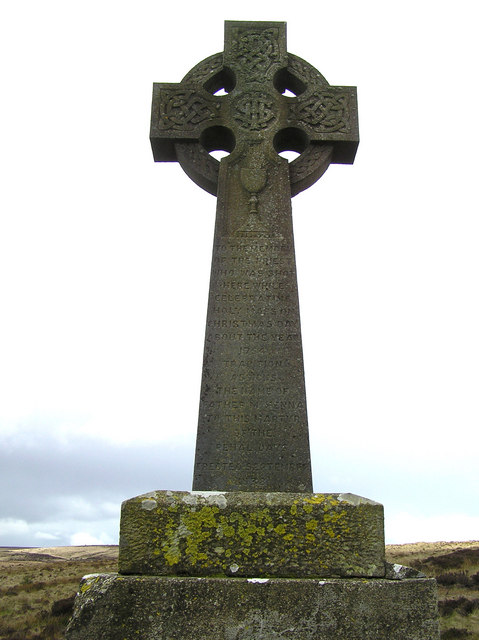
Bragan Penal Cross, alias Leacht a 'tSagairt.

A large Celtic cross now tops a Mass rock known as Leacht a 'tSagairt ("The Priest's Flagstone") is said in the local oral tradition to mark where a priest hunter shot a Fr. McKenna while saying Mass there on Christmas Day, c.1754. The priest hunter was assassinated soon afterwards near Emyvale by local rapparee leader and folk hero Shane Bernagh. Another oral tradition version of the same events credits the killing to an Yeomanry unit from Clogher and gives the slain priest's name as Father Milligan. The same source also alleges that Shane Bernagh, after learning almost immediately afterwards of the priest's murder while in hiding nearby, "swore that he would have a Yeoman's life for this". Bernagh and his band of rapparees are then alleged to have ambushed the Yeomanry during their return to barracks, killed one of them, and thrown the body into Lough More.

== Ramsar site ==
The Slieve Beagh Ramsar site (wetlands of international importance designated under the Ramsar Convention), is 1884.68 hectares in area, at latitude 54 20 53 N and longitude 07 11 38 W. It was designated a Ramsar site on 14 December 1999. The Ramsar site boundary coincides entirely with that of the Slieve Beagh Area of Special Scientific Interest and the Slieve Beagh Special Area of Conservation.

Vegetation is characterized by sphagnum mosses and ericoid dwarf-shrubs.

== See also ==
- Cuilcagh
- Lists of mountains in Ireland
- List of Irish counties by highest point
- List of mountains of the British Isles by height
- List of Marilyns in the British Isles
