= Sean na Sagart =

Irish bounty hunter and priest killer

Seán na Sagart (Irish for 'John of the Priests'), born John Mullowney (c. 1690 – 1726), was a priest hunter during penal times in Ireland.

John Mullowney was born in Derrew, near Ballyheane, County Mayo, c. 1690. Mullowney was a horse thief and was arrested and sentenced to death in Castlebar in his youth. When the grand jury became aware of his low character, they cut a deal with him in which he agreed to turn priest hunter to escape the hangman's noose. The 1709 Penal Act demanded that Catholic priests take the Oath of Abjuration and recognise the Protestant Queen Anne as Supreme Head of the Church of England and Ireland. Any cleric who refused was sentenced to death by the Anglican-controlled judicial system.

Mullowney was reputedly offered £100 for capturing an archbishop or bishop, £20 for a priest, and £10 for obtaining a hedge school teacher. These men would then be executed if they refused to take the Oath of Abjuration. Mullowney used the money to fund his heavy drinking and expensive tastes. One technique used by him was to pretend to be sick and close to death. He would then call for a priest to hear his confession. When a priest would arrive, Mullowney would grab a knife hidden under the bedclothes and attempt to capture or kill his confessor. According to some accounts in the Irish Folklore Commission's "School's Collection", after receiving a bounty for the heads of his victims, Mullowney would dispose of them in a lake.

Mullowney was a deeply unpopular individual, and hated by all. His activities continued until he had killed all but two of the area's priests. The last two knew well who he was and lived in disguise. But Mullowney discovered one of the last two and killed him. He expected that the last remaining priest would attend that funeral, which he did, dressed as a woman. The priest's disguise did not fool Mullowney, who attacked him at the funeral. Unlike other priests who had been ambushed by someone who they thought was dying, this priest was expecting an attack and fought back. He was able to hold off and injure Mullowney before a second man, reputedly known as John McCann, fatally stabbed Mullowney. He reputed to have died in 1726 near Partry in County Mayo and is said to have been buried in the graveyard at Ballintubber Abbey.

A fictionalised account of Mullowney's life, written by Matthew Archdeacon, was published by James Duffy in 1844.
