= Pomeroy, County Tyrone =

Coordinates: 54.59°N 6.93°W

Pomeroy: Irish: Cabhán a' Chaorthainn; Scots: Aipplescaw
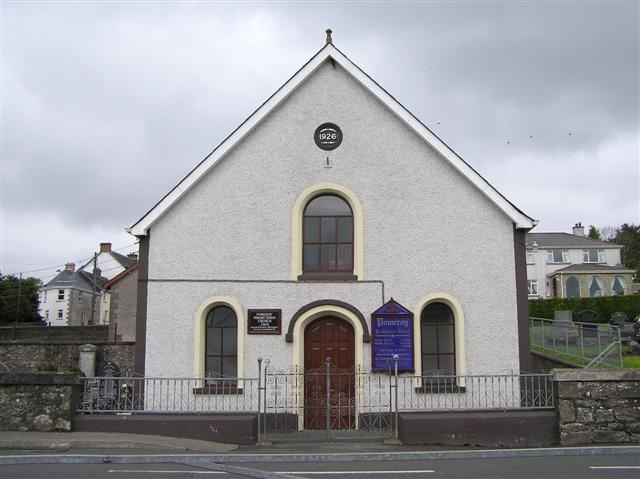
- Pomeroy Presbyterian Church

- Location within Northern Ireland
- Population: 788 (2011 Census)
- District: Cookstown
- County: County Tyrone
- Country: Northern Ireland
- Sovereign state: United Kingdom
- Post town: Dungannon
- Postcode district: BT70
- Dialling code: 028
- UK Parliament: Mid Ulster
- NI Assembly: Mid Ulster

Pomeroy is a small village and civil parish in County Tyrone, Northern Ireland. It is in the townland of Cavanakeeran, about 8.5 miles (14 km) from Cookstown, 9 miles (14 km) from Dungannon and 16 miles (26 km) from Omagh. The 2011 Census recorded a population of 788 people.

Pomeroy is atop a large hill that dominates the surrounding countryside. From the Cookstown end, the road through the village gradually climbs a gradient up to a village square, The Diamond. The village is surrounded by the Pomeroy Hills. The surrounding countryside is a mixture of moorland and bog land. Stone age and Bronze Age cairns dot the landscape. Pomeroy is the closest settlement to the geographical centre of Ulster.

== History ==
At the end of the 17th century there was no village in this area, just an extensive forest. In the plantation of Ulster James I and VI granted eight townlands to Sir William Parsons, Surveyor General of Ireland. In 1729 James Lowry inherited the land from his father, Robert of Aghenis Caledon.

In the 18th century two new parishes were created in Tyrone, and the same family, the Lowrys (from whom issued the Earls of Belmore), was involved in the establishment of both. Pomeroy was created from part of Donaghmore, while Clogherny was taken from Termonmaguirc. The arrangement was confirmed in 1731 by an Order in Council, which had the same legal status as an Act of Parliament, and the articles of agreement under which it was conducted by the two parties involved, Lord Tyrone and Robert Lowry, suggest the tone:

The name of each of the new erected parishes shall be wrote on a separate scrole of parchment, roll'd up and put into a hatt, to be held by an indeffernet person,... and that the said Marcus, Lord Viscount of Tyrone, and Robert Lowry shall each put his hand into the said hatt, and take thereout one of the said scroles, and that the advowson of that parish which shall be mentioned in the said scrole .. to be drawn out of the said hatte, by the said Lord Tyrone, shall stand and be the advowson of the said .. Tyrone, his heirs and assigns, for ever."

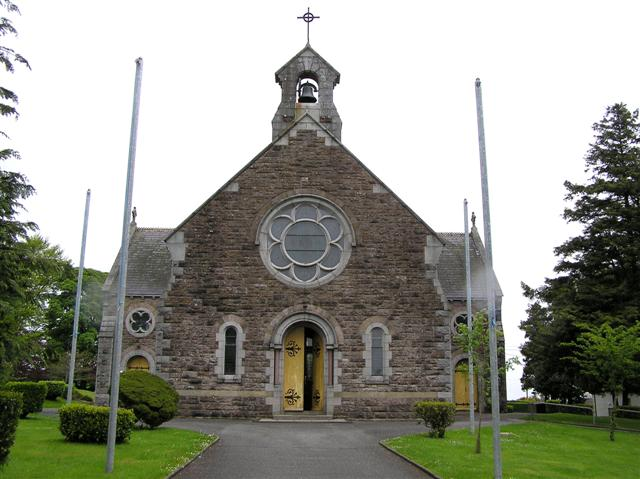
St Mary's Catholic Church, Pomeroy

In 1750 Rev. James Lowry was granted the right to hold a weekly market in Pomeroy and an important event was the twice yearly Hiring Fair, held in May and November. Men and women from the surrounding countryside would gather at the fair and hire themselves out as farm workers and servants. In the 1640s the large forest had been stripped of timber and for many years after remained neglected. In 1770 the Rev. James Lowry undertook its management, replanted about 556 acres (225 ha) and left money to build Pomeroy House. The Lowry family played a big part in the life of the area for about 200 years.

In the square is the Church of Ireland church which dates from the early 1840s. Its belfry and tower were paid for by the Lowry family as a token of their esteem for Pomeroy.

Much of the woodland is gone and the Georgian mansion demolished. All that remains is the family burial vault on Tanderagee Road. This was once approached by the longest avenue of Chilean pine trees in Ireland.

The road leading from Pomeroy to Donaghmore is known as the Royal Road because in 1689 James II and VII took this route to visit his troops in Derry during the historic siege. This route brought him through Cappagh and Altmore. King James's Well is by the roadside just outside Cappagh.

== Transport ==
The Portadown, Dungannon and Omagh Junction Railway opened Pomeroy railway station on 2 September 1861. From 1876 until 1958 it was part of the Great Northern Railway. The Ulster Transport Authority closed the station and the PD&O line on 15 February 1965. Throughout its history it had the highest altitude of any Irish gauge railway station in Ireland. West of Pomeroy the railway reached its summit, 561 feet (171 metres) above sea level, the highest point on Ireland's Irish gauge network.

== Economy ==
Cloughbane Farm at Pomeroy sells locally sourced products directly through its farm shop and through large retailers. In 2006 the company, which has won five UK Great Taste Awards, expanded after securing a supply deal with Tesco.

== Demography ==
=== 2011 Census ===
On Census Day (27 March 2011) the usually resident population of Pomeroy Settlement was 788 accounting for 0.04% of the NI total. In Pomeroy Settlement, considering the resident population:

- 99.49% were from the white (including Irish Traveller) ethnic group
- 89.34% belong to or were brought up in the Catholic religion and 9.26% belong to or were brought up in a 'Protestant and Other Christian (including Christian related)' religion
- 11.17% indicated that they had a British national identity, 55.58% had an Irish national identity and 30.58% had a Northern Irish national identity*.
- 26.68% had some knowledge of Irish
- 2.39% had some knowledge of Ulster-Scots
- 8.92% did not have English as their first language

== Sport ==
Pomeroy Plunketts is the local Gaelic Athletic Association club.

== Places of interest ==
- Altmore
- Carrickmore
- Cavanakeeran
- Gortavoy Bridge
- Mountains of Pomeroy

== Demography ==
On Census Day (27 March 2011) the usually resident population of Pomeroy Settlement was 788, accounting for 0.04% of the NI total. Of these:

- 21.7% were aged under 16 years and 10.66% were aged 65 and over
- 48.1% of the population were male and 51.9% were female
- 89.34% were from a Catholic background and 9.26% were from a 'Protestant and Other Christian (including Christian related)' background

== People ==
- Andrea Begley, winner of BBC's The Voice in June 2013.
- Philomena Begley, Irish country music singer
- Liam Kelly, Irish republican politician and activist
- Kieran McGeary, Gaelic footballer

== See also ==
- List of civil parishes of County Tyrone

== Links ==
- Parish of Pomeroy
