= Galbally, County Tyrone =

Village in County Tyrone, Northern Ireland

Coordinates: 54°32′N 6°53′W

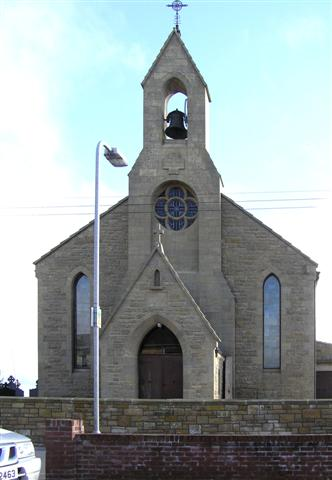
Roman Catholic Church, Galbally.

Galbally (from Irish Gallbhuaile, meaning 'stone booley') is a village close to Donaghmore and Cappagh in County Tyrone, Northern Ireland. Its name was formerly spelt as Gallwolly and Gallwally.

Galbally is a Village located in the Heart of County Tyrone. The village has one pub, a convenience shop, a church, a Chinese takeaway, a post office with an adjoining grocery shop, a primary school and a community Centre. The local Gaelic football team is called Galbally Pearses.

== Notable people ==
One of the 1981 Hunger Strikers, Martin Hurson, was from the townland of Aughnaskea, and is buried at St John's Church, Galbally. Other republicans buried in the area include Declan Arthurs, Tony Gormley in Aughnagar and Eugene Kelly and Martin McCaughey in Altmore.
