= List of townlands of County Tyrone =

This is a sortable table of the approximately 2,162 townlands in County Tyrone, Northern Ireland.

Duplicate names occur where there is more than one townland with the same name in the county. Names marked in bold typeface are towns and villages, and the word Town appears for those entries in the Acres column.

== A ==
Townland	Acres	Barony	Civil parish	Poor law union
Aghaboy Lower	289	Strabane Upper	Bodoney Lower	Gortin
Aghaboy Upper	361	Strabane Upper	Bodoney Lower	Gortin
Aghabrack	268	Strabane Lower	Donaghedy	Gortin
Aghacolumb	294	Dungannon Upper	Arboe	Cookstown
Aghadreenan	101	Omagh East	Donacavey	Omagh
Aghadulla	559	Omagh East	Drumragh	Omagh
Aghadulla (Harper)	862	Omagh East	Dromore	Omagh
Aghafad	1,036	Clogher	Donacavey	Omagh
Aghafad	713	Strabane Lower	Donaghedy	Gortin
Aghafad	336	Strabane Lower	Ardstraw	Strabane
Aghafad	161	Dungannon Middle	Pomeroy	Cookstown
Aghagallon	278	Omagh East	Cappagh	Omagh
Aghaginduff	512	Dungannon Lower	Killeeshil	Dungannon
Aghagogan	949	Omagh East	Termonmaguirk	Omagh
Aghakinmart	269	Omagh West	Longfield West	Castlederg
Aghakinsallagh Glebe	120	Dungannon Middle	Tullyniskan	Dungannon
Aghalane	889	Strabane Upper	Cappagh	Omagh
Aghalane	353	Strabane Upper	Bodoney Upper	Gortin
Aghalarg	172	Dungannon Middle	Donaghenry	Cookstown
Aghalarg Bog (recld.)	6	Dungannon Middle	Donaghenry	Cookstown
Aghaleag	166	Omagh East	Drumragh	Omagh
Aghalougher	110	Omagh West	Termonamongan	Castlederg
Aghalunny	493	Omagh West	Termonamongan	Castlederg
Aghamilkin	194	Clogher	Clogher	Clogher
Aghamore	330	Omagh West	Termonamongan	Castlederg
Aghareany	341	Dungannon Middle	Donaghmore	Dungannon
Agharn	161	Dungannon Middle	Donaghmore	Dungannon
Agharonan	706	Clogher	Donacavey	Omagh
Agharragh	544	Omagh East	Dromore	Omagh
Aghascrebagh	483	Strabane Upper	Bodoney Lower	Gortin
Aghascrebagh	159	Omagh West	Termonamongan	Castlederg
Aghasessy	432	Strabane Lower	Ardstraw	Strabane
Aghaveagh	375	Dungannon Upper	Tamlaght	Cookstown
Aghee	249	Omagh East	Dromore	Omagh
Aghee	138	Omagh East	Drumragh	Omagh
Aghenis	358	Dungannon Lower	Aghaloo	Armagh
Aghindarragh East	278	Clogher	Clogher	Clogher
Aghindarragh West	248	Clogher	Clogher	Clogher
Aghindrumman	159	Clogher	Clogher	Clogher
Aghingowly	214	Clogher	Clogher	Clogher
Aghinlark	253	Clogher	Clogher	Clogher
Aghintober	122	Dungannon Middle	Donaghmore	Dungannon
Aghlisk	248	Omagh East	Dromore	Omagh
Aghnagar	468	Dungannon Middle	Donaghmore	Dungannon
Aghnagar	467	Omagh East	Clogherny	Omagh
Aghnaglea	228	Omagh East	Termonmaguirk	Omagh
Aghnaglosh	263	Clogher	Clogher	Clogher
Aghnagregan	428	Omagh East	Termonmaguirk	Omagh
Aghnahoe	396	Dungannon Lower	Killeeshil	Dungannon
Aghnahoo	271	Omagh West	Termonamongan	Castlederg
Aghnamirigan	378	Strabane Upper	Bodoney Lower	Gortin
Aghnamoe	698	Omagh East	Dromore	Omagh
Aghnamoyle	297	Omagh East	Drumragh	Omagh
Aghnanereagh	286	Omagh East	Termonmaguirk	Omagh
Aghnaskea	240	Dungannon Middle	Pomeroy	Dungannon
Aghyaran	735	Omagh West	Termonamongan	Castlederg
Alderwood	838	Clogher	Aghalurcher	Clogher
Allen	148	Dungannon Upper	Desertcreat	Cookstown
Ally	1,144	Omagh West	Longfield West	Castlederg
Altacamcosy	479	Strabane Upper	Bodoney Lower	Gortin
Altadaven	614	Clogher	Errigal Trough	Clogher
Altaglushan	1,721	Dungannon Middle	Donaghmore	Dungannon
Altamooskan	1,165	Clogher	Errigal Keerogue	Clogher
Altamullan	1,680	Omagh West	Termonamongan	Castlederg
Altanagh	971	Omagh East	Termonmaguirk	Omagh
Altanaveragh	557	Clogher	Clogher	Clogher
Altcloghfin	1,366	Clogher	Errigal Keerogue	Clogher
Altdoghal	559	Strabane Lower	Ardstraw	Gortin
Altdrumman	1,830	Omagh East	Termonmaguirk	Omagh
Altgolan	721	Omagh West	Termonamongan	Castlederg
Altishahane	744	Strabane Lower	Donaghedy	Gortin
Altmore (or Barracktown)	1,117	Dungannon Middle	Pomeroy	Dungannon
Altnageerog	145	Strabane Lower	Leckpatrick	Strabane
Altnagore	249	Clogher	Errigal Keerogue	Clogher
Altnavannog	138	Dungannon Middle	Clonfeacle	Dungannon
Altnaveagh	315	Clogher	Clogher	Clogher
Altrest	255	Strabane Lower	Donaghedy	Strabane
Alwories	406	Strabane Upper	Bodoney Lower	Gortin
Anacramp	241	Dungannon Lower	Aghaloo	Armagh
Anagasna Glebe	146	Dungannon Middle	Clonfeacle	Dungannon
Anagher	276	Dungannon Middle	Clonoe	Dungannon
Aneeter Beg	147	Dungannon Upper	Arboe	Cookstown
Annagarvey	118	Clogher	Clogher	Clogher
Annagh	215	Omagh East	Clogherny	Omagh
Annagh	131	Dungannon Lower	Aghaloo	Clogher
Annagh	127	Dungannon Middle	Clonfeacle	Dungannon
Annagh (Augher)	95	Clogher	Clogher	Clogher
Annagh (Blessingbourne)	124	Clogher	Clogher	Clogher
Annagh Beg	198	Dungannon Lower	Carnteel	Dungannon
Annagh Demesne	121	Clogher	Clogher	Clogher
Annagh More	193	Dungannon Lower	Aghaloo	Dungannon
Annaghalough	164	Omagh West	Longfield West	Castlederg
Annaghananam	162	Dungannon Upper	Desertcreat	Cookstown
Annaghbeg	275	Dungannon Middle	Killyman	Dungannon
Annaghbeg	139	Dungannon Middle	Donaghmore	Dungannon
Annaghbo	47	Clogher	Donacavey	Omagh
Annaghilla	177	Clogher	Errigal Keerogue	Clogher
Annaghmakeown	353	Dungannon Middle	Donaghmore	Dungannon
Annaghmore	472	Dungannon Middle	Clonoe	Dungannon
Annaghmore	365	Dungannon Upper	Arboe	Cookstown
Annaghmore	139	Dungannon Upper	Desertcreat	Cookstown
Annaghmurnin	42	Clogher	Donacavey	Omagh
Annaghnaboe	446	Dungannon Middle	Clonoe	Dungannon
Annaghone	272	Dungannon Middle	Donaghenry	Cookstown
Annaghquin	141	Dungannon Upper	Desertcreat	Cookstown
Annaghroe	147	Dungannon Lower	Aghaloo	Armagh
Annaghsallagh	512	Dungannon Lower	Aghaloo	Dungannon
Annaghteige	115	Dungannon Upper	Desertcreat	Cookstown
Annaginny	150	Dungannon Middle	Donaghmore	Dungannon
Annahavil	359	Dungannon Upper	Desertcreat	Cookstown
Annaloughan	285	Clogher	Clogher	Clogher
Anneeter More	152	Dungannon Upper	Arboe	Cookstown
Archill	788	Strabane Lower	Ardstraw	Castlederg
Ardarver	748	Omagh West	Termonamongan	Castlederg
Ardatinny	243	Clogher	Donacavey	Omagh
Ardbarren Lower	284	Omagh West	Ardstraw	Castlederg
Ardbarren Upper	261	Omagh West	Ardstraw	Castlederg
Ardcame	264	Strabane Lower	Donaghedy	Strabane
Ardcumber	36	Dungannon Upper	Derryloran	Cookstown
Ardean	143	Dungannon Upper	Arboe	Cookstown
Ardmore	238	Strabane Lower	Donaghedy	Strabane
Ards	178	Dungannon Lower	Aghaloo	Armagh
Ardpatrick	102	Dungannon Middle	Donaghenry	Cookstown
Ardstraw	Town	Strabane Lower	Ardstraw	Strabane
Ardstraw	353	Strabane Lower	Ardstraw	Strabane
Ardunshin	163	Clogher	Clogher	Clogher
Ardvarnish	132	Dungannon Upper	Derryloran	Cookstown
Armalughey	253	Dungannon Lower	Carnteel	Clogher
Artclea	334	Clogher	Aghalurcher	Clogher
Artigarvan	175	Strabane Lower	Leckpatrick	Strabane
Arvalee	827	Omagh East	Cappagh	Omagh
Athabryanmore	642	Omagh West	Termonamongan	Castlederg
Athenry	287	Omagh East	Termonmaguirk	Omagh
Attagh	599	Strabane Upper	Bodoney Lower	Gortin
Attaghmore	363	Omagh East	Donacavey	Omagh
Aughagalla	208	Dungannon Middle	Clonoe	Dungannon
Aughagranna	105	Dungannon Middle	Clonoe	Dungannon
Aughamullan	608	Dungannon Middle	Clonoe	Dungannon
Augher	Town	Clogher	Clogher	Clogher
Augher Tenements	222	Clogher	Clogher	Clogher
Aughlish	252	Dungannon Upper	Derryloran	Cookstown
Aughlish	142	Dungannon Middle	Donaghmore	Dungannon
Aughnacarney	175	Clogher	Clogher	Clogher
Aughnacloy	Town	Dungannon Lower	Carnteel	Clogher
Aughrimderg	263	Dungannon Middle	Clonoe	Dungannon
Aughtermoy	235	Strabane Lower	Donaghedy	Strabane

== B ==
Townland	Acres	Barony	Civil parish	Poor law union
Back Lower	433	Dungannon Upper	Ballyclog	Cookstown
Back Upper	279	Dungannon Upper	Ballyclog	Cookstown
Backan	240	Strabane Upper	Bodoney Lower	Gortin
Backfarm	121	Omagh East	Drumragh	Omagh
Backfence	149	Strabane Lower	Leckpatrick	Strabane
Backhill	154	Omagh West	Ardstraw	Castlederg
Backtown	210	Strabane Lower	Urney	Strabane
Balix Lower	537	Strabane Lower	Donaghedy	Gortin
Balix Upper	1,072	Strabane Lower	Donaghedy	Gortin
Ballagh	345	Dungannon Lower	Aghaloo	Armagh
Ballagh	173	Clogher	Clogher	Clogher
Ballaghalare	213	Strabane Lower	Donaghedy	Strabane
Ballaghneed	390	Clogher	Clogher	Clogher
Ballee	540	Strabane Lower	Leckpatrick	Strabane
Ballintrain	729	Omagh East	Termonmaguirk	Omagh
Ballought	250	Strabane Lower	Ardstraw	Strabane
Ballyard	351	Omagh East	Kilskeery	Lowtherstown
Ballybeeny	140	Strabane Lower	Donaghedy	Strabane
Ballybeg	362	Dungannon Middle	Clonoe	Dungannon
Ballyblagh	205	Dungannon Upper	Ballyclog	Cookstown
Ballyboy	190	Dungannon Lower	Aghaloo	Armagh
Ballybray	240	Dungannon Middle	Donaghmore	Dungannon
Ballycolman	588	Strabane Lower	Urney	Strabane
Ballydonaghy	234	Strabane Lower	Leckpatrick	Strabane
Ballyfatten	522	Strabane Lower	Urney	Strabane
Ballyfolliard	392	Strabane Lower	Ardstraw	Castlederg
**Ballygawley**	Town	Clogher	Errigal Keerogue	Clogher
Ballygawley	123	Clogher	Errigal Keerogue	Clogher
Ballygittle	169	Dungannon Middle	Clonoe	Dungannon
Ballygowan	424	Omagh East	Drumragh	Omagh
Ballygreenan	191	Clogher	Clogher	Clogher
Ballygroogan	340	Dungannon Upper	Derryloran	Cookstown
Ballyhallaghan	266	Omagh East	Clogherny	Omagh
Ballyheather	257	Strabane Lower	Donaghedy	Strabane
Ballykeel	442	Strabane Upper	Cappagh	Omagh
Ballykeel	328	Omagh East	Clogherny	Omagh
Ballykeery	940	Strabane Lower	Donaghedy	Strabane
Ballylagan	158	Clogher	Errigal Keerogue	Clogher
Ballylaw	272	Strabane Lower	Leckpatrick	Strabane
Ballylennan Mercer	66	Omagh West	Urney	Castlederg
Ballylennan Scott	204	Omagh West	Urney	Castlederg
Ballymacall	213	Dungannon Middle	Pomeroy	Dungannon
Ballymacan	1,684	Clogher	Clogher	Clogher
Ballymackilduff	264	Dungannon Middle	Clonfeacle	Dungannon
Ballymackilroy	679	Clogher	Errigal Keerogue	Clogher
**Ballymagorry**	Town	Strabane Lower	Leckpatrick	Strabane
Ballymagorry	289	Strabane Lower	Leckpatrick	Strabane
Ballymagowan	285	Clogher	Clogher	Clogher
Ballymaguire	264	Dungannon Upper	Arboe	Cookstown
Ballymenagh	248	Dungannon Middle	Tullyniskan	Dungannon
Ballymenagh	204	Dungannon Upper	Derryloran	Cookstown
Ballymongan	1,172	Omagh West	Termonamongan	Castlederg
Ballymullarty	464	Strabane Lower	Ardstraw	Strabane
Ballymully Glebe	144	Dungannon Upper	Desertcreat	Cookstown
Ballymurphy	255	Dungannon Upper	Arboe	Cookstown
Ballynabwee	208	Strabane Lower	Donaghedy	Strabane
Ballynacross	141	Strabane Lower	Donaghedy	Strabane
Ballynacroy	142	Dungannon Upper	Desertcreat	Cookstown
Ballynafeagh	81	Dungannon Upper	Arboe	Cookstown
Ballynagilly	1,874	Dungannon Upper	Lissan	Cookstown
Ballynagowan Lower (or Bellsgrove)	194	Dungannon Upper	Ballyclog	Cookstown
Ballynagowan Upper (or Bellmount)	202	Dungannon Upper	Ballyclog	Cookstown
Ballynagurragh	195	Clogher	Clogher	Clogher
Ballynahatty	236	Omagh East	Drumragh	Omagh
Ballynahaye	1,451	Dungannon Lower	Killeeshil	Dungannon
Ballynahone	107	Dungannon Upper	Artrea	Cookstown
Ballynakilly	406	Dungannon Middle	Killyman	Dungannon
Ballynakilly	151	Dungannon Upper	Desertcreat	Cookstown
Ballynaloan	140	Strabane Lower	Ardstraw	Castlederg
Ballynamallaght	1,213	Strabane Lower	Donaghedy	Gortin
Ballynamullan	950	Strabane Upper	Cappagh	Omagh
Ballynany	201	Clogher	Errigal Keerogue	Clogher
Ballynapottoge	107	Dungannon Lower	Carnteel	Clogher
Ballynaquilly	456	Strabane Upper	Cappagh	Omagh
Ballynargan	204	Dungannon Upper	Arboe	Cookstown
Ballynasaggar	159	Clogher	Errigal Keerogue	Clogher
Ballynasollus	1,076	Dungannon Upper	Kildress	Cookstown
Ballynasollus	925	Strabane Upper	Bodoney Upper	Gortin
Ballynasollus	261	Dungannon Upper	Derryloran	Cookstown
Ballynatubbrit	447	Strabane Upper	Cappagh	Omagh
Ballyneaner	652	Strabane Lower	Donaghedy	Strabane
Ballyness	798	Clogher	Clogher	Clogher
Ballynorthlan	117	Dungannon Middle	Drumglass	Dungannon
Ballyreagh	237	Dungannon Upper	Derryloran	Cookstown
Ballyrenan	723	Strabane Lower	Ardstraw	Strabane
Ballysaggart	110	Dungannon Middle	Donaghmore	Dungannon
Ballyscally	418	Clogher	Clogher	Clogher
Ballyskeagh	514	Strabane Lower	Leckpatrick	Strabane
Ballysudden	179	Dungannon Upper	Derryloran	Cookstown
Ballyvaddan	319	Clogher	Clogher	Clogher
Ballyvaddy	242	Dungannon Lower	Aghaloo	Dungannon
Ballyveeny	360	Dungannon Upper	Ballyclog	Cookstown
Ballyward	148	Dungannon Middle	Donaghmore	Dungannon
Ballywholan	2,004	Clogher	Clogher	Clogher
Ballywholan	387	Dungannon Upper	Ballyclog	Cookstown
Bancran	769	Omagh East	Termonmaguirk	Omagh
Bank	52	Clogher	Clogher	Clogher
Bardahessiagh	583	Dungannon Upper	Desertcreat	Cookstown
Barnes Lower	446	Strabane Upper	Bodoney Upper	Gortin
Barnes Upper	628	Strabane Upper	Bodoney Upper	Gortin
Baronagh	378	Omagh East	Donacavey	Omagh
Barons Court	885	Strabane Lower	Ardstraw	Strabane
Barracktown (or Altmore)	117	Dungannon Middle	Pomeroy	Dungannon
Barran	299	Strabane Lower	Donaghedy	Strabane
Barravey	260	Omagh West	Longfield West	Castlederg
Beagh	445	Omagh East	Clogherny	Omagh
Beagh	386	Strabane Lower	Ardstraw	Strabane
Beagh	291	Omagh East	Drumragh	Omagh
Beagh	109	Clogher	Aghalurcher	Clogher
Beaghbeg	307	Dungannon Upper	Kildress	Cookstown
Beagh-nore	1,883	Dungannon Upper	Kildress	Cookstown
Bearney Glebe	612	Strabane Lower	Camus	Strabane
Beigh Glebe	243	Clogher	Clogher	Clogher
Beleevna Beg	386	Dungannon Upper	Kildress	Cookstown
Beleevna More	1,637	Dungannon Upper	Kildress	Cookstown
Bellmount (or Ballynagowan Upper)	202	Dungannon Upper	Ballyclog	Cookstown
Bellsgrove (or Ballynagowan Lower)	194	Dungannon Upper	Ballyclog	Cookstown
Bellspark	71	Strabane Lower	Urney	Strabane
Belnaclogh	171	Clogher	Clogher	Clogher
Belnagarnan	148	Clogher	Donacavey	Omagh
Belragh	193	Dungannon Lower	Carnteel	Clogher
Beltany	702	Strabane Upper	Cappagh	Omagh
Beltany	469	Clogher	Clogher	Clogher
Beltonanean	856	Dungannon Upper	Kildress	Cookstown
Beltrim	962	Strabane Upper	Bodoney Lower	Gortin
**Benburb**	Town	Dungannon Middle	Clonfeacle	Dungannon
Benburb	185	Dungannon Middle	Clonfeacle	Dungannon
**Beragh**	Town	Omagh East	Clogherny	Omagh
Beragh	736	Strabane Upper	Cappagh	Omagh
Beragh	481	Omagh East	Clogherny	Omagh
Bernagh	174	Dungannon Middle	Killyman	Dungannon
Berrysfort	98	Omagh West	Urney	Castlederg
Billary	166	Omagh West	Longfield West	Castlederg
Binbunniff	320	Strabane Lower	Donaghedy	Gortin
Binnafreaghan	1,328	Strabane Upper	Bodoney Lower	Gortin
Binnawooda	517	Omagh West	Ardstraw	Castlederg
Binnelly	199	Strabane Lower	Donaghedy	Strabane
Birnaghs	455	Strabane Lower	Ardstraw	Strabane
Blackfort	183	Clogher	Donacavey	Omagh
Blacklands	109	Clogher	Clogher	Clogher
Blacksessagh	151	Omagh East	Drumragh	Omagh
Blacktown	135	Dungannon Middle	Tullyniskan	Dungannon
Bloomhill	71	Clogher	Errigal Keerogue	Clogher
Bloomhill Demesne	92	Dungannon Middle	Tullyniskan	Dungannon
Bloomry	17	Strabane Lower	Ardstraw	Gortin
Bockets	667	Dungannon Lower	Killeeshil	Dungannon
Bodoney	506	Omagh East	Kilskeery	Enniskillen
Bodoney	331	Omagh East	Dromore	Omagh
Bogbane	148	Dungannon Middle	Killyman	Dungannon
Bohard	344	Dungannon Lower	Aghaloo	Dungannon
Boheragh	194	Strabane Upper	Cappagh	Omagh
Bolaght	692	Omagh West	Ardstraw	Castlederg
Boland	190	Dungannon Middle	Clonfeacle	Dungannon
Bolies	418	Clogher	Clogher	Clogher
Bomackatall Lower	1,124	Omagh West	Longfield West	Castlederg
Bomackatall Upper	823	Omagh West	Longfield West	Castlederg
Botera Lower	311	Omagh East	Drumragh	Omagh
Botera Upper	357	Omagh East	Drumragh	Omagh
Bovean	349	Dungannon Middle	Killyman	Dungannon
Boyd's Farm	50	Dungannon Middle	Donaghenry	Cookstown
Brackagh	313	Clogher	Errigal Keerogue	Clogher
Brackagh	91	Omagh East	Kilskeery	Lowtherstown
Brackagh North	1,446	Strabane Upper	Bodoney Lower	Gortin
Brackagh South	326	Strabane Upper	Bodoney Lower	Gortin
Brackaville	235	Dungannon Middle	Donaghenry	Dungannon
Bracky	1,122	Omagh East	Termonmaguirk	Omagh
Bradkeel	511	Strabane Upper	Bodoney Upper	Gortin
Branny	228	Dungannon Lower	Carnteel	Clogher
Branter	51	Clogher	Clogher	Clogher
Breakly	111	Clogher	Aghalurcher	Clogher
Breen	339	Strabane Lower	Ardstraw	Strabane
Bridgetown	317	Omagh West	Urney	Castlederg
Brigh	202	Dungannon Upper	Ballyclog	Cookstown
Brocklis	349	Strabane Lower	Ardstraw	Strabane
Brookend	500	Dungannon Upper	Arboe	Cookstown
Brossloy	133	Dungannon Middle	Clonfeacle	Dungannon
Broughadowey	289	Dungannon Middle	Clonfeacle	Dungannon
Broughderg	4,239	Dungannon Upper	Lissan	Cookstown
Brownhill	125	Strabane Lower	Leckpatrick	Strabane
Bullock Park	398	Omagh West	Longfield West	Castlederg
Bunderg	184	Strabane Lower	Ardstraw	Strabane
Bunnynubber	157	Strabane Upper	Cappagh	Omagh
Bunowen	508	Strabane Lower	Donaghedy	Strabane
Byturn	206	Strabane Lower	Ardstraw	Strabane

== C ==
Townland	Acres	Barony	Civil parish	Poor law union
Cabragh	825	Omagh East	Kilskeery	Lowtherstown
Cabragh	347	Dungannon Lower	Killeeshil	Dungannon
Cadian	642	Dungannon Middle	Clonfeacle	Dungannon
Cady	104	Dungannon Upper	Desertcreat	Cookstown
Cahoo	165	Dungannon Middle	Donaghenry	Cookstown
Caldrum	114	Clogher	Clogher	Clogher
**Caledon**	Town	Dungannon Lower	Aghaloo	Armagh
Caledon	232	Dungannon Lower	Aghaloo	Armagh
Calheme	146	Strabane Lower	Camus	Strabane
Calkill	451	Strabane Upper	Cappagh	Omagh
Camaghy	442	Dungannon Middle	Pomeroy	Dungannon
Camderry	119	Omagh East	Dromore	Omagh
Camowen	478	Omagh East	Cappagh	Omagh
Campsie	260	Omagh East	Cappagh	Omagh
Camus	392	Strabane Lower	Camus	Strabane
Cappagh	464	Dungannon Middle	Pomeroy	Dungannon
Cargagh	134	Clogher	Clogher	Clogher
Carnagat	446	Clogher	Clogher	Clogher
Carnagribban	329	Strabane Lower	Donaghedy	Strabane
Carnahinny	69	Clogher	Clogher	Clogher
Carnalea	530	Omagh East	Dromore	Omagh
Carnalea	229	Clogher	Donacavey	Omagh
Carnan	465	Dungannon Upper	Arboe	Cookstown
Carnanransy	339	Strabane Upper	Bodoney Lower	Gortin
Carnargan	310	Strabane Upper	Bodoney Upper	Gortin
Carnarousk	46	Clogher	Donacavey	Omagh
Carnaveagh	102	Strabane Lower	Ardstraw	Gortin
Carncorran Glebe	243	Omagh West	Ardstraw	Castlederg
Carndreen	477	Omagh West	Termonamongan	Castlederg
Carnenny	305	Dungannon Upper	Desertcreat	Cookstown
Carnkenny	629	Strabane Lower	Ardstraw	Strabane
Carnony	185	Strabane Upper	Cappagh	Omagh
Carnoughter	787	Omagh West	Termonamongan	Castlederg
Carntall Beg	96	Clogher	Clogher	Clogher
Carntall More	161	Clogher	Clogher	Clogher
**Carnteel**	Town	Dungannon Lower	Carnteel	Dungannon
Carnteel	235	Dungannon Lower	Carnteel	Dungannon
Carony	417	Omagh West	Longfield East	Omagh
Carr	214	Clogher	Clogher	Clogher
Carracoghan	357	Omagh West	Termonamongan	Castlederg
Carradoo Glebe	312	Omagh West	Longfield West	Castlederg
Carradowa Glebe	197	Omagh West	Longfield West	Castlederg
Carran	458	Omagh East	Kilskeery	Lowtherstown
Carran	99	Clogher	Errigal Keerogue	Clogher
Carrick	363	Omagh West	Longfield West	Castlederg
Carrickadartan	130	Omagh West	Ardstraw	Castlederg
Carrickaholten	1,030	Omagh West	Termonamongan	Castlederg
Carrickaness	97	Omagh West	Longfield West	Castlederg
Carrickatane	486	Strabane Lower	Donaghedy	Strabane
Carrickavoy	108	Clogher	Errigal Trough	Clogher
Carrickavoy	24	Clogher	Clogher	Clogher
Carrickayne	980	Strabane Lower	Donaghedy	Gortin
Carrickbwee Glebe	278	Omagh West	Longfield West	Castlederg
Carricklee	237	Strabane Lower	Urney	Strabane
Carricklongfield	443	Dungannon Lower	Aghaloo	Dungannon
Carrickmore	915	Omagh East	Termonmaguirk	Omagh
Carrickone	73	Strabane Lower	Urney	Strabane
Carrigans	859	Strabane Upper	Cappagh	Omagh
Carrigullin	497	Strabane Lower	Camus	Strabane
Carrowbeg	280	Dungannon Middle	Clonfeacle	Dungannon
Carrowcolman	267	Dungannon Middle	Clonfeacle	Dungannon
Carrowoaghtragh	833	Strabane Upper	Bodoney Upper	Gortin
Carrycastle	500	Dungannon Middle	Clonfeacle	Dungannon
Carryclogher	252	Clogher	Clogher	Clogher
Carryglass	589	Clogher	Donacavey	Omagh
Cashel	1,261	Strabane Upper	Bodoney Lower	Gortin
Cashty	408	Strabane Lower	Ardstraw	Strabane
Casorna	558	Strabane Upper	Bodoney Lower	Gortin
Castle Farm	205	Dungannon Middle	Donaghenry	Cookstown
Castlebane	158	Omagh West	Ardstraw	Castlederg
**Castlecaulfield**	Town	Dungannon Middle	Donaghmore	Dungannon
Castlecraig	545	Omagh West	Longfield West	Castlederg
Castledamph	929	Strabane Upper	Bodoney Upper	Gortin
**Castlederg**	Town	Omagh West	Urney	Castlederg
Castlegore	446	Omagh West	Urney	Castlederg
Castlehill Demesne	149	Clogher	Clogher	Clogher
Castlemellan	457	Strabane Lower	Donaghedy	Strabane
Castlemervyn Demesne	363	Omagh East	Kilskeery	Lowtherstown
Castleroddy Glebe	432	Strabane Upper	Cappagh	Omagh
Castlesessagh	165	Omagh West	Urney	Castlederg
Castletown	547	Strabane Upper	Cappagh	Omagh
Castletown	349	Strabane Lower	Leckpatrick	Strabane
Castletown	272	Dungannon Lower	Carnteel	Dungannon
Castletown	215	Clogher	Donacavey	Omagh
Castletown	185	Strabane Lower	Urney	Strabane
Castlewarren	797	Strabane Lower	Donaghedy	Strabane
Cattor	192	Clogher	Donacavey	Clogher
Cavan	419	Omagh East	Donacavey	Omagh
Cavan	356	Omagh West	Urney	Castlederg
Cavan	219	Dungannon Middle	Killyman	Dungannon
Cavan	199	Clogher	Clogher	Clogher
Cavan O'Neill	82	Dungannon Lower	Carnteel	Clogher
Cavanacark	410	Clogher	Clogher	Clogher
Cavanacaw	192	Dungannon Middle	Pomeroy	Cookstown
Cavanacaw	116	Omagh East	Drumragh	Omagh
Cavanacaw Lower	228	Omagh East	Drumragh	Omagh
Cavanacaw Upper	293	Omagh East	Drumragh	Omagh
Cavanakeeran	894	Dungannon Middle	Pomeroy	Cookstown
Cavanalee	1,096	Strabane Lower	Camus	Strabane
Cavanamara	484	Omagh East	Kilskeery	Lowtherstown
Cavanboy	120	Dungannon Lower	Aghaloo	Armagh
Cavancreagh	237	Strabane Lower	Donaghedy	Strabane
Cavandarragh	362	Strabane Lower	Ardstraw	Castlederg
Cavankilgreen	414	Dungannon Lower	Carnteel	Clogher
Cavanoneill	258	Dungannon Upper	Kildress	Cookstown
Cavanreagh	670	Omagh East	Termonmaguirk	Omagh
Cavansallagh	82	Omagh West	Longfield West	Castlederg
Cavey	217	Clogher	Errigal Keerogue	Clogher
Church Hill	133	Strabane Lower	Donaghedy	Strabane
**Clady**	Town	Strabane Lower	Urney	Strabane
Clady	173	Strabane Lower	Urney	Strabane
Clady Blair	89	Strabane Lower	Ardstraw	Strabane
Clady Haliday	142	Strabane Lower	Ardstraw	Strabane
Clady Hood	151	Strabane Lower	Ardstraw	Strabane
Clady Johnston	118	Strabane Lower	Ardstraw	Strabane
Clady-sproul (or Liscreevaghan)	121	Strabane Lower	Ardstraw	Strabane
Clagernagh	833	Omagh West	Termonamongan	Castlederg
Claggan	338	Dungannon Middle	Pomeroy	Dungannon
Claggan	179	Dungannon Upper	Derryloran	Cookstown
Claggan	83	Dungannon Upper	Artrea	Cookstown
Claggan North	428	Strabane Lower	Donaghedy	Strabane
Claggan South	330	Strabane Lower	Donaghedy	Gortin
Clanabogan Lower	271	Omagh East	Drumragh	Omagh
Clanabogan Upper	233	Omagh East	Drumragh	Omagh
Clananeese Glebe	162	Dungannon Middle	Donaghmore	Dungannon
Claraghmore	843	Omagh West	Longfield East	Omagh
Clare	377	Omagh East	Termonmaguirk	Omagh
Clare	312	Dungannon Upper	Kildress	Cookstown
Clare	154	Dungannon Upper	Derryloran	Cookstown
Clare Upper	379	Omagh West	Ardstraw	Castlederg
Claremore	277	Clogher	Clogher	Clogher
Claremore	170	Omagh West	Ardstraw	Castlederg
Cleanally	254	Clogher	Errigal Keerogue	Clogher
Clintycracken	125	Dungannon Middle	Clonoe	Dungannon
Clogfin	811	Strabane Upper	Cappagh	Omagh
Cloghboy	204	Strabane Lower	Donaghedy	Strabane
Cloghcor	213	Strabane Lower	Leckpatrick	Strabane
**Clogher**	Town	Clogher	Clogher	Clogher
Clogher Demesne	566	Clogher	Clogher	Clogher
Clogher Tenements	174	Clogher	Clogher	Clogher
Clogherny	819	Strabane Lower	Donaghedy	Gortin
Clogherny	182	Dungannon Middle	Clonfeacle	Dungannon
Clogherny Glebe	973	Strabane Upper	Bodoney Upper	Gortin
Clogherny Glebe Lower	159	Omagh East	Clogherny	Omagh
Clogherny Glebe Upper	766	Omagh East	Clogherny	Omagh
Cloghfiin	97	Dungannon Middle	Donaghenry	Cookstown
Cloghfin	1,815	Omagh East	Termonmaguirk	Omagh
Cloghfin	197	Dungannon Upper	Kildress	Cookstown
Cloghlin	76	Clogher	Clogher	Clogher
Cloghog	205	Dungannon Middle	Clonoe	Dungannon
Cloghog Lower	238	Omagh East	Drumragh	Omagh
Cloghog Upper	162	Omagh East	Drumragh	Omagh
Cloghogle	376	Strabane Lower	Donaghedy	Strabane
Cloghogle (or Glenknock)	560	Strabane Lower	Ardstraw	Gortin
Clonavaddy	590	Dungannon Middle	Donaghmore	Dungannon
Clonbeg	72	Dungannon Middle	Clonfeacle	Dungannon
Cloncandra Glebe	213	Omagh East	Kilskeery	Enniskillen
Cloneblaugh	308	Clogher	Clogher	Clogher
**Clonfeacle**	Town	Dungannon Middle	Clonfeacle	Dungannon
Clonmore	114	Dungannon Middle	Clonfeacle	Dungannon
Clonteevy	155	Dungannon Middle	Clonfeacle	Dungannon
Clontyclevin	214	Dungannon Lower	Killeeshil	Dungannon
Clontyfallow	109	Dungannon Lower	Killeeshil	Dungannon
Clontyferagh	175	Dungannon Upper	Kildress	Cookstown
Cloonty	324	Strabane Lower	Ardstraw	Strabane
Cloonycoppoge	203	Clogher	Clogher	Clogher
Clunahill Glebe	404	Omagh West	Longfield West	Castlederg
Cluntoe (Quin)	197	Dungannon Upper	Arboe	Cookstown
Cluntoe (Richardson)	115	Dungannon Upper	Arboe	Cookstown
Cluntydoon	304	Dungannon Upper	Derryloran	Cookstown
Cluntyganny	264	Dungannon Upper	Lissan	Cookstown
**Coagh**	Town	Dungannon Upper	Tamlaght	Cookstown
Coagh	616	Dungannon Upper	Tamlaght	Cookstown
**Coalisland**	Town	Dungannon Middle	Donaghenry	Cookstown
**Coalisland**	Town	Dungannon Middle	Tullyniskan	Dungannon
Coash	152	Dungannon Middle	Killyman	Dungannon
Cohannan	366	Dungannon Middle	Killyman	Dungannon
Cole	1,103	Clogher	Clogher	Clogher
Collow	221	Omagh West	Longfield West	Castlederg
Common	98	Omagh West	Termonamongan	Castlederg
Common Moss (Reclaimed)	23	Dungannon Middle	Donaghenry	Cookstown
Commons	1	Dungannon Lower	Carnteel	Clogher
Concess	232	Strabane Lower	Ardstraw	Strabane
Congo	214	Dungannon Middle	Drumglass	Dungannon
Conywarren	229	Strabane Upper	Cappagh	Omagh
**Cookstown**	Town	Dungannon Upper	Derryloran	Cookstown
Cookstown	217	Dungannon Upper	Derryloran	Cookstown
Coolageery	142	Clogher	Errigal Keerogue	Clogher
Coolaghy	133	Strabane Lower	Ardstraw	Strabane
Coolatinny	32	Dungannon Middle	Donaghenry	Cookstown
Coolavannagh	1,413	Omagh West	Longfield West	Castlederg
Coolback	124	Omagh East	Kilskeery	Lowtherstown
Coolcreaghy	282	Omagh West	Ardstraw	Castlederg
Coolcush	131	Dungannon Middle	Clonfeacle	Dungannon
Coole	201	Dungannon Middle	Clonoe	Dungarvan
Coolermoney	307	Strabane Lower	Leckpatrick	Strabane
Coolesker	408	Omagh East	Clogherny	Omagh
Cooley	367	Omagh East	Termonmaguirk	Omagh
Coolhill	333	Dungannon Lower	Killeeshil	Dungannon
Coolhill	220	Dungannon Middle	Drumglass	Dungannon
Coolkeeghan	107	Dungannon Upper	Derryloran	Cookstown
Coolkeeragh	548	Omagh West	Longfield East	Omagh
Coolkill	135	Dungannon Middle	Clonfeacle	Dungannon
Coolmaghery	469	Strabane Lower	Donaghedy	Strabane
Coolmaghry	212	Dungannon Middle	Pomeroy	Dungannon
Coolnacrunaght	404	Omagh West	Ardstraw	Castlederg
Coolnafranky	89	Dungannon Upper	Derryloran	Cookstown
Coolnagard Lower	21	Omagh East	Drumragh	Omagh
Coolnagard Upper	130	Omagh East	Drumragh	Omagh
Coolnahavil	42	Dungannon Upper	Derryloran	Cookstown
Coolnaherin Park	81	Omagh West	Ardstraw	Castlederg
Coolreaghs	262	Dungannon Upper	Derryloran	Cookstown
Coolreaghs	42	Dungannon Upper	Lissan	Cookstown
Copney	1,001	Omagh East	Termonmaguirk	Omagh
Corbally	449	Omagh East	Dromore	Omagh
Corbally	267	Clogher	Donacavey	Omagh
Corboe	686	Clogher	Clogher	Clogher
Corchoney	120	Dungannon Upper	Kildress	Cookstown
Corcloghy	1,150	Clogher	Clogher	Clogher
Corcreevy	179	Clogher	Clogher	Clogher
Corcreevy Demesne	134	Clogher	Clogher	Clogher
Corcreevy,(Part of)	8	Clogher	Clogher	Clogher
Corderry	166	Dungannon Lower	Carnteel	Clogher
Cordromedy	206	Omagh East	Kilskeery	Lowtherstown
Corgary Fifth (or First Croagh)	1,236	Omagh West	Termonamongan	Castlederg
Corgary First	131	Omagh West	Termonamongan	Castlederg
Corgary Fourth (or Meenablagh)	766	Omagh West	Termonamongan	Castlederg
Corgary Second	176	Omagh West	Termonamongan	Castlederg
Corgary Sixth (or Second Croagh)	2,411	Omagh West	Termonamongan	Castlederg
Corgary Third	360	Omagh West	Termonamongan	Castlederg
Corick	219	Clogher	Clogher	Clogher
Corickmore	249	Strabane Upper	Bodoney Upper	Gortin
Corkhill	257	Dungannon Middle	Pomeroy	Dungannon
Corkhill	248	Omagh East	Kilskeery	Lowtherstown
Corkhill	224	Dungannon Upper	Kildress	Cookstown
Corkhill	163	Clogher	Clogher	Clogher
Corkhill Demesne	81	Clogher	Clogher	Clogher
Corkragh	91	Omagh East	Kilskeery	Lowtherstown
Corlaghdergan	531	Omagh East	Dromore	Omagh
Corlea	428	Omagh East	Drumragh	Omagh
Corlea	158	Omagh East	Kilskeery	Lowtherstown
Corleaghan	872	Clogher	Clogher	Clogher
Cormore	492	Clogher	Clogher	Clogher
Cormullagh	459	Dungannon Middle	Clonfeacle	Dungannon
Cornabracken	39	Omagh East	Drumragh	Omagh
Cornamaddy	576	Dungannon Middle	Pomeroy	Dungannon
Cornamuck	318	Omagh East	Dromore	Omagh
Cornamucklagh	437	Omagh East	Dromore	Omagh
Cornamucklagh	197	Clogher	Clogher	Clogher
Cornamucklagh	166	Dungannon Middle	Drumglass	Dungannon
Cornashesk	234	Omagh West	Longfield West	Castlederg
Cornavarrow	1,429	Omagh West	Longfield East	Omagh
Corr	374	Dungannon Middle	Killyman	Dungannon
Corradinna	397	Omagh East	Drumragh	Omagh
Corrainy	230	Dungannon Middle	Killyman	Dungannon
Corramore	534	Strabane Upper	Bodoney Upper	Gortin
Corranarry	424	Strabane Upper	Cappagh	Omagh
Corrashesk	152	Clogher	Donacavey	Omagh
Corrasheskin	299	Omagh East	Dromore	Omagh
Corratary	394	Strabane Upper	Bodoney Upper	Gortin
Corrycroar	433	Dungannon Middle	Pomeroy	Cookstown
Corvanaghan	712	Dungannon Upper	Kildress	Cookstown
Cottagequinn	281	Dungannon Middle	Donaghmore	Dungannon
Coyagh	167	Omagh East	Dromore	Omagh
Coyagh Glebe	146	Omagh East	Dromore	Omagh
Craigatuke	481	Strabane Upper	Bodoney Upper	Gortin
Craigmonaghan (Funston)	101	Omagh West	Urney	Castlederg
Craigmonaghan (Nelson)	192	Omagh West	Urney	Castlederg
Craignagapple	781	Strabane Lower	Leckpatrick	Strabane
Craigs	256	Dungannon Upper	Derryloran	Cookstown
Cranfield	96	Dungannon Upper	Derryloran	Cookstown
Cranlome	1,259	Dungannon Lower	Killeeshil	Dungannon
Crannogue	759	Dungannon Middle	Pomeroy	Dungannon
Cranny	510	Omagh East	Donacavey	Omagh
Cranny	416	Strabane Upper	Cappagh	Omagh
Cranny	185	Omagh East	Dromore	Omagh
Cranslough	286	Dungannon Lower	Carnteel	Dungannon
Cratley	145	Dungannon Upper	Ballyclog	Cookstown
Cravenny Irish	146	Dungannon Lower	Carnteel	Clogher
Cravenny Scotch	175	Dungannon Lower	Carnteel	Clogher
Creaghan Glebe	316	Strabane Lower	Donaghedy	Strabane
Creaghcor	232	Strabane Lower	Donaghedy	Strabane
Creeduff	574	Omagh West	Termonamongan	Castlederg
Creenagh	465	Dungannon Middle	Tullyniskan	Dungannon
Creevagh	395	Dungannon Upper	Lissan	Cookstown
Creevagh Lower	123	Dungannon Middle	Donaghmore	Dungannon
Creevagh Upper	109	Dungannon Middle	Drumglass	Dungannon
Creevangar (Alexander)	138	Omagh East	Drumragh	Omagh
Creevangar (White)	47	Omagh East	Drumragh	Omagh
Creevanmore (Crosby)	37	Omagh East	Drumragh	Omagh
Creevanmore (Hunter)	99	Omagh East	Drumragh	Omagh
Creeve	301	Dungannon Upper	Lissan	Cookstown
Creeve	82	Dungannon Middle	Pomeroy	Dungannon
Creeve (part of)	36	Dungannon Middle	Pomeroy	Dungannon
Creevelough	889	Dungannon Lower	Aghaloo	Dungannon
Creevenagh	351	Omagh East	Cappagh	Omagh
Creevy	408	Strabane Lower	Ardstraw	Castlederg
Creevy Lower	113	Omagh West	Urney	Castlederg
Creevy Upper	237	Omagh West	Urney	Castlederg
Creggan	4,022	Omagh East	Termonmaguirk	Omagh
Cregganconroe	907	Omagh East	Termonmaguirk	Omagh
Creggandevesky	1,458	Omagh East	Termonmaguirk	Omagh
Crew	189	Clogher	Errigal Keerogue	Clogher
Crew	107	Dungannon Middle	Clonfeacle	Dungannon
Crew Lower	187	Strabane Lower	Ardstraw	Castlederg
Crew Upper	436	Strabane Lower	Ardstraw	Castlederg
Crigdenis	813	Omagh West	Termonamongan	Castlederg
Crighshane	992	Omagh West	Termonamongan	Castlederg
Crilly	445	Dungannon Lower	Aghaloo	Dungannon
Crilly's Hill	226	Omagh West	Termonamongan	Castlederg
Croagh First (or Corgary Fifth)	1,236	Omagh West	Termonamongan	Castlederg
Croagh Second (or Corgary Sixth)	2,111	Omagh West	Termonamongan	Castlederg
Crockacleaven	659	Clogher	Aghalurcher	Clogher
Crockanboy	753	Strabane Upper	Bodoney Lower	Gortin
Crockatanty	479	Strabane Upper	Bodoney Lower	Gortin
Crocknafarbrague	231	Clogher	Donacavey	Omagh
Crocknahull	87	Clogher	Aghalurcher	Clogher
Cronghill	228	Dungannon Lower	Aghaloo	Dungannon
Crosh	428	Strabane Upper	Cappagh	Omagh
Crosh	426	Strabane Lower	Ardstraw	Gortin
Croshballinree	79	Strabane Lower	Ardstraw	Gortin
Cross Glebe	109	Dungannon Upper	Desertcreat	Cookstown
Crossan	367	Omagh East	Kilskeery	Lowtherstown
Crossboy	95	Clogher	Errigal Keerogue	Clogher
Crosscavanagh	268	Dungannon Middle	Pomeroy	Dungannon
Crossdernot	280	Dungannon Middle	Pomeroy	Dungannon
Crossown	37	Clogher	Clogher	Clogher
Crossteely	177	Dungannon Middle	Clonfeacle	Dungannon
Crouck	952	Strabane Upper	Bodoney Lower	Gortin
Crubinagh	278	Dungannon Middle	Clonfeacle	Dungannon
Cruckaclady	372	Strabane Upper	Bodoney Upper	Gortin
Crucknamona	60	Omagh East	Drumragh	Omagh
Culbuck	179	Omagh East	Drumragh	Omagh
Culkeeran	134	Dungannon Middle	Clonfeacle	Dungannon
Cullamor	517	Clogher	Errigal Trough	Clogher
Cullenbrone	324	Clogher	Errigal Keerogue	Clogher
Cullenfad	250	Dungannon Middle	Donaghmore	Dungannon
Cullenramer	233	Dungannon Middle	Donaghmore	Dungannon
Cullentra	242	Clogher	Aghalurcher	Clogher
Cullentra	188	Dungannon Lower	Killeeshil	Dungannon
Culligan	98	Dungannon Lower	Aghaloo	Armagh
Cullion	1,117	Strabane Upper	Cappagh	Omagh
Cullion	435	Strabane Lower	Donaghedy	Strabane
Cullion	183	Dungannon Middle	Tullyniskan	Dungannon
Cullynane	128	Clogher	Aghalurcher	Clogher
Culmore	160	Omagh East	Drumragh	Omagh
Culnagrew	123	Dungannon Middle	Killyman	Dungannon
Culnaha	171	Clogher	Errigal Keerogue	Clogher
Culrevog	385	Dungannon Middle	Clonfeacle	Dungannon
Culvacullion	1,102	Strabane Upper	Bodoney Lower	Gortin
Cumber	599	Dungannon Lower	Aghaloo	Dungannon
Cumber	189	Clogher	Donacavey	Omagh
Curglassan	214	Dungannon Upper	Ballyclog	Cookstown
Curlagh	365	Dungannon Lower	Aghaloo	Armagh
Curlonan	146	Dungannon Middle	Pomeroy	Dungannon
Curly	221	Omagh East	Dromore	Omagh
Curr	711	Omagh East	Clogherny	Omagh
Curragh Glebe	105	Omagh West	Longfield West	Castlederg
Curraghamulkin	1,150	Omagh West	Longfield West	Castlederg
Curraghinalt	526	Strabane Upper	Bodoney Lower	Gortin
Curraghmacall	1,088	Omagh West	Longfield West	Castlederg
Curran	180	Dungannon Middle	Tullyniskan	Dungannon
Curran	105	Dungannon Middle	Clonfeacle	Dungannon

== D ==
Townland	Acres	Barony	Civil parish	Poor law union
Dartans	367	Omagh West	Urney	Castlederg
Davagh Lower	974	Dungannon Upper	Lissan	Cookstown
Davagh Upper	464	Dungannon Upper	Lissan	Cookstown
Deer Park (Clarke)	165	Omagh East	Drumragh	Omagh
Deer Park Lower (or Deer Park Old)	170	Strabane Lower	Ardstraw	Strabane
Deer Park McCormick	118	Omagh East	Drumragh	Omagh
Deer Park Middle	81	Strabane Lower	Ardstraw	Strabane
Deer Park Upper (or Deer Park New)	229	Strabane Lower	Ardstraw	Strabane
Demesne	594	Dungannon Lower	Aghaloo	Armagh
Dergalt	488	Strabane Lower	Camus	Strabane
Dergany (Maguire)	153	Omagh East	Dromore	Omagh
Dergany (Neville)	161	Omagh East	Dromore	Lowtherstown
Dergbrough	674	Strabane Upper	Bodoney Upper	Gortin
Dergenagh	437	Dungannon Lower	Killeeshil	Dungannon
Dergmoney Lower	234	Omagh East	Drumragh	Omagh
Dergmoney Upper	88	Omagh East	Drumragh	Omagh
Dernabane	372	Dungannon Lower	Carnteel	Clogher
Dernaborey	228	Dungannon Lower	Carnteel	Dungannon
Dernagh	271	Dungannon Middle	Clonoe	Dungannon
Dernagilly	130	Omagh East	Kilskeery	Lowtherstown
Dernalebe	419	Strabane Lower	Camus	Strabane
Dernanaught	325	Dungannon Middle	Pomeroy	Dungannon
Dernaseer	319	Dungannon Middle	Donaghmore	Dungannon
Dernasell	141	Clogher	Errigal Trough	Clogher
Deroran	500	Omagh East	Termonmaguirk	Omagh
Derraghadon	210	Dungannon Middle	Drumglass	Dungannon
Derries	105	Clogher	Clogher	Clogher
Derrinleagh	199	Dungannon Upper	Kildress	Cookstown
Derroar	710	Omagh East	Termonmaguirk	Omagh
Derry	263	Dungannon Middle	Tullyniskan	Dungannon
Derry	187	Omagh East	Kilskeery	Enniskillen
Derryallen	156	Omagh East	Kilskeery	Enniskillen
Derryallen Glebe	25	Omagh East	Kilskeery	Enniskillen
Derryalskea	147	Dungannon Middle	Donaghmore	Dungannon
Derrybard	319	Clogher	Donacavey	Omagh
Derryclay	152	Clogher	Errigal Trough	Clogher
Derrycloony	297	Clogher	Errigal Trough	Clogher
Derrycourtney	101	Dungannon Lower	Aghaloo	Armagh
Derrycreevy	328	Dungannon Lower	Clonfeacle	Dungannon
Derrycreevy	306	Dungannon Middle	Clonfeacle	Dungannon
Derrycreevy (Knox)	118	Dungannon Middle	Clonfeacle	Dungannon
Derrycrin (Conyngham)	515	Dungannon Upper	Ballinderry	Cookstown
Derrycrin (Eglish)	444	Dungannon Upper	Ballinderry	Cookstown
Derrycush	229	Dungannon Lower	Carnteel	Clogher
Derrydrummond	155	Clogher	Clogher	Clogher
Derryfubble	118	Dungannon Middle	Clonfeacle	Dungannon
Derrygally	180	Dungannon Middle	Killyman	Dungannon
Derrygally Demesne	77	Dungannon Middle	Killyman	Dungannon
Derrygonigan	214	Dungannon Upper	Artrea	Cookstown
Derrygooly	108	Dungannon Lower	Aghaloo	Armagh
Derrygoon	498	Strabane Lower	Ardstraw	Castlederg
Derrygoonan	178	Dungannon Middle	Clonfeacle	Dungannon
Derrygortanea	252	Dungannon Upper	Desertcreat	Cookstown
Derrygortrevy	250	Dungannon Middle	Clonfeacle	Dungannon
Derryhash	104	Dungannon Upper	Desertcreat	Cookstown
Derryhoar	171	Dungannon Middle	Donaghmore	Dungannon
Derrykeel and (or Gortlenaghan)	401	Dungannon Middle	Donaghmore	Dungannon
Derrykintone	46	Dungannon Lower	Aghaloo	Armagh
Derrylappen	220	Dungannon Lower	Aghaloo	Dungannon
Derrylattinee	391	Dungannon Middle	Clonfeacle	Dungannon
Derrylea	170	Omagh West	Kilskeery	Enniskillen
Derryloran (or Kirkstown)	174	Dungannon Upper	Derryloran	Cookstown
Derryloughan	1,751	Dungannon Middle	Clonoe	Dungannon
Derrymacanna	147	Omagh East	Kilskeery	Lowtherstown
Derrymeen	205	Dungannon Middle	Killyman	Dungannon
Derrymeen	203	Clogher	Errigal Keerogue	Clogher
Derrynascobe	139	Clogher	Clogher	Clogher
Derrynaseer	280	Omagh East	Dromore	Omagh
Derryoghill	349	Dungannon Middle	Clonfeacle	Dungannon
Derryraghan	170	Dungannon Upper	Desertcreat	Cookstown
Derrytresk	1,020	Dungannon Middle	Clonoe	Dungannon
Derryveen	202	Dungannon Middle	Donaghmore	Dungannon
Derrywinnin Glebe	115	Dungannon Middle	Tullyniskan	Dungannon
Desert	377	Strabane Lower	Leckpatrick	Strabane
Desertcreat	123	Dungannon Upper	Desertcreat	Cookstown
Devaghroy	591	Omagh East	Clogherny	Omagh
Divanagh	94	Clogher	Clogher	Clogher
Donacavey	38	Clogher	Donacavey	Omagh
Donaghanie	1,217	Omagh East	Clogherny	Omagh
Donaghenry	152	Dungannon Middle	Donaghenry	Cookstown
Donaghey	258	Dungannon Middle	Donaghenry	Cookstown
**Donaghmore**	Town	Dungannon Middle	Donaghmore	Dungannon
Donaghmore	91	Dungannon Middle	Donaghmore	Dungannon
Donaghmoyne	174	Clogher	Clogher	Clogher
Donaghrisk	239	Dungannon Upper	Desertcreat	Cookstown
Donnydeade	163	Dungannon Middle	Clonfeacle	Dungannon
Donnygowen	53	Strabane Lower	Urney	Strabane
Doocrock	426	Omagh East	Dromore	Lowtherstown
Doogary	303	Omagh East	Drumragh	Omagh
Doogary	295	Omagh East	Kilskeery	Lowtherstown
Dooish	845	Omagh West	Longfield West	Castlederg
Doolargy	313	Dungannon Lower	Carnteel	Clogher
Doons	262	Dungannon Upper	Kildress	Cookstown
Dooragh	107	Dungannon Middle	Donaghenry	Cookstown
Doorat	929	Strabane Lower	Donaghedy	Gortin
Doorless	106	Dungannon Upper	Derryloran	Cookstown
Doras	9	Dungannon Middle	Tullyniskan	Dungannon
Douglas (or Ligfordrum)	3,883	Strabane Lower	Ardstraw	Strabane
Downs	156	Dungannon Upper	Desertcreat	Cookstown
Drain	459	Strabane Lower	Donaghedy	Strabane
Drain	125	Dungannon Middle	Clonfeacle	Dungannon
Draughton	286	Clogher	Donacavey	Omagh
Dredolt & Dristernan	293	Dungannon Middle	Donaghmore	Dungannon
Dreemore	248	Dungannon Middle	Killyman	Dungannon
Dreenan	459	Omagh West	Termonamongan	Castlederg
Dreigh	243	Omagh East	Kilskeery	Enniskillen
Dressoge	844	Omagh West	Longfield East	Omagh
Dressoge	202	Omagh East	Dromore	Omagh
Dristernan and Dredolt	292	Dungannon Middle	Donaghmore	Dungannon
Droit	768	Strabane Upper	Bodoney Lower	Gortin
**Dromore**	Town	Omagh East	Dromore	Omagh
Dromore	354	Dungannon Upper	Arboe	Cookstown
Dromore	349	Dungannon Lower	Aghaloo	Armagh
Dromore	157	Omagh East	Dromore	Omagh
Dromore Lower	262	Clogher	Clogher	Clogher
Dromore Middle	409	Clogher	Clogher	Clogher
Dromore Upper	226	Clogher	Clogher	Clogher
Drone	104	Dungannon Lower	Carnteel	Clogher
Drudgeon	168	Omagh East	Drumragh	Omagh
Drum	361	Omagh East	Drumragh	Omagh
Drum	237	Dungannon Upper	Kildress	Cookstown
Drumad	421	Dungannon Upper	Tamlaght	Cookstown
Drumadarragh	148	Clogher	Errigal Trough	Clogher
Drumagullion	256	Dungannon Middle	Donaghenry	Cookstown
Drumanuey	132	Dungannon Middle	Clonfeacle	Dungannon
Drumard	337	Dungannon Upper	Derryloran	Cookstown
Drumard	196	Dungannon Upper	Arboe	Cookstown
Drumard	108	Dungannon Middle	Tullyniskan	Dungannon
Drumard Cross	50	Dungannon Middle	Killyman	Dungannon
Drumard Glebe	67	Dungannon Middle	Killyman	Dungannon
Drumardnagross	326	Omagh East	Kilskeery	Lowtherstown
Drumash	141	Omagh East	Kilskeery	Enniskillen
Drumaslaghy	200	Dungannon Lower	Carnteel	Clogher
Drumaspil	177	Dungannon Middle	Killyman	Dungannon
Drumay	212	Dungannon Middle	Clonfeacle	Dungannon
Drumballyhugh	217	Dungannon Upper	Desertcreat	Cookstown
Drumbanaway	193	Dungannon Upper	Ballyclog	Cookstown
Drumbarley	228	Omagh West	Longfield East	Omagh
Drumbearn	169	Dungannon Middle	Donaghmore	Dungannon
Drumbinnion	258	Omagh East	Kilskeery	Lowtherstown
Drumbulgan	54	Dungannon Upper	Ballyclog	Cookstown
Drumcart	203	Dungannon Middle	Clonfeacle	Dungannon
Drumclamph	458	Strabane Lower	Ardstraw	Castlederg
Drumconnelly	357	Omagh East	Drumragh	Omagh
Drumconnis	108	Omagh East	Dromore	Omagh
Drumconor	278	Dungannon Middle	Pomeroy	Dungannon
Drumconway	539	Dungannon Upper	Tamlaght	Cookstown
Drumcoo	509	Dungannon Middle	Drumglass	Dungannon
Drumcorke	87	Clogher	Errigal Keerogue	Clogher
Drumcraw	159	Dungannon Upper	Derryloran	Cookstown
Drumcrow	343	Dungannon Middle	Killyman	Dungannon
Drumcullion	183	Clogher	Errigal Keerogue	Clogher
Drumderg	105	Dungannon Middle	Clonfeacle	Dungannon
Drumderg Glebe	365	Omagh East	Dromore	Omagh
Drumdran	223	Omagh East	Kilskeery	Enniskillen
Drumduff	1,046	Omagh East	Termonmaguirk	Omagh
Drumeagle	145	Strabane Lower	Urney	Strabane
Drumearn	342	Dungannon Lower	Aghaloo	Clogher
Drumearn	247	Dungannon Upper	Derryloran	Cookstown
Drumenagh	162	Dungannon Middle	Killyman	Dungannon
Drumenny (Conyngham)	482	Dungannon Upper	Arboe	Cookstown
Drumenny (Stewart)	170	Dungannon Upper	Arboe	Cookstown
Drumenny Big	307	Strabane Lower	Donaghedy	Strabane
Drumenny Little	132	Strabane Lower	Donaghedy	Strabane
Drumess	128	Dungannon Lower	Aghaloo	Armagh
Drumey	90	Dungannon Middle	Tullyniskan	Dungannon
Drumey	67	Dungannon Middle	Donaghenry	Cookstown
Drumfad	335	Dungannon Lower	Killeeshil	Dungannon
Drumflugh	306	Dungannon Middle	Clonfeacle	Dungannon
Drumgallan	459	Omagh West	Longfield West	Castlederg
Drumgarrell	289	Dungannon Upper	Derryloran	Cookstown
Drumgauty	246	Strabane Lower	Donaghedy	Strabane
Drumgold	153	Dungannon Middle	Clonfeacle	Dungannon
Drumgormal	235	Dungannon Middle	Donaghenry	Cookstown
Drumgormal	153	Dungannon Middle	Clonfeacle	Dungannon
Drumgose	137	Dungannon Middle	Clonfeacle	Dungannon
Drumgrannon	186	Dungannon Middle	Clonfeacle	Dungannon
Drumgrass	148	Dungannon Upper	Lissan	Cookstown
Drumharriff	35	Dungannon Middle	Drumglass	Dungannon
Drumharvey	707	Omagh East	Kilskeery	Lowtherstown
Drumhirk	209	Dungannon Middle	Donaghmore	Dungannon
Drumhirk	159	Clogher	Clogher	Clogher
Drumhirk Glebe	81	Clogher	Clogher	Clogher
Drumhonish	151	Omagh West	Longfield East	Omagh
Drumhorrik	132	Dungannon Middle	Killyman	Dungannon
Drumhubbert	100	Dungannon Upper	Arboe	Cookstown
Drumkee	285	Dungannon Middle	Killyman	Dungannon
Drumkern	295	Dungannon Upper	Ballyclog	Cookstown
Drumlagher	161	Clogher	Donacavey	Omagh
Drumlea	670	Strabane Upper	Bodoney Lower	Gortin
Drumlee	218	Dungannon Middle	Clonfeacle	Dungannon
Drumlegagh	847	Strabane Lower	Ardstraw	Strabane
Drumlester	719	Omagh East	Termonmaguirk	Omagh
Drumlish	375	Omagh East	Dromore	Omagh
Drummahon	510	Omagh West	Termonamongan	Castlederg
Drummallard	212	Omagh East	Dromore	Omagh
Drumman	330	Strabane Lower	Donaghedy	Strabane
Drummenagh	238	Omagh West	Longfield West	Castlederg
Drummerrer	288	Dungannon Middle	Clonoe	Dungannon
Drummillard	176	Dungannon Upper	Desertcreat	Cookstown
Drummond	566	Dungannon Middle	Clonfeacle	Dungannon
Drummond	321	Dungannon Middle	Pomeroy	Dungannon
Drummond	266	Dungannon Lower	Aghaloo	Clogher
Drummond	234	Clogher	Donacavey	Omagh
Drummond	15	Dungannon Upper	Derryloran	Cookstown
Drummuck	83	Dungannon Middle	Killyman	Dungannon
Drumnabey	413	Omagh West	Ardstraw	Castlederg
Drumnaboy	327	Strabane Lower	Camus	Strabane
Drumnacross Lower	190	Dungannon Upper	Kildress	Cookstown
Drumnacross Upper	69	Dungannon Upper	Kildress	Cookstown
Drumnafern	306	Dungannon Middle	Donaghmore	Dungannon
Drumnaforbe	288	Omagh West	Longfield East	Omagh
Drumnaglogh	257	Dungannon Upper	Kildress	Cookstown
Drumnahoe	315	Strabane Lower	Ardstraw	Strabane
Drumnakilly	1,352	Strabane Upper	Termonmaguirk	Omagh
Drumnamalra	266	Omagh West	Longfield West	Castlederg
Drumnamalta	112	Clogher	Errigal Keerogue	Clogher
Drumnamalta	107	Dungannon Upper	Kildress	Cookstown
Drumnamoless	197	Dungannon Middle	Clonfeacle	Dungannon
Drumnashaloge	123	Dungannon Middle	Clonfeacle	Dungannon
Drumnaspar Lower	591	Strabane Upper	Bodoney Upper	Gortin
Drumnaspar Upper	282	Strabane Upper	Bodoney Upper	Gortin
Drumnastrade	192	Dungannon Middle	Clonfeacle	Dungannon
Drumowen	302	Omagh West	Longfield West	Castlederg
**Drumquin**	Town	Omagh West	Longfield West	Castlederg
**Drumquin**	Town	Omagh West	Longfield East	Omagh
Drumquin	398	Omagh West	Longfield West	Castlederg
Drumragh (Caldwell)	370	Omagh East	Drumragh	Omagh
Drumragh (J. McCausland)	45	Omagh East	Drumragh	Omagh
Drumragh (P. McCausland)	207	Omagh East	Drumragh	Omagh
Drumraw	146	Dungannon Upper	Desertcreat	Cookstown
Drumrawn	494	Omagh West	Longfield East	Omagh
Drumreagh Etra	179	Dungannon Middle	Tullyniskan	Dungannon
Drumreagh Otra	186	Dungannon Middle	Tullyniskan	Dungannon
Drumreany	183	Dungannon Middle	Donaghmore	Dungannon
Drumscra	248	Omagh West	Longfield West	Castlederg
Drumshanbo Glebe	871	Dungannon Upper	Kildress	Cookstown
Drumshanly	202	Omagh East	Drumragh	Omagh
Drumsheil	251	Omagh East	Dromore	Omagh
Drumskinny	793	Omagh East	Dromore	Omagh
Drumskinny	64	Dungannon Middle	Clonfeacle	Dungannon
Drumsonnus	391	Omagh East	Kilskeery	Lowtherstown
Drumwhisker	175	Clogher	Donacavey	Omagh
Dullaghan	697	Omagh East	Dromore	Omagh
Dullerton	185	Strabane Lower	Donaghedy	Strabane
Dunamony	351	Dungannon Middle	Clonfeacle	Dungannon
Dunbiggan	295	Clogher	Clogher	Clogher
Dunbreen	484	Strabane Upper	Cappagh	Omagh
Dunbunrawer	942	Strabane Upper	Bodoney Lower	Gortin
Dundivin Glebe	486	Clogher	Donacavey	Omagh
**Dungannon**	Town	Dungannon Middle	Drumglass	Dungannon
Dungate	346	Dungannon Upper	Kildress	Cookstown
Dungoran	305	Clogher	Donacavey	Omagh
Dungorman	162	Dungannon Middle	Killyman	Dungannon
Dungororan	262	Dungannon Middle	Pomeroy	Dungannon
Dunmacmay	305	Dungannon Lower	Aghaloo	Armagh
Dunmisk	235	Omagh East	Termonmaguirk	Omagh
Dunmore	999	Dungannon Upper	Lissan	Cookstown
Dunmoyle	587	Clogher	Errigal Keerogue	Clogher
Dunmullan	261	Strabane Upper	Cappagh	Omagh
Dunnalong	29	Strabane Lower	Donaghedy	Strabane
**Dunnamanagh**	Town	Strabane Lower	Donaghedy	Strabane
Dunnamanagh	130	Strabane Lower	Donaghedy	Strabane
Dunnamona	523	Omagh East	Donacavey	Omagh
Dunnamona Glebe	216	Clogher	Donacavey	Omagh
Dunnamore	876	Dungannon Upper	Kildress	Cookstown
Dunnaree	239	Omagh West	Longfield West	Castlederg
Dunnyboe	519	Strabane Lower	Donaghedy	Strabane
Dunrevan	260	Strabane Lower	Ardstraw	Castlederg
Dunseark	181	Dungannon Middle	Clonfeacle	Dungannon
Dunteige	644	Strabane Lower	Ardstraw	Omagh
Dunwish	256	Omagh East	Drumragh	Omagh
Durless Black	197	Clogher	Errigal Trough	Clogher
Durless White	143	Clogher	Errigal Trough	Clogher
Dutless	169	Dungannon Upper	Artrea	Cookstown
Dyan	149	Dungannon Lower	Aghaloo	Armagh

== E ==
Townland	Acres	Barony	Civil parish	Poor law union
Eary Lower	120	Dungannon Upper	Arboe	Cookstown
Eary Upper	133	Dungannon Upper	Ballyclog	Cookstown
Ecclesville Demesne	229	Clogher	Donacavey	Omagh
Eden	250	Strabane Lower	Donaghedy	Strabane
Eden Back	563	Strabane Upper	Bodoney Upper	Gortin
Eden Fore	414	Strabane Upper	Bodoney Upper	Gortin
Eden Mill	30	Strabane Upper	Bodoney Upper	Gortin
Edenacrannon	270	Dungannon Middle	Donaghmore	Dungannon
Edenafogry	213	Omagh East	Donacavey	Omagh
Edenageeragh	334	Dungannon Lower	Aghaloo	Dungannon
Edenagon	223	Omagh East	Dromore	Lowtherstown
Edenasop	274	Omagh West	Termonamongan	Castlederg
Edenasop East	23	Clogher	Donacavey	Omagh
Edenasop West	25	Clogher	Donacavey	Omagh
Edenatoodry	288	Clogher	Donacavey	Omagh
Edenderry	326	Omagh East	Cappagh	Omagh
Edendoit	350	Dungannon Upper	Desertcreat	Cookstown
Edendork	111	Dungannon Middle	Tullyniskan	Dungannon
Edenmore	30	Clogher	Errigal Trough	Clogher
Edenreagh	630	Omagh West	Termonamongan	Castlederg
Edentiloan	243	Dungannon Lower	Carnteel	Dungannon
Edergole	1,094	Clogher	Clogher	Clogher
Edergoole Lower	268	Omagh East	Drumragh	Omagh
Edergoole Upper	329	Omagh East	Drumragh	Omagh
Edernagh	168	Dungannon Upper	Artrea	Cookstown
Ednashanlaght	93	Omagh West	Longfield West	Castlederg
Edymore	951	Strabane Lower	Camus	Strabane
Effernan Glebe	521	Omagh East	Kilskeery	Enniskillen
Eglish (or The Gort)	74	Dungannon Upper	Ballinderry	Cookstown
Elagh	578	Strabane Lower	Camus	Strabane
Elagh	329	Dungannon Upper	Arboe	Cookstown
Enagh	194	Dungannon Lower	Aghaloo	Armagh
Ennish	174	Dungannon Lower	Killeeshil	Dungannon
Enniskillen	243	Dungannon Upper	Artrea	Cookstown
Envagh	1,147	Strabane Lower	Ardstraw	Strabane
Erganagh	498	Strabane Lower	Ardstraw	Castlederg
Erganagh Glebe	573	Strabane Upper	Cappagh	Omagh
Errigal	570	Clogher	Errigal Keerogue	Clogher
Esker	515	Omagh East	Dromore	Omagh
Eskeradooey	563	Strabane Upper	Cappagh	Omagh
Eskerboy	231	Omagh East	Termonmaguirk	Omagh
Eskermore	347	Clogher	Clogher	Clogher
Eskermore	318	Omagh East	Clogherny	Omagh
Eskernabrougue	269	Clogher	Clogher	Clogher
Eskragh	532	Clogher	Clogher	Clogher
Eskragh	292	Dungannon Middle	Donaghmore	Dungannon
Eskragh	270	Dungannon Lower	Killeeshil	Dungannon
Essan	630	Omagh West	Termonamongan	Castlederg
Evish	870	Strabane Lower	Camus	Strabane
Evishacrancussy	629	Dungannon Upper	Kildress	Cookstown
Evishanoran	743	Dungannon Upper	Kildress	Cookstown
Evishbrack	426	Dungannon Upper	Kildress	Cookstown

== F ==
Townland	Acres	Barony	Civil parish	Poor law union
Faccary	1,766	Strabane Upper	Cappagh	Omagh
Fallagh Lower	487	Strabane Upper	Bodoney Lower	Gortin
Fallagh Middle	439	Strabane Upper	Bodoney Lower	Gortin
Fallagh Upper	192	Strabane Upper	Bodoney Lower	Gortin
Fallaghearn	1,628	Clogher	Errigal Keerogue	Clogher
Fallaghearn	168	Omagh East	Donacavey	Omagh
Fardross Demesne	173	Clogher	Clogher	Clogher
Fardross Mountain	985	Clogher	Clogher	Clogher
Farlough	369	Dungannon Middle	Tullyniskan	Dungannon
Farranetra	129	Clogher	Clogher	Clogher
Farrest	181	Strabane Upper	Cappagh	Omagh
Farriter	271	Dungannon Lower	Killeeshil	Dungannon
Farsnagh	199	Dungannon Upper	Arboe	Cookstown
Fasglashagh	501	Dungannon Lower	Killeeshil	Dungannon
Favor Royal Demesne	670	Clogher	Errigal Trough	Clogher
Fawney	357	Strabane Lower	Donaghedy	Strabane
Feagh	58	Dungannon Upper	Arboe	Cookstown
Feddan	119	Clogher	Errigal Keerogue	Clogher
Feegarran	289	Dungannon Upper	Derryloran	Cookstown
Feenan	154	Clogher	Donacavey	Omagh
Feglish	366	Omagh East	Kilskeery	Lowtherstown
Fernagh	216	Strabane Upper	Cappagh	Omagh
Fernaghandrum	537	Clogher	Clogher	Clogher
Fernamenagh	103	Clogher	Errigal Keerogue	Clogher
Ferney	404	Omagh East	Kilskeery	Lowtherstown
Feroy	162	Dungannon Middle	Donaghmore	Dungannon
Fifth Corgary (or First Croagh)	1,236	Omagh West	Termonamongan	Castlederg
Findermore	195	Clogher	Clogher	Clogher
Findrum	221	Clogher	Errigal Keerogue	Clogher
Finglush	123	Dungannon Lower	Aghaloo	Armagh
Finnelly	159	Dungannon Middle	Clonfeacle	Dungannon
Fintona	17	Clogher	Donacavey	Omagh
**Fintonagh**	Town	Clogher	Donacavey	Omagh
Finulagh	162	Dungannon Middle	Donaghmore	Dungannon
Finvey	94	Dungannon Upper	Desertcreat	Cookstown
Fireagh (Cochrane)	91	Omagh East	Drumragh	Omagh
Fireagh (Gardiner)	82	Omagh East	Drumragh	Omagh
Fireagh (Thompson)	137	Omagh East	Drumragh	Omagh
First Croagh (or Fifth Corgary)	1,236	Omagh West	Termonamongan	Castlederg
**Fivemiletown**	Town	Clogher	Clogher	Clogher
Fivemiletown	231	Clogher	Clogher	Clogher
Flushtown	116	Strabane Lower	Urney	Strabane
Fogart	281	Clogher	Clogher	Clogher
Foremass Lower	360	Clogher	Errigal Keerogue	Clogher
Foremass Upper	729	Clogher	Errigal Keerogue	Clogher
Formil	2,691	Strabane Upper	Bodoney Lower	Gortin
Fort-town	57	Strabane Lower	Urney	Strabane
Fourth Corgary (or Meenablagh)	766	Omagh West	Termonamongan	Castlederg
Foygh	150	Dungannon Middle	Donaghmore	Dungannon
Freughlough	592	Omagh West	Urney	Castlederg
Freughmore	466	Omagh East	Drumragh	Omagh
Freughmore	339	Clogher	Donacavey	Omagh
Freughmore	244	Clogher	Clogher	Clogher
Fyfin	282	Strabane Lower	Ardstraw	Castlederg
Fyfin	222	Strabane Lower	Leckpatrick	Strabane
Fymore Mourtray	118	Clogher	Errigal Trough	Clogher
Fymore Todd	113	Clogher	Errigal Trough	Clogher

== G ==
Townland	Acres	Barony	Civil parish	Poor law union
Galbally	390	Omagh East	Dromore	Lowtherstown
Galbally	258	Dungannon Middle	Pomeroy	Dungannon
Galbally	140	Omagh East	Cappagh	Omagh
Galcussagh	234	Dungannon Upper	Desertcreat	Cookstown
Gallagh	144	Clogher	Errigal Trough	Clogher
Gallan Lower	343	Strabane Lower	Ardstraw	Gortin
Gallan Upper	954	Strabane Lower	Ardstraw	Gortin
Gallanagh	65	Dungannon Upper	Derryloran	Cookstown
Gallany	296	Strabane Lower	Urney	Strabane
Gammy	138	Omagh East	Drumragh	Omagh
Ganvaghan Hemphill	446	Omagh West	Urney	Castlederg
Ganvaghan Kyle	54	Omagh West	Urney	Castlederg
Ganvaghan Semple	272	Omagh West	Urney	Castlederg
Gardrum	247	Omagh East	Dromore	Omagh
Gargadis	252	Omagh East	Kilskeery	Lowtherstown
Gargrim	217	Clogher	Donacavey	Omagh
Garlaw	177	Clogher	Clogher	Clogher
Garrison Glebe	262	Omagh West	Longfield West	Castlederg
Gartagher	51	Omagh West	Longfield East	Omagh
Garvagh	1,213	Strabane Upper	Bodoney Lower	Gortin
Garvagh	957	Omagh West	Termonamongan	Castlederg
Garvagh	859	Strabane Upper	Bodoney Upper	Gortin
Garvagh	303	Omagh East	Drumragh	Omagh
Garvagh	265	Dungannon Middle	Donaghmore	Dungannon
Garvagh Blane	357	Omagh West	Termonamongan	Castlederg
Garvagh Pullans	214	Omagh West	Termonamongan	Castlederg
Garvaghullion	640	Omagh West	Longfield East	Omagh
Garvaghy	1,533	Clogher	Errigal Keerogue	Clogher
Garvaghy	312	Omagh East	Cappagh	Omagh
Garvaghy	199	Omagh East	Kilskeery	Lowtherstown
Garvaghy	140	Dungannon Middle	Clonfeacle	Dungannon
Garvallagh	507	Clogher	Donacavey	Omagh
Garvetagh Lower	308	Omagh West	Ardstraw	Castlederg
Garvetagh Upper	367	Omagh West	Ardstraw	Castlederg
Garvey	310	Dungannon Lower	Carnteel	Clogher
Gillygooly	434	Omagh East	Drumragh	Omagh
Glack	411	Dungannon Lower	Carnteel	Clogher
Glasdrummond	357	Dungannon Lower	Aghaloo	Dungannon
Glashygolgan	516	Strabane Upper	Bodoney Upper	Gortin
Glasmullagh	713	Strabane Lower	Ardstraw	Omagh
Glasmullagh	255	Dungannon Middle	Donaghmore	Dungannon
Glasmullagh	69	Dungannon Upper	Kildress	Cookstown
Glasmullagh North	195	Omagh East	Kilskeery	Lowtherstown
Glasmullagh South	111	Omagh East	Kilskeery	Enniskillen
Glebe	281	Strabane Lower	Urney	Strabane
Glebe	196	Strabane Lower	Leckpatrick	Strabane
Glebe	92	Dungannon Upper	Ballyclog	Cookstown
Glebe	74	Dungannon Upper	Derryloran	Cookstown
Glebe	49	Dungannon Middle	Donaghenry	Cookstown
Glebe	45	Dungannon Upper	Artrea	Cookstown
Glebe	41	Omagh West	Longfield East	Omagh
Glebe	33	Omagh West	Termonamongan	Castlederg
Glebe (Old)	189	Strabane Lower	Urney	Strabane
Glebe Farm	11	Dungannon Middle	Clonoe	Dungannon
Glen Upper	320	Omagh East	Termonmaguirk	Omagh
Glenadush	239	Dungannon Middle	Donaghmore	Dungannon
Glenarb	191	Dungannon Lower	Aghaloo	Armagh
Glenarny	179	Dungannon Upper	Kildress	Cookstown
Glenbeg	322	Dungannon Middle	Pomeroy	Dungannon
Glenburrisk	186	Dungannon Middle	Pomeroy	Dungannon
Glenchiel	1,514	Strabane Upper	Bodoney Upper	Gortin
Glenchuil	662	Clogher	Errigal Keerogue	Clogher
Glencon	323	Dungannon Middle	Tullyniskan	Dungannon
Glencoppogagh	1,079	Strabane Upper	Bodoney Upper	Gortin
Glencordial	1,340	Strabane Upper	Cappagh	Omagh
Glencosh	354	Strabane Lower	Donaghedy	Strabane
Glencrew	150	Dungannon Lower	Aghaloo	Clogher
Glencull	241	Dungannon Lower	Killeeshil	Clogher
Glendavagh	588	Dungannon Lower	Aghaloo	Dungannon
Gleneeny	586	Omagh East	Termonmaguirk	Omagh
Glenerin	2,014	Strabane Upper	Bodoney Upper	Gortin
Glenga	579	Strabane Upper	Bodoney Upper	Gortin
Glengarrow	996	Strabane Lower	Donaghedy	Gortin
Glengawna	850	Strabane Upper	Cappagh	Omagh
Glengeen	1,044	Omagh East	Dromore	Omagh
Glenglush	373	Strabane Lower	Ardstraw	Castlederg
Glenhoy	152	Clogher	Clogher	Clogher
Glenkeen	468	Dungannon Lower	Aghaloo	Dungannon
Glenknock (or Cloghogle)	560	Strabane Lower	Ardstraw	Gortin
Glenlark	3,140	Strabane Upper	Bodoney Lower	Gortin
Glenmacoffer	2,703	Strabane Upper	Bodoney Lower	Gortin
Glennageeragh	359	Clogher	Clogher	Clogher
Glennagoorland Glebe	691	Strabane Lower	Donaghedy	Strabane
Glennan	217	Omagh East	Donacavey	Omagh
Glennoo	1,713	Clogher	Clogher	Clogher
Glenroan	2,153	Strabane Upper	Bodoney Upper	Gortin
Glenroe	93	Dungannon Lower	Carnteel	Clogher
Glentimon	317	Strabane Lower	Urney	Strabane
Glentown	230	Strabane Lower	Urney	Strabane
Gloudstown	131	Strabane Lower	Donaghedy	Strabane
Gobnascale	208	Strabane Lower	Donaghedy	Strabane
Golan	682	Dungannon Lower	Carnteel	Clogher
Golan	280	Omagh East	Dromore	Omagh
Golan	245	Strabane Upper	Cappagh	Omagh
Golan Adams	87	Omagh West	Ardstraw	Castlederg
Golan Glebe	463	Omagh East	Kilskeery	Enniskillen
Golan Hunter	77	Omagh West	Ardstraw	Castlederg
Golan Sproul	180	Omagh West	Ardstraw	Castlederg
Golandun Dolan	447	Omagh West	Termonamongan	Castlederg
Golandun McHugh	538	Omagh West	Termonamongan	Castlederg
Goles	4,255	Strabane Upper	Bodoney Upper	Gortin
Gorestown	315	Dungannon Middle	Clonfeacle	Dungannon
Gorey	280	Dungannon Middle	Donaghmore	Dungannon
Gort	463	Dungannon Middle	Clonfeacle	Dungannon
Gort	297	Clogher	Errigal Keerogue	Clogher
Gortacar (Doris)	227	Dungannon Upper	Desertcreat	Cookstown
Gortacar (Glassy)	62	Dungannon Upper	Desertcreat	Cookstown
Gortaclady	302	Dungannon Upper	Kildress	Cookstown
Gortaclare	365	Strabane Lower	Donaghedy	Strabane
Gortaclare	151	Omagh East	Clogherny	Omagh
Gortacloghan	60	Dungannon Middle	Donaghenry	Cookstown
Gortagammon	120	Dungannon Middle	Donaghenry	Cookstown
Gortagowan	99	Dungannon Upper	Desertcreat	Cookstown
Gortalowry	281	Dungannon Upper	Derryloran	Cookstown
Gortatray	169	Dungannon Middle	Donaghenry	Cookstown
Gortatray Bog	8	Dungannon Middle	Donaghenry	Cookstown
Gortavale	354	Dungannon Upper	Desertcreat	Cookstown
Gortavea	256	Strabane Lower	Donaghedy	Strabane
Gortavilly	152	Dungannon Upper	Desertcreat	Cookstown
Gortavoy	105	Dungannon Middle	Pomeroy	Dungannon
Gortfad	139	Dungannon Upper	Desertcreat	Cookstown
Gortfad Glebe	185	Dungannon Upper	Desertcreat	Cookstown
Gortfin	197	Omagh East	Termonmaguirk	Omagh
Gortfinbar	1,028	Omagh East	Termonmaguirk	Omagh
Gortgonis	363	Dungannon Middle	Tullyniskan	Dungannon
Gortgranagh	222	Strabane Upper	Cappagh	Omagh
Gorticashel Lower	1,009	Strabane Upper	Bodoney Lower	Gortin
Gorticashel Upper	723	Strabane Upper	Bodoney Lower	Gortin
Gorticrum Irish	126	Strabane Lower	Leckpatrick	Strabane
Gorticrum Scotch	191	Strabane Lower	Leckpatrick	Strabane
Gortigal	217	Dungannon Upper	Arboe	Cookstown
Gortileck	427	Strabane Lower	Donaghedy	Strabane
**Gortin**	Town	Strabane Upper	Bodoney Lower	Gortin
Gortin	706	Strabane Upper	Bodoney Lower	Gortin
Gortin	202	Dungannon Middle	Tullyniskan	Dungannon
Gortin	62	Dungannon Upper	Derryloran	Cookstown
Gortinagin	586	Strabane Upper	Cappagh	Omagh
Gortindarragh	297	Dungannon Middle	Pomeroy	Dungannon
Gortindarragh	233	Dungannon Upper	Desertcreat	Cookstown
Gortlenaghan & Derrykeel	401	Dungannon Middle	Donaghmore	Dungannon
Gortlogher	309	Strabane Lower	Urney	Strabane
Gortmellan	574	Strabane Lower	Donaghedy	Strabane
Gortmerron	303	Dungannon Middle	Clonfeacle	Dungannon
Gortmerron	140	Dungannon Middle	Drumglass	Dungannon
Gortmessan	175	Strabane Lower	Donaghedy	Strabane
Gortmonly	255	Strabane Lower	Donaghedy	Strabane
Gortmore	219	Omagh East	Drumragh	Omagh
Gortmore	216	Clogher	Clogher	Clogher
Gortnacreagh	451	Strabane Upper	Cappagh	Omagh
Gortnagarn	844	Dungannon Middle	Pomeroy	Cookstown
Gortnaglogh	182	Dungannon Middle	Clonoe	Dungannon
Gortnaglush	129	Dungannon Middle	Donaghmore	Dungannon
Gortnagola	187	Dungannon Middle	Pomeroy	Dungannon
Gortnagross	442	Omagh West	Termonamongan	Castlederg
Gortnagross	150	Dungannon Upper	Kildress	Cookstown
Gortnagwyg	128	Dungannon Upper	Arboe	Cookstown
Gortnaskea	159	Dungannon Upper	Ballyclog	Cookstown
Gortnaskea	46	Dungannon Middle	Tullyniskan	Dungannon
Gortnasoal Glebe	298	Omagh West	Longfield West	Castlederg
Gortrea	125	Dungannon Middle	Killyman	Dungannon
Gortreagh	776	Dungannon Upper	Kildress	Cookstown
Gortreagh	133	Dungannon Upper	Derryloran	Cookstown
Gortrush	106	Omagh East	Drumragh	Omagh
Gortshalgan	217	Dungannon Middle	Killyman	Dungannon
Gowshill	85	Dungannon Middle	Donaghenry	Cookstown
Granagh	771	Omagh East	Termonmaguirk	Omagh
**Grange**	Town	Dungannon Upper	Desertcreat	Cookstown
Grange	802	Strabane Lower	Ardstraw	Strabane
Grange	518	Dungannon Middle	Clonfeacle	Dungannon
Grange	338	Clogher	Errigal Keerogue	Clogher
Grange	298	Dungannon Upper	Desertcreat	Cookstown
Grange	102	Clogher	Clogher	Clogher
Grange Foyle	593	Strabane Lower	Donaghedy	Strabane
Grange Mountain Bar	1,926	Clogher	Clogher	Clogher
Green Hill Demesne	254	Clogher	Errigal Keerogue	Clogher
Greenan	1,306	Omagh East	Dromore	Omagh
Greenan	337	Omagh East	Kilskeery	Enniskillen
Greenan	310	Strabane Upper	Bodoney Lower	Gortin
Greenbrae	110	Strabane Lower	Leckpatrick	Strabane
Greenlaw	158	Strabane Lower	Leckpatrick	Strabane
**Grenville**	Town	Dungannon Middle	Clonfeacle	Dungannon
**Grenville**	Town	Dungannon Middle	Donaghmore	Dungannon
Guiness	145	Dungannon Lower	Aghaloo	Armagh
Gulladoo	197	Omagh East	Donacavey	Omagh
Gunnell	88	Clogher	Clogher	Clogher

== H ==
Townland	Acres	Barony	Civil parish	Poor law union
Hackincon	173	Omagh East	Kilskeery	Lowtherstown
Halftown	76	Clogher	Errigal Keerogue	Clogher
High Cross	181	Dungannon Middle	Donaghenry	Cookstown
Hill Head	48	Omagh West	Longfield West	Castlederg
Hollyhill	629	Strabane Lower	Leckpatrick	Strabane
Hunterstown	37	Strabane Lower	Urney	Strabane

== I ==
Townland	Acres	Barony	Civil parish	Poor law union
Inchenay	174	Strabane Lower	Urney	Strabane
Inchenny Upper	169	Strabane Lower	Urney	Strabane
Inisclan	449	Strabane Upper	Cappagh	Omagh
Inisclan	363	Strabane Lower	Urney	Strabane
Inishative	1,466	Omagh East	Termonmaguirk	Omagh
Inishmagh	289	Dungannon Lower	Carnteel	Dungannon
Innevall	191	Dungannon Middle	Donaghenry	Cookstown

== K ==
Townland	Acres	Barony	Civil parish	Poor law union
Keady	212	Clogher	Errigal Keerogue	Clogher
Keadycam	588	Strabane Upper	Bodoney Upper	Gortin
Kedew	250	Dungannon Lower	Aghaloo	Armagh
Keenaghan	1,377	Strabane Lower	Leckpatrick	Strabane
Keenaghan	731	Dungannon Upper	Kildress	Cookstown
Keenaghan	180	Dungannon Middle	Killyman	Dungannon
Keenogue	268	Omagh East	Kilskeery	Lowtherstown
Keerin	430	Strabane Upper	Bodoney Lower	Gortin
Kennystown	102	Strabane Lower	Urney	Strabane
Kerrib	435	Dungannon Middle	Pomeroy	Dungannon
Kilcam	203	Omagh East	Clogherny	Omagh
Kilclay	215	Clogher	Clogher	Clogher
Kilclean	907	Omagh West	Urney	Castlederg
Kilcoony	80	Dungannon Upper	Ballyclog	Cookstown
Kilcootry	274	Clogher	Donacavey	Omagh
Kilcroagh	351	Omagh West	Urney	Castlederg
Kilcronagh	184	Dungannon Upper	Derryloran	Cookstown
Kildress Lower	198	Dungannon Upper	Kildress	Cookstown
Kildress Upper	82	Dungannon Upper	Kildress	Cookstown
Kildrum	405	Omagh East	Dromore	Omagh
Kilgort	295	Clogher	Donacavey	Omagh
Kilgowney	113	Dungannon Lower	Aghaloo	Armagh
Kilgreen Lower	88	Clogher	Errigal Keerogue	Clogher
Kilgreen Upper	73	Clogher	Errigal Keerogue	Clogher
Kilknock	296	Omagh East	Kilskeery	Enniskillen
Kill	652	Clogher	Aghalurcher	Clogher
Killadroy	665	Omagh East	Clogherny	Omagh
Killaney Lower	101	Clogher	Clogher	Clogher
Killaney Upper	49	Clogher	Clogher	Clogher
Killary Glebe	119	Dungannon Middle	Clonoe	Dungannon
Killaveney	218	Clogher	Errigal Trough	Clogher
Killeen	466	Strabane Lower	Ardstraw	Strabane
Killeen	164	Dungannon Middle	Clonoe	Dungannon
Killeenan	1,513	Dungannon Upper	Kildress	Cookstown
Killeeshil	521	Dungannon Lower	Killeeshil	Dungannon
Killen	356	Omagh West	Longfield West	Castlederg
Killen Far	327	Omagh West	Termonamongan	Castlederg
Killen Near	279	Omagh West	Termonamongan	Castlederg
Killenny	225	Strabane Lower	Donaghedy	Strabane
Killeter	427	Omagh West	Termonamongan	Castlederg
Killey	352	Dungannon Middle	Pomeroy	Cookstown
Killins	926	Strabane Upper	Cappagh	Omagh
Killinure	437	Strabane Upper	Cappagh	Omagh
Killoan	941	Omagh West	Longfield West	Castlederg
Killoon	131	Dungannon Upper	Ballyclog	Cookstown
Killucan	1,503	Dungannon Upper	Kildress	Cookstown
Killyberry	205	Clogher	Donacavey	Omagh
Killyblunick Glebe	418	Omagh East	Kilskeery	Enniskillen
Killybrack	541	Strabane Upper	Cappagh	Omagh
Killybracken	334	Dungannon Middle	Clonfeacle	Dungannon
Killybrackey	193	Dungannon Middle	Drumglass	Dungannon
Killycanavan Lower	84	Dungannon Upper	Arboe	Cookstown
Killycanavan Upper	145	Dungannon Upper	Arboe	Cookstown
Killyclogher	300	Strabane Upper	Cappagh	Omagh
Killyclooney	768	Strabane Lower	Donaghedy	Strabane
Killycolp	113	Dungannon Upper	Desertcreat	Cookstown
Killycolpy	746	Dungannon Upper	Arboe	Cookstown
Killycorran	105	Clogher	Clogher	Clogher
Killycurragh	773	Dungannon Upper	Derryloran	Cookstown
Killycurragh	449	Strabane Upper	Cappagh	Omagh
Killycurry	150	Strabane Lower	Donaghedy	Strabane
Killydart	469	Strabane Lower	Ardstraw	Strabane
Killyfaddy	154	Clogher	Clogher	Clogher
Killyfuddy	195	Omagh East	Kilskeery	Lowtherstown
Killygarvan	139	Dungannon Upper	Desertcreat	Cookstown
Killygavanagh	68	Dungannon Middle	Donaghmore	Dungannon
Killygonlan	513	Dungannon Upper	Arboe	Cookstown
Killygordon	581	Clogher	Clogher	Clogher
Killyharry Glebe	255	Dungannon Middle	Donaghmore	Dungannon
Killylack Glebe	55	Dungannon Middle	Drumglass	Dungannon
Killylevin	255	Dungannon Middle	Donaghmore	Dungannon
Killyliss	408	Dungannon Middle	Donaghmore	Dungannon
Killyliss	231	Clogher	Donacavey	Omagh
Killymaddy (Evans)	186	Dungannon Middle	Donaghmore	Dungannon
Killymaddy (Knox)	333	Dungannon Middle	Donaghmore	Dungannon
Killymam	156	Dungannon Upper	Derryloran	Cookstown
Killymeal	72	Dungannon Middle	Drumglass	Dungannon
Killymenagh	256	Dungannon Upper	Arboe	Cookstown
Killymendon	247	Omagh East	Kilskeery	Lowtherstown
Killymoon Demesne	589	Dungannon Upper	Derryloran	Cookstown
Killymoonan	207	Omagh East	Donacavey	Omagh
Killymore	448	Strabane Lower	Ardstraw	Gortin
Killymorgan	185	Clogher	Errigal Keerogue	Clogher
Killymoyle	273	Dungannon Middle	Donaghmore	Dungannon
Killymurphy	152	Dungannon Middle	Donaghenry	Cookstown
Killynaght	489	Strabane Lower	Leckpatrick	Strabane
Killynaul	334	Dungannon Lower	Aghaloo	Dungannon
Killyneedan	166	Dungannon Upper	Desertcreat	Cookstown
Killyneery	198	Dungannon Lower	Carnteel	Clogher
Killyneill	201	Dungannon Middle	Drumglass	Dungannon
Killyquinn	70	Dungannon Middle	Donaghmore	Dungannon
Killywoolaghan	759	Dungannon Upper	Arboe	Cookstown
Kilmakardle	236	Dungannon Middle	Pomeroy	Dungannon
Kilmascally	254	Dungannon Upper	Arboe	Cookstown
Kilmore	398	Dungannon Lower	Aghaloo	Dungannon
Kilmore	266	Omagh East	Drumragh	Omagh
Kilmore	222	Dungannon Middle	Pomeroy	Dungannon
Kilmore (Irvine)	373	Omagh West	Longfield West	Castlederg
Kilmore (Robinson)	628	Omagh West	Longfield West	Castlederg
Kilnacart	182	Dungannon Middle	Clonfeacle	Dungannon
Kilnagrew	107	Dungannon Middle	Clonfeacle	Dungannon
Kilnaheery	657	Clogher	Clogher	Clogher
Kilnahusogue	595	Clogher	Clogher	Clogher
Kilnaslee	301	Dungannon Middle	Donaghmore	Dungannon
Kilreal Lower	116	Omagh West	Ardstraw	Castlederg
Kilreal Upper	242	Omagh West	Ardstraw	Castlederg
Kilruddan	142	Clogher	Clogher	Clogher
Kilsalley	373	Dungannon Upper	Ballyclog	Cookstown
Kilsampson	65	Dungannon Lower	Aghaloo	Armagh
Kilsannagh	412	Dungannon Lower	Aghaloo	Dungannon
Kilskeery Glebe	165	Omagh East	Kilskeery	Enniskillen
Kilstrule	924	Strabane Lower	Ardstraw	Strabane
Kiltamnagh	237	Omagh East	Drumragh	Omagh
Kiltermon	118	Clogher	Aghalurcher	Clogher
Kiltyclay	276	Dungannon Upper	Desertcreat	Cookstown
Kiltyclogher	163	Dungannon Upper	Desertcreat	Cookstown
Kinego	125	Dungannon Middle	Killyman	Dungannon
Kingarrow	246	Strabane Upper	Cappagh	Omagh
Kingarve	169	Dungannon Middle	Drumglass	Dungannon
Kinine	316	Omagh East	Kilskeery	Lowtherstown
Kinkit	319	Strabane Lower	Urney	Strabane
Kinnagillian	502	Dungannon Upper	Kildress	Cookstown
Kinrush	609	Dungannon Upper	Arboe	Cookstown
Kinturk	188	Dungannon Upper	Arboe	Cookstown
Kirkstown (or Derryloran)	174	Dungannon Upper	Derryloran	Cookstown
Kirlish	497	Omagh West	Longfield West	Castlederg
Kivlin	88	Omagh East	Drumragh	Omagh
Knockacunny	160	Dungannon Upper	Derryloran	Cookstown
Knockadreen	105	Dungannon Lower	Carnteel	Clogher
Knockaginny	437	Dungannon Lower	Aghaloo	Armagh
Knockaleery	432	Dungannon Upper	Kildress	Cookstown
Knockanbrack	20	Strabane Lower	Leckpatrick	Strabane
Knockanroe	147	Dungannon Upper	Artrea	Cookstown
Knockaraven	394	Omagh East	Dromore	Omagh
Knockarogan Glebe	154	Dungannon Middle	Clonfeacle	Dungannon
Knockavaddy	236	Dungannon Upper	Desertcreat	Cookstown
Knockbrack	102	Omagh West	Ardstraw	Castlederg
Knockbrack	87	Clogher	Errigal Keerogue	Clogher
Knockinarvoer	185	Strabane Lower	Leckpatrick	Strabane
Knockiniller	448	Strabane Lower	Ardstraw	Strabane
Knockmany	350	Clogher	Clogher	Clogher
Knockmoyle	86	Strabane Upper	Cappagh	Omagh
Knocknacarney	169	Clogher	Clogher	Clogher
Knocknaclogha	275	Dungannon Middle	Pomeroy	Dungannon
Knocknacloy	220	Dungannon Middle	Clonfeacle	Dungannon
Knocknagor	152	Omagh East	Kilskeery	Lowtherstown
Knocknahorn	533	Omagh East	Dromore	Omagh
Knocknahorna	245	Strabane Lower	Leckpatrick	Strabane
Knocknarney	217	Dungannon Lower	Carnteel	Dungannon
Knocknaroy	526	Dungannon Lower	Aghaloo	Dungannon
Knockonny	368	Clogher	Errigal Keerogue	Clogher
Knockroe	595	Strabane Lower	Ardstraw	Strabane

== L ==
Townland	Acres	Barony	Civil parish	Poor law union
Lackagh	769	Omagh West	Longfield West	Castlederg
Lackagh	295	Clogher	Donacavey	Omagh
Lagavadder	361	Strabane Lower	Leckpatrick	Strabane
Lagavittal	213	Strabane Lower	Leckpatrick	Strabane
Laghey	113	Dungannon Middle	Killyman	Dungannon
Laght	462	Omagh West	Longfield East	Omagh
Laghtfoggy	637	Omagh West	Termonamongan	Castlederg
Laghtmorris	640	Omagh West	Termonamongan	Castlederg
Lagnagalloglagh	156	Strabane Lower	Leckpatrick	Strabane
Lairakean	113	Dungannon Lower	Aghaloo	Armagh
Lammy	244	Dungannon Upper	Desertcreat	Cookstown
Lammy	153	Omagh East	Drumragh	Omagh
Lanaglug	348	Dungannon Upper	Ballinderry	Cookstown
Landahussy Lower	306	Strabane Upper	Bodoney Upper	Gortin
Landahussy Upper	281	Strabane Upper	Bodoney Upper	Gortin
Laragh	485	Omagh East	Clogherny	Omagh
Laragh	72	Strabane Lower	Ardstraw	Strabane
Largybeg	527	Strabane Lower	Ardstraw	Strabane
Latbeg	235	Clogher	Clogher	Clogher
Leaghan	917	Strabane Upper	Bodoney Lower	Gortin
Leaghs	660	Strabane Upper	Bodoney Upper	Gortin
Leany	182	Dungannon Lower	Carnteel	Dungannon
Learden Lower	428	Strabane Upper	Bodoney Upper	Gortin
Learden Upper	538	Strabane Upper	Bodoney Upper	Gortin
Learmore	406	Omagh West	Urney	Castlederg
Leat	181	Strabane Lower	Donaghedy	Strabane
Leck	72	Dungannon Upper	Ballyclog	Cookstown
Leckin	330	Strabane Upper	Bodoney Lower	Gortin
Leckpatrick	551	Strabane Lower	Leckpatrick	Strabane
Lederg	40	Dungannon Middle	Killyman	Dungannon
Legacurry	500	Omagh East	Clogherny	Omagh
Legacurry	334	Strabane Upper	Cappagh	Omagh
Legacurry	137	Dungannon Upper	Desertcreat	Cookstown
Legamaghery	290	Clogher	Donacavey	Omagh
Legane	371	Dungannon Lower	Aghaloo	Dungannon
Leganvy	440	Omagh West	Longfield East	Omagh
Legaroe	443	Dungannon Lower	Carnteel	Dungannon
Legatiggle	302	Clogher	Donacavey	Omagh
Legatonegan	493	Omagh West	Termonamongan	Castlederg
Legcloghfin	994	Strabane Upper	Bodoney Upper	Gortin
Legilly	263	Dungannon Middle	Clonfeacle	Dungannon
Legland	659	Strabane Lower	Ardstraw	Strabane
Legmurn	225	Dungannon Upper	Ballyclog	Cookstown
Legnabraid	548	Strabane Lower	Ardstraw	Gortin
Legnacash	89	Dungannon Upper	Kildress	Cookstown
Legnagappoge	1,223	Strabane Lower	Donaghedy	Gortin
Legphressy	615	Omagh West	Longfield East	Omagh
Leitrim	266	Strabane Lower	Donaghedy	Strabane
Leitrim	252	Omagh West	Termonamongan	Castlederg
Lenadremnagh	110	Dungannon Middle	Clonoe	Dungannon
Lenagh	1,182	Strabane Upper	Bodoney Lower	Gortin
Lenamore	1,276	Strabane Upper	Bodoney Lower	Gortin
Letfern	425	Omagh East	Clogherny	Omagh
Letterbin	707	Strabane Lower	Ardstraw	Strabane
Letterbrat	708	Strabane Upper	Bodoney Upper	Gortin
Lettercarn	512	Omagh West	Ardstraw	Castlederg
Letterclery	141	Dungannon Middle	Donaghenry	Cookstown
Lettergash	613	Omagh East	Dromore	Lowtherstown
Lettery	579	Omagh East	Dromore	Omagh
Lettery	182	Clogher	Errigal Keerogue	Clogher
Lifford	515	Omagh East	Kilskeery	Enniskillen
Ligatraght	697	Strabane Upper	Bodoney Lower	Gortin
Ligfordrum (or Douglas)	3,883	Strabane Lower	Ardstraw	Strabane
Liggartown	261	Strabane Lower	Urney	Strabane
Liggins	433	Strabane Upper	Bodoney Lower	Gortin
Limehill	1,436	Dungannon Upper	Desertcreat	Cookstown
Linnyglass	102	Dungannon Upper	Ballyclog	Cookstown
Lisaclare	185	Dungannon Middle	Clonoe	Dungannon
Lisacoppin	140	Omagh East	Cappagh	Omagh
Lisadavil	100	Dungannon Lower	Carnteel	Clogher
Lisanelly	288	Strabane Upper	Cappagh	Omagh
Lisavaddy	38	Clogher	Donacavey	Omagh
Lisbancarney	79	Dungannon Middle	Clonfeacle	Dungannon
Lisbane	120	Clogher	Clogher	Clogher
Lisbanlemneigh	88	Dungannon Middle	Clonfeacle	Dungannon
Lisbeg	233	Dungannon Lower	Carnteel	Clogher
Lisboy	272	Omagh East	Cappagh	Omagh
Lisboy	247	Clogher	Clogher	Clogher
Lisboy	152	Dungannon Upper	Artrea	Cookstown
Lisboy	70	Dungannon Middle	Donaghmore	Dungannon
Liscabble	517	Strabane Upper	Bodoney Lower	Gortin
Liscausy	107	Dungannon Upper	Artrea	Cookstown
Liscloon Lower	269	Strabane Lower	Donaghedy	Strabane
Liscloon Upper	346	Strabane Lower	Donaghedy	Strabane
Lisconduff	205	Dungannon Lower	Carnteel	Dungannon
Lisconrea	146	Clogher	Donacavey	Omagh
Liscreevaghan (or Clady-sproul)	121	Strabane Lower	Ardstraw	Strabane
Liscurry	79	Strabane Lower	Leckpatrick	Strabane
Lisdergan	23	Clogher	Donacavey	Omagh
Lisdermot	95	Dungannon Middle	Clonfeacle	Dungannon
Lisdivin Lower	149	Strabane Lower	Donaghedy	Strabane
Lisdivin Upper	102	Strabane Lower	Donaghedy	Strabane
Lisdoart	190	Dungannon Lower	Carnteel	Clogher
Lisdoo	340	Strabane Lower	Urney	Strabane
Lisdoo	166	Strabane Lower	Leckpatrick	Strabane
Lisdoo	153	Omagh East	Kilskeery	Lowtherstown
Lisduff	76	Dungannon Middle	Clonfeacle	Dungannon
Lisfearty	175	Dungannon Lower	Killeeshil	Dungannon
Lisgallon	258	Dungannon Middle	Donaghmore	Dungannon
Lisginny	113	Dungannon Lower	Carnteel	Clogher
Lisgobban	135	Dungannon Middle	Clonfeacle	Dungannon
Lisgonnell	121	Clogher	Errigal Keerogue	Clogher
Lisgorran	219	Clogher	Clogher	Clogher
Liskinbwee	140	Strabane Lower	Camus	Strabane
Liskincon	96	Omagh East	Termonmaguirk	Omagh
Liskittle	89	Dungannon Middle	Donaghenry	Cookstown
Lisky	375	Strabane Lower	Camus	Strabane
Lisky	88	Clogher	Donacavey	Omagh
Lisky Glebe	108	Omagh West	Longfield West	Castlederg
Lislaferty	216	Strabane Lower	Ardstraw	Strabane
Lislaird	451	Omagh West	Termonamongan	Castlederg
Lislane	898	Clogher	Clogher	Clogher
Lislap East	866	Strabane Upper	Cappagh	Omagh
Lislap West	212	Strabane Upper	Cappagh	Omagh
Lislea	171	Clogher	Clogher	Clogher
Lislea	76	Omagh East	Cappagh	Omagh
Lislea North and South	426	Strabane Upper	Bodoney Upper	Gortin
Lislee	124	Dungannon Middle	Donaghenry	Cookstown
Lisleen	213	Omagh West	Ardstraw	Castlederg
Lislimnaghan	108	Strabane Upper	Cappagh	Omagh
Lismore	311	Clogher	Errigal Keerogue	Clogher
Lismore	135	Clogher	Clogher	Clogher
Lismulladown	385	Dungannon Lower	Aghaloo	Dungannon
Lismulrevy	175	Dungannon Middle	Clonfeacle	Dungannon
Lisnabulrevey	59	Clogher	Donacavey	Omagh
Lisnabunny	56	Clogher	Errigal Keerogue	Clogher
Lisnaclin	88	Dungannon Middle	Drumglass	Dungannon
Lisnacloon	445	Omagh West	Termonamongan	Castlederg
Lisnacreaght	866	Strabane Lower	Ardstraw	Omagh
Lisnacreaght	764	Strabane Upper	Bodoney Upper	Gortin
Lisnacreeve	507	Clogher	Donacavey	Omagh
Lisnacroy	102	Dungannon Middle	Clonfeacle	Dungannon
Lisnafin	766	Strabane Lower	Ardstraw	Gortin
Lisnagardy	107	Clogher	Donacavey	Omagh
Lisnagirr	515	Strabane Upper	Cappagh	Omagh
Lisnagleer	237	Dungannon Middle	Pomeroy	Dungannon
Lisnagowan	132	Dungannon Middle	Donaghmore	Dungannon
Lisnahall	98	Dungannon Upper	Artrea	Cookstown
Lisnahanna	297	Omagh East	Kilskeery	Lowtherstown
Lisnaharney	409	Strabane Upper	Cappagh	Omagh
Lisnahoy	48	Dungannon Middle	Killyman	Dungannon
Lisnahull	118	Dungannon Middle	Donaghmore	Dungannon
Lisnamaghery	184	Clogher	Clogher	Clogher
Lisnamallard	175	Strabane Upper	Cappagh	Omagh
Lisnamonaghan	132	Dungannon Middle	Donaghmore	Dungannon
Lisnanane	319	Dungannon Upper	Desertcreat	Cookstown
Lisnarable	341	Clogher	Clogher	Clogher
Lisnaragh Irish	616	Strabane Lower	Donaghedy	Gortin
Lisnaragh Scotch	172	Strabane Lower	Donaghedy	Gortin
Lisnastrane	248	Dungannon Middle	Clonoe	Dungannon
Lisnatunny Glebe	485	Strabane Lower	Ardstraw	Gortin
Lisnawery	96	Clogher	Errigal Keerogue	Clogher
Lisneight	49	Dungannon Middle	Donaghenry	Cookstown
Lisroan	133	Dungannon Middle	Clonfeacle	Dungannon
Lissan	220	Dungannon Upper	Lissan	Cookstown
Lissan	217	Omagh East	Drumragh	Omagh
Lissan	147	Dungannon Middle	Clonfeacle	Dungannon
Lissaneden	315	Omagh East	Dromore	Omagh
Listamlet	166	Dungannon Middle	Clonfeacle	Dungannon
Listymore	809	Strabane Lower	Ardstraw	Castlederg
Longhill	141	Omagh East	Dromore	Omagh
Longridge	75	Clogher	Clogher	Clogher
Losset	184	Clogher	Clogher	Clogher
Loughans	397	Dungannon Lower	Carnteel	Clogher
Loughash	1,173	Strabane Lower	Donaghedy	Gortin
Loughermore Glebe	68	Clogher	Aghalurcher	Clogher
Loughmacrory	1,651	Omagh East	Termonmaguirk	Omagh
Loughmuck (Alcorn)	336	Omagh East	Drumragh	Omagh
Loughmuck (Wallace)	165	Omagh East	Drumragh	Omagh
Loughneas	264	Strabane Lower	Leckpatrick	Strabane
Loughry	87	Dungannon Upper	Desertcreat	Cookstown
Loughry	46	Dungannon Upper	Derryloran	Cookstown
Loughry Demesne	128	Dungannon Upper	Derryloran	Cookstown
Loughterush	302	Omagh East	Kilskeery	Lowtherstown
Low Cross	175	Dungannon Upper	Desertcreat	Cookstown
Lowertown	185	Dungannon Middle	Killyman	Dungannon
Loy	135	Dungannon Upper	Derryloran	Cookstown
Lungs	218	Clogher	Clogher	Clogher
Lurgaboy	139	Dungannon Middle	Drumglass	Dungannon
Lurgacullion	289	Dungannon Lower	Killeeshil	Dungannon
Lurganaglare	319	Clogher	Clogher	Clogher
Lurganboy	663	Clogher	Errigal Keerogue	Clogher
Lurganboy	304	Strabane Lower	Ardstraw	Castlederg
Lurganboy	150	Strabane Upper	Cappagh	Omagh
Lurganboy	141	Clogher	Donacavey	Omagh
Lurganboy	89	Dungannon Upper	Artrea	Cookstown
Lurganeden	298	Dungannon Middle	Pomeroy	Cookstown
Lurgy	292	Dungannon Middle	Donaghenry	Cookstown
Lurgylea	412	Dungannon Middle	Pomeroy	Dungannon
Lurgyroe	197	Dungannon Middle	Arboe	Cookstown

== M ==
Townland	Acres	Barony	Civil parish	Poor law union
Mac Crackens	40	Strabane Lower	Leckpatrick	Strabane
Mackenny	175	Dungannon Upper	Kildress	Cookstown
Magharenny	933	Omagh West	Longfield East	Omagh
Magheracoltan	762	Strabane Lower	Ardstraw	Strabane
Magheracreggan	355	Strabane Lower	Ardstraw	Castlederg
Magheragar	353	Strabane Lower	Urney	Strabane
Magheragart	122	Omagh East	Dromore	Omagh
Magheragart (Donnell)	281	Omagh East	Dromore	Omagh
Magheragart (or Sessiaghs)	190	Omagh East	Dromore	Omagh
Magheraglass	286	Dungannon Upper	Kildress	Cookstown
Magherakeel	443	Omagh West	Termonamongan	Castlederg
Magheralamfield	277	Dungannon Middle	Clonoe	Dungannon
Magheralough	248	Strabane Lower	Ardstraw	Castlederg
Magheralough	196	Omagh East	Kilskeery	Lowtherstown
Magheramason	230	Strabane Lower	Donaghedy	Strabane
Magheramulkenny	197	Dungannon Middle	Clonoe	Dungannon
Magheranageeragh	399	Omagh West	Termonamongan	Castlederg
Magherareagh	361	Strabane Lower	Donaghedy	Strabane
Magirr	211	Strabane Lower	Urney	Strabane
Maine	475	Strabane Upper	Cappagh	Omagh
Makenny	810	Omagh East	Kilskeery	Lowtherstown
Mallabeny	328	Clogher	Clogher	Clogher
Maloon	164	Dungannon Upper	Derryloran	Cookstown
Marrock Glebe	149	Omagh West	Longfield West	Castlederg
Martray	250	Dungannon Lower	Carnteel	Clogher
Meaghy	908	Strabane Lower	Ardstraw	Strabane
Meeltogues	144	Omagh East	Kilskeery	Lowtherstown
Meenablagh (or Fourth Corgary)	766	Omagh West	Termonamongan	Castlederg
Meenacloy	416	Omagh West	Longfield West	Castlederg
Meenacrane	716	Strabane Upper	Bodoney Upper	Gortin
Meenadoan	731	Omagh West	Longfield West	Castlederg
Meenadoo	1,047	Strabane Upper	Bodoney Lower	Gortin
Meenafergus	697	Omagh West	Termonamongan	Castlederg
Meenagar	434	Omagh East	Dromore	Omagh
Meenagarragh	207	Strabane Upper	Bodoney Upper	Gortin
Meenagh	292	Dungannon Middle	Clonoe	Dungannon
Meenagh Hill	251	Strabane Lower	Donaghedy	Strabane
Meenagorp	296	Strabane Upper	Bodoney Upper	Gortin
Meenagowan	209	Omagh East	Dromore	Omagh
Meenagrogan	333	Omagh West	Termonamongan	Castlederg
Meenaheery Glebe	137	Omagh West	Longfield West	Castlederg
Meenakeeran	2,305	Omagh West	Termonamongan	Castlederg
Meenamullan	629	Omagh West	Termonamongan	Castlederg
Meenanea	344	Dungannon Upper	Kildress	Cookstown
Meenarodda	2,157	Strabane Upper	Bodoney Lower	Gortin
Meenascallagh	302	Dungannon Upper	Kildress	Cookstown
Meenbog	881	Omagh West	Longfield West	Castlederg
Meencargagh	502	Omagh West	Longfield West	Castlederg
Meencarriga	334	Omagh West	Termonamongan	Castlederg
Meenclogher	401	Omagh West	Termonamongan	Castlederg
Meendamph	1,640	Strabane Lower	Donaghedy	Gortin
Meenmossogue Glebe	347	Omagh West	Longfield West	Castlederg
Meetinghouse-hill	83	Omagh East	Drumragh	Omagh
Merchantstown Glebe	344	Omagh East	Termonmaguirk	Omagh
Millberry	255	Dungannon Lower	Aghaloo	Armagh
Millix	1,230	Clogher	Errigal Keerogue	Dungannon
Milltown	610	Strabane Lower	Ardstraw	Strabane
Milltown	181	Strabane Lower	Leckpatrick	Strabane
Milltown	147	Strabane Lower	Donaghedy	Strabane
Milltown	15	Strabane Lower	Camus	Strabane
Mineveigh	152	Dungannon Middle	Tullyniskan	Dungannon
Moboy	961	Dungannon Upper	Kildress	Cookstown
Moghan	178	Dungannon Middle	Donaghmore	Dungannon
Monanameal	543	Strabane Upper	Bodoney Lower	Gortin
Moneycanon	406	Strabane Lower	Donaghedy	Strabane
Moneygar	504	Omagh East	Kilskeery	Lowtherstown
Moneygaragh	166	Dungannon Upper	Desertcreat	Cookstown
Monrush	160	Dungannon Upper	Derryloran	Cookstown
Moorfield	499	Omagh East	Kilskeery	Lowtherstown
Moree	263	Dungannon Upper	Desertcreat	Cookstown
Mossmore	190	Dungannon Middle	Clonfeacle	Dungannon
Mount Bernard	50	Omagh West	Urney	Castlederg
Mount Stewart	634	Clogher	Clogher	Clogher
Mountcastle	188	Strabane Lower	Donaghedy	Strabane
Mountjoy Forest East Div.	1,751	Strabane Upper	Cappagh	Omagh
Mountjoy Forest West Div.	1,018	Strabane Upper	Cappagh	Omagh
Mournbeg	48	Omagh West	Termonamongan	Castlederg
Mousetown	143	Dungannon Middle	Clonoe	Dungannon
Moveagh	323	Dungannon Upper	Derryloran	Cookstown
**Moy**	Town	Dungannon Middle	Clonfeacle	Dungannon
Moy	237	Dungannon Middle	Clonfeacle	Dungannon
Moyagh	155	Strabane Lower	Donaghedy	Strabane
Moyard	228	Dungannon Middle	Clonfeacle	Dungannon
Moygashel	315	Dungannon Middle	Clonfeacle	Dungannon
Moylagh	536	Omagh East	Clogherny	Omagh
Moyle Glebe	410	Strabane Lower	Ardstraw	Gortin
Moymore	592	Dungannon Upper	Desertcreat	Cookstown
Moynagh	111	Dungannon Upper	Desertcreat	Cookstown
Moyroe	136	Dungannon Middle	Killyman	Dungannon
Mulboy	173	Dungannon Middle	Clonfeacle	Dungannon
Mullagh	119	Strabane Lower	Ardstraw	Strabane
Mullaghadrolly	90	Dungannon Middle	Donaghmore	Dungannon
Mullaghadun	139	Dungannon Middle	Drumglass	Dungannon
Mullaghanagh	160	Dungannon Middle	Donaghmore	Dungannon
Mullagharn	251	Omagh East	Drumragh	Omagh
Mullagharn (Young)	81	Omagh East	Drumragh	Omagh
Mullaghbane	690	Omagh East	Dromore	Omagh
Mullaghbane	280	Dungannon Middle	Donaghmore	Dungannon
Mullaghbane	245	Dungannon Lower	Carnteel	Clogher
Mullaghboy	174	Dungannon Middle	Clonfeacle	Dungannon
Mullaghconor Glebe	190	Dungannon Middle	Donaghmore	Dungannon
Mullaghcreevy	231	Dungannon Middle	Donaghmore	Dungannon
Mullaghdaly	200	Dungannon Middle	Clonfeacle	Dungannon
Mullaghfurtherland	161	Dungannon Middle	Donaghmore	Dungannon
Mullaghglass	245	Dungannon Upper	Arboe	Cookstown
Mullaghlongfield	111	Dungannon Middle	Clonfeacle	Dungannon
Mullaghmarget	70	Dungannon Middle	Tullyniskan	Dungannon
Mullaghmenagh Lower	127	Omagh East	Drumragh	Omagh
Mullaghmenagh Upper	228	Omagh East	Drumragh	Omagh
Mullaghmore	646	Omagh East	Clogherny	Omagh
Mullaghmore	453	Strabane Upper	Cappagh	Omagh
Mullaghmore	397	Dungannon Middle	Donaghmore	Dungannon
Mullaghmore	269	Clogher	Clogher	Clogher
Mullaghmore	266	Clogher	Aghalurcher	Clogher
Mullaghmore	215	Omagh East	Drumragh	Omagh
Mullaghmore East	347	Dungannon Lower	Aghaloo	Armagh
Mullaghmore Glebe	204	Dungannon Middle	Donaghmore	Dungannon
Mullaghmore West	127	Dungannon Lower	Aghaloo	Clogher
Mullaghmossagh	193	Dungannon Lower	Aghaloo	Armagh
Mullaghmossog Glebe	62	Dungannon Middle	Clonfeacle	Dungannon
Mullaghmoyle	319	Dungannon Middle	Donaghenry	Dungannon
Mullaghnese	180	Dungannon Lower	Carnteel	Dungannon
Mullaghroddan	227	Dungannon Middle	Donaghmore	Dungannon
Mullaghshantullagh	42	Dungannon Upper	Desertcreat	Cookstown
Mullaghslin Glebe	2,368	Omagh East	Clogherny	Omagh
Mullaghteige	175	Dungannon Middle	Killyman	Dungannon
Mullaghtinny	187	Clogher	Clogher	Clogher
Mullaghtironey	254	Dungannon Upper	Tamlaght	Cookstown
Mullaghwotragh	247	Dungannon Upper	Arboe	Cookstown
Mullan Lower	288	Dungannon Upper	Ballinderry	Cookstown
Mullan Upper	276	Dungannon Upper	Ballinderry	Cookstown
Mullanabreen	291	Omagh West	Termonamongan	Castlederg
Mullanahoe	321	Dungannon Upper	Arboe	Cookstown
Mullanatoomog	645	Omagh East	Drumragh	Omagh
Mullanbeg	342	Omagh East	Termonmaguirk	Omagh
Mullanboy	478	Clogher	Donacavey	Omagh
Mullanboy	231	Omagh East	Dromore	Omagh
Mullanmore	888	Omagh East	Termonmaguirk	Omagh
Mullans	142	Clogher	Clogher	Clogher
Mullans	82	Clogher	Donacavey	Omagh
Mullans (or Killyfaddy)	163	Clogher	Clogher	Clogher
Mullantain	99	Dungannon Middle	Donaghenry	Cookstown
Mullasiloga	144	Clogher	Donacavey	Omagh
Mullawinny	411	Omagh East	Donacavey	Omagh
Mullintor	208	Dungannon Lower	Aghaloo	Dungannon
Mullybrannon	277	Dungannon Middle	Clonfeacle	Dungannon
Mullycar	304	Dungannon Middle	Clonfeacle	Dungannon
Mullycarnan	372	Dungannon Lower	Aghaloo	Dungannon
Mullycarnan	123	Dungannon Middle	Clonfeacle	Dungannon
Mullycrunnet	100	Dungannon Middle	Donaghmore	Dungannon
Mullyfabeg	564	Omagh West	Termonamongan	Castlederg
Mullyfamore	798	Omagh West	Termonamongan	Castlederg
Mullygruen	118	Dungannon Middle	Donaghmore	Dungannon
Mullynaveagh	128	Dungannon Lower	Aghaloo	Armagh
Mullyneill	339	Dungannon Lower	Aghaloo	Dungannon
Mullynure	164	Dungannon Upper	Desertcreat	Cookstown
Mullyroddan	308	Dungannon Lower	Killeeshil	Dungannon
Mullysilly	139	Dungannon Lower	Killeeshil	Dungannon
Mulnafye	327	Omagh East	Termonmaguirk	Omagh
Mulnagoagh	246	Omagh East	Dromore	Omagh
Mulnagore	291	Dungannon Middle	Pomeroy	Dungannon
Mulnagork	122	Omagh East	Kilskeery	Enniskillen
Mulnahorn	455	Dungannon Lower	Aghaloo	Clogher
Mulnahunch	245	Dungannon Lower	Killeeshil	Dungannon
Mulvin	232	Strabane Lower	Ardstraw	Strabane
Munderrydoe	255	Dungannon Middle	Pomeroy	Cookstown
Munie	158	Omagh West	Urney	Castlederg
Muntober	613	Dungannon Upper	Kildress	Cookstown
Murnells	770	Dungannon Upper	Kildress	Cookstown

== N ==
Townland	Acres	Barony	Civil parish	Poor law union
New Buildings	123	Dungannon Upper	Derryloran	Cookstown
New Park	339	Omagh East	Dromore	Omagh
Newry	161	Clogher	Clogher	Clogher
**Newtown Stewart**	Town	Strabane Lower	Ardstraw	Strabane
Newtown Stewart	540	Strabane Lower	Ardstraw	Strabane
North & South Lislea	426	Strabane Upper	Bodoney Upper	Gortin
Nurchossy Irish	250	Clogher	Clogher	Clogher
Nurchossy Scotch	141	Clogher	Clogher	Clogher

== O ==
Townland	Acres	Barony	Civil parish	Poor law union
Oaghmonicroy	756	Strabane Upper	Bodoney Lower	Gortin
Oaklands	185	Dungannon Upper	Kildress	Cookstown
Oghill	164	Dungannon Upper	Ballyclog	Cookstown
Old Church Yard	1	Omagh East	Termonmaguirk	Omagh
**Omagh**	Town	Omagh East	Drumragh	Omagh
Omagh	31	Omagh East	Drumragh	Omagh
Oritor	289	Dungannon Upper	Kildress	Cookstown
Oughtboy	964	Strabane Upper	Bodoney Upper	Gortin
Oughtdoorish	1,848	Strabane Upper	Bodoney Upper	Gortin
Oughterard	326	Omagh East	Dromore	Omagh
Oughterard	152	Dungannon Upper	Desertcreat	Cookstown
Oughtmame	823	Strabane Upper	Bodoney Upper	Gortin
Oughtnamwella	1,368	Strabane Upper	Bodoney Upper	Gortin
Outlands of Grevally	63	Dungannon Middle	Donaghenry	Cookstown
Owenreagh	767	Strabane Lower	Leckpatrick	Strabane
Oxtown	350	Omagh East	Termonmaguirk	Omagh

== P ==
Townland	Acres	Barony	Civil parish	Poor law union
Parker's Farm	16	Dungannon Middle	Donaghenry	Cookstown
Peacockbank	154	Strabane Lower	Urney	Strabane
Plaister	226	Dungannon Lower	Carnteel	Clogher
Polfore	333	Omagh East	Dromore	Omagh
Pollockstown	96	Strabane Lower	Leckpatrick	Strabane
**Pomeroy**	Town	Dungannon Middle	Pomeroy	Cookstown
Pomeroy	273	Dungannon Upper	Desertcreat	Cookstown
Pomeroy	57	Dungannon Middle	Pomeroy	Cookstown
Priestsessagh	456	Strabane Lower	Ardstraw	Castlederg
Prolusk	239	Clogher	Clogher	Clogher
Prospect	130	Strabane Lower	Urney	Strabane
Prughlish	478	Omagh West	Longfield West	Castlederg
Pubble	425	Strabane Lower	Ardstraw	Gortin
Pullateebee	270	Strabane Lower	Leckpatrick	Strabane
Pullyernan	1,359	Omagh West	Urney	Castlederg

== Q ==
Townland	Acres	Barony	Civil parish	Poor law union
Quiggy	613	Strabane Upper	Bodoney Upper	Gortin
Quintinmanus	61	Dungannon Middle	Tullyniskan	Dungannon

== R ==
Townland	Acres	Barony	Civil parish	Poor law union
Rabstown	206	Strabane Lower	Urney	Strabane
Racolpa	457	Strabane Upper	Cappagh	Omagh
Racrane	73	Clogher	Donacavey	Omagh
Radergan	919	Omagh East	Clogherny	Omagh
Rahack Glebe	195	Clogher	Aghalurcher	Clogher
Rahony	734	Omagh East	Dromore	Omagh
Rahoran	307	Clogher	Clogher	Clogher
Rakeeragh	142	Omagh East	Drumragh	Omagh
Rakeeranbeg	180	Omagh East	Dromore	Omagh
Rakelly	316	Strabane Lower	Ardstraw	Strabane
Ramackan	1,208	Omagh East	Termonmaguirk	Omagh
Ramaket	143	Dungannon Lower	Aghaloo	Armagh
Ranaghan	137	Dungannon Middle	Drumglass	Dungannon
Raneese	419	Clogher	Donacavey	Omagh
Ranelly	315	Omagh East	Clogherny	Omagh
Ranenly	116	Clogher	Clogher	Clogher
Rarogan	305	Clogher	Errigal Keerogue	Clogher
Rarone	153	Omagh East	Clogherny	Omagh
Rathfraggan	393	Clogher	Donacavey	Omagh
Rathwarren	228	Clogher	Donacavey	Omagh
Ratory	156	Clogher	Clogher	Clogher
Ratyn	198	Strabane Lower	Ardstraw	Castlederg
Raveagh	240	Clogher	Donacavey	Clogher
Ravellea	470	Dungannon Lower	Carnteel	Clogher
Raw	367	Omagh East	Clogherny	Omagh
Reaghan	567	Strabane Upper	Cappagh	Omagh
Realtons	292	Omagh East	Kilskeery	Enniskillen
Reaskcor	168	Dungannon Middle	Donaghmore	Dungannon
Reaskmore	327	Dungannon Middle	Donaghmore	Dungannon
Recarson	405	Omagh East	Cappagh	Omagh
Reclain	298	Dungannon Middle	Donaghmore	Dungannon
Rehaghy	579	Dungannon Lower	Aghaloo	Dungannon
Relagh	279	Omagh East	Kilskeery	Enniskillen
Relagh Guinness	458	Omagh East	Kilskeery	Lowtherstown
Relaghdooey	226	Omagh East	Drumragh	Omagh
Relessy	354	Clogher	Aghalurcher	Clogher
Reloagh	160	Dungannon Middle	Donaghmore	Dungannon
Reskatirriff	306	Dungannon Lower	Carnteel	Dungannon
Richmond	266	Clogher	Errigal Keerogue	Clogher
Riverstown	57	Omagh East	Drumragh	Omagh
Roan	127	Dungannon Middle	Clonfeacle	Dungannon
Rockdale	123	Dungannon Upper	Desertcreat	Cookstown
Rockhead	82	Dungannon Upper	Derryloran	Cookstown
Roscavey	1,126	Omagh East	Clogherny	Omagh
Roscor	251	Omagh East	Magheracross	Lowtherstown
Rosemeilan	199	Clogher	Clogher	Clogher
Rosnamuck	219	Strabane Upper	Cappagh	Omagh
Ross	180	Dungannon Middle	Donaghenry	Cookstown
Ross Beg	207	Dungannon Middle	Drumglass	Dungannon
Ross More	111	Dungannon Middle	Drumglass	Dungannon
Rossnareen	258	Omagh East	Kilskeery	Enniskillen
Rough Hill	59	Clogher	Errigal Keerogue	Clogher
Roughan	312	Dungannon Middle	Donaghenry	Dungannon
Roughan	257	Clogher	Errigal Keerogue	Clogher
Roughan	105	Clogher	Donacavey	Omagh
Roundhill	131	Strabane Lower	Leckpatrick	Strabane
Rousky	322	Strabane Lower	Donaghedy	Strabane
Rousky	295	Strabane Upper	Bodoney Lower	Gortin
Rousky	133	Dungannon Lower	Carnteel	Clogher
Rousky	112	Dungannon Upper	Donaghenry	Cookstown
Rouskyroe	67	Dungannon Middle	Donaghenry	Cookstown
Roy	65	Clogher	Clogher	Clogher
Rylagh	756	Strabane Upper	Cappagh	Omagh
Rylands	632	Strabane Upper	Bodoney Lower	Gortin
Rylands	242	Omagh East	Drumragh	Omagh

== S ==
Townland	Acres	Barony	Civil parish	Poor law union
Sanaghanroe	206	Dungannon Middle	Clonfeacle	Dungannon
Sandville	113	Strabane Lower	Donaghedy	Strabane
Sawelabeg	456	Strabane Upper	Bodoney Upper	Gortin
Scallen	342	Omagh East	Kilskeery	Lowtherstown
Scarvagherin	451	Strabane Lower	Ardstraw	Castlederg
Scotchtown	20	Dungannon Upper	Derryloran	Cookstown
Scotstown	84	Strabane Lower	Urney	Strabane
Scraghy	2,081	Omagh West	Termonamongan	Castlederg
Scralea	272	Omagh West	Termonamongan	Castlederg
Screeby	306	Omagh East	Kilskeery	Enniskillen
Screeby	242	Clogher	Clogher	Clogher
Screggagh	509	Clogher	Donacavey	Omagh
Second Croagh (or Sixth Corgary)	2,111	Omagh West	Termonamongan	Castlederg
Sedennan	182	Omagh East	Drumragh	Omagh
Seegronan	700	Omagh West	Termonamongan	Castlederg
Seein	461	Strabane Lower	Urney	Strabane
Segully	513	Omagh West	Longfield East	Omagh
**Seskinore**	Town	Omagh East	Clogherny	Omagh
Seskinore	870	Omagh East	Clogherny	Omagh
Sess	311	Clogher	Clogher	Clogher
Sess	70	Clogher	Errigal Keerogue	Clogher
Sess Kilgreen	57	Clogher	Errigal Keerogue	Clogher
Sessagh of Gallan	205	Strabane Lower	Ardstraw	Gortin
Sessia	137	Dungannon Upper	Arboe	Cookstown
Sessia	92	Clogher	Clogher	Clogher
Sessia	73	Dungannon Middle	Donaghenry	Cookstown
Sessia	56	Dungannon Upper	Arboe	Cookstown
Sessia	52	Dungannon Middle	Tullyniskan	Dungannon
Sessia (Murphy)	83	Dungannon Upper	Desertcreat	Cookstown
Sessia (Scott)	178	Dungannon Upper	Desertcreat	Cookstown
Sessiadonaghy	420	Dungannon Middle	Pomeroy	Dungannon
Sessiagh	107	Clogher	Donacavey	Omagh
Sessiaghs (or Magheragart)	190	Omagh East	Dromore	Omagh
Sessiamagaroll	268	Dungannon Middle	Clonfeacle	Dungannon
Seyloran	95	Dungannon Middle	Clonfeacle	Dungannon
Shanaghy	324	Omagh West	Termonamongan	Castlederg
Shanalurg	103	Dungannon Lower	Carnteel	Dungannon
Shanco	160	Clogher	Clogher	Clogher
Shankey	95	Dungannon Middle	Donaghenry	Cookstown
Shanliss Lower	134	Dungannon Middle	Clonoe	Dungannon
Shanliss Upper	141	Dungannon Middle	Clonoe	Dungannon
Shanmaghry	426	Dungannon Middle	Pomeroy	Dungannon
Shanmoy	118	Dungannon Middle	Clonfeacle	Dungannon
Shanmullagh East	532	Omagh East	Kilskeery	Lowtherstown
Shanmullagh Glebe	142	Omagh East	Dromore	Omagh
Shanmullagh West	508	Omagh East	Kilskeery	Lowtherstown
Shannaragh	936	Omagh East	Dromore	Omagh
Shanog	68	Omagh West	Ardstraw	Castlederg
Shanonny East	338	Strabane Lower	Ardstraw	Gortin
Shanonny West	273	Strabane Lower	Ardstraw	Strabane
Shantavny	160	Dungannon Lower	Carnteel	Clogher
Shantavny Irish	790	Clogher	Errigal Keerogue	Clogher
Shantavny Scotch	587	Clogher	Errigal Keerogue	Clogher
Shantonagh	346	Clogher	Clogher	Clogher
Sheridan	91	Omagh East	Magheracross	Lowtherstown
Sherrigrim	399	Dungannon Middle	Donaghenry	Cookstown
Sheskinshule	824	Strabane Upper	Bodoney Lower	Gortin
Shivey	151	Dungannon Upper	Desertcreat	Cookstown
Silverhill	151	Strabane Lower	Leckpatrick	Strabane
**Six Mile Cross**	Town	Omagh East	Termonmaguirk	Omagh
Six Mile Cross	199	Omagh East	Termonmaguirk	Omagh
Sixth Corgary (or Second Croagh)	2,111	Omagh West	Termonamongan	Castlederg
Skea	200	Dungannon Middle	Pomeroy	Dungannon
Skeboy	262	Omagh East	Termonmaguirk	Omagh
Skelgagh	234	Omagh East	Donacavey	Omagh
Skelgagh	225	Clogher	Clogher	Clogher
Skenahergny	258	Dungannon Upper	Desertcreat	Cookstown
Skenarget	93	Dungannon Upper	Desertcreat	Cookstown
Skeogue	467	Omagh East	Dromore	Lowtherstown
Skerryglass	87	Strabane Lower	Urney	Strabane
Skey	262	Dungannon Lower	Carnteel	Clogher
Skinboy	152	Strabane Lower	Ardstraw	Strabane
Skinboy Mountain	242	Strabane Lower	Ardstraw	Strabane
Skreen	201	Omagh East	Donacavey	Omagh
Slaghtfreeden	2,302	Dungannon Upper	Lissan	Cookstown
Slatbeg	753	Clogher	Clogher	Clogher
Slatmore	405	Clogher	Clogher	Clogher
Slievedoo	4,559	Omagh West	Termonamongan	Castlederg
Sloughan	687	Omagh West	Longfield West	Castlederg
Sluggan	1,176	Omagh East	Termonmaguirk	Omagh
Soarn	102	Dungannon Middle	Donaghenry	Cookstown
Sollus	136	Strabane Lower	Donaghedy	Strabane
Somervillestown	89	Strabane Lower	Urney	Strabane
Spamount	88	Omagh West	Ardstraw	Castlederg
Speerholme	163	Omagh West	Termonamongan	Castlederg
Springtown	164	Clogher	Clogher	Clogher
Sraghcumber	317	Omagh West	Termonamongan	Castlederg
Stakernagh	235	Dungannon Middle	Donaghmore	Dungannon
Stangmore (Knox)	214	Dungannon Middle	Clonfeacle	Dungannon
Stangmore (Magee)	90	Dungannon Middle	Clonfeacle	Dungannon
Stephenstown	125	Strabane Lower	Urney	Strabane
Stevenson's Dowery	106	Dungannon Middle	Donaghenry	Cookstown
**Stewartstown**	Town	Dungannon Middle	Donaghenry	Cookstown
Stiloga	439	Dungannon Middle	Clonfeacle	Dungannon
Stonebrack	571	Strabane Lower	Donaghedy	Gortin
Stonewalls	130	Strabane Lower	Ardstraw	Strabane
Stonyfalls	183	Strabane Lower	Ardstraw	Strabane
Stonyfalls	123	Strabane Lower	Donaghedy	Strabane
Stonypath	90	Strabane Lower	Leckpatrick	Strabane
**Strabane**	Town	Strabane Lower	Camus	Strabane
**Strabane**	Town	Strabane Lower	Leckpatrick	Strabane
**Strabane**	Town	Strabane Lower	Urney	Strabane
Strabane	136	Clogher	Donacavey	Omagh
Strabane Bog	84	Strabane Lower	Leckpatrick	Strabane
Strabane, Townparks of	417	Strabane Lower	Camus	Strabane
Stradowan	1,309	Strabane Upper	Bodoney Lower	Gortin
Straduff	324	Omagh East	Dromore	Omagh
Stragrane	172	Dungannon Lower	Aghaloo	Armagh
Stragullin	174	Strabane Lower	Camus	Strabane
Strahull	361	Strabane Upper	Bodoney Upper	Gortin
Strahulter	319	Strabane Lower	Ardstraw	Gortin
Straletterdallan	685	Strabane Lower	Ardstraw	Gortin
Stralongford	288	Omagh East	Kilskeery	Lowtherstown
Stranabrosny	132	Strabane Lower	Donaghedy	Strabane
Stranagalwilly	3,129	Strabane Lower	Cumber Upper	Gortin
Stranagummer	260	Omagh East	Kilskeery	Lowtherstown
Stranisk	778	Clogher	Donacavey	Omagh
Stranisk	159	Strabane Lower	Leckpatrick	Strabane
Stratigore	111	Clogher	Donacavey	Omagh
Straughroy	186	Strabane Upper	Cappagh	Omagh
Straws	391	Dungannon Upper	Kildress	Cookstown
Streefe Glebe	376	Omagh East	Termonmaguirk	Omagh
Strifehill	66	Dungannon Upper	Derryloran	Cookstown
Stroancarbadagh	206	Omagh East	Drumragh	Omagh
Stuart Hall	143	Dungannon Upper	Arboe	Cookstown
Stughan	141	Dungannon Middle	Tullyniskan	Dungannon
Sullenboy	55	Dungannon Upper	Derryloran	Cookstown
Sultan	2,252	Omagh East	Termonmaguirk	Omagh
Syerla	174	Dungannon Middle	Clonfeacle	Dungannon
Syonee	190	Clogher	Donacavey	Omagh
Syonfin	249	Clogher	Donacavey	Omagh
Syunshin	286	Clogher	Clogher	Clogher

== T ==
Townland	Acres	Barony	Civil parish	Poor law union
Taboe Glebe	681	Strabane Lower	Donaghedy	Strabane
Tamlaght	462	Omagh East	Drumragh	Omagh
Tamlaght	383	Clogher	Clogher	Clogher
Tamlaght	142	Dungannon Upper	Kildress	Cookstown
Tamlaghtmore	526	Dungannon Middle	Killyman	Dungannon
Tamlaghtmore	261	Dungannon Upper	Arboe	Cookstown
Tamnabrady	322	Strabane Lower	Donaghedy	Strabane
Tamnabryan	237	Strabane Lower	Donaghedy	Strabane
Tamnaclare	315	Strabane Lower	Donaghedy	Strabane
Tamnagh	186	Strabane Lower	Ardstraw	Strabane
Tamnakeery	239	Strabane Lower	Donaghedy	Strabane
Tamnaskeeny	393	Dungannon Upper	Kildress	Cookstown
Tamnavally	249	Dungannon Upper	Arboe	Cookstown
Tamnyhagan	45	Dungannon Upper	Lissan	Cookstown
Tamylennan	167	Dungannon Middle	Donaghenry	Cookstown
Tanderagee	565	Omagh East	Termonmaguirk	Omagh
Tanderagee	279	Dungannon Middle	Pomeroy	Cookstown
Tannagh	258	Dungannon Lower	Aghaloo	Dungannon
Tannaghlane	365	Dungannon Lower	Aghaloo	Armagh
Tantramurry	230	Strabane Upper	Cappagh	Omagh
Tarlum	252	Omagh East	Drumragh	Omagh
Tartlaghan	144	Dungannon Middle	Killyman	Dungannon
Tatnadaveny	743	Clogher	Clogher	Clogher
Tatnagilta	127	Dungannon Upper	Lissan	Cookstown
Tattanafinnell	827	Clogher	Clogher	Clogher
Tattanellan	111	Clogher	Aghalurcher	Clogher
Tattraconnaghty	253	Strabane Upper	Cappagh	Omagh
Tattycor	355	Omagh East	Dromore	Omagh
Tattykeel	321	Dungannon Upper	Kildress	Cookstown
Tattykeel	302	Omagh East	Drumragh	Omagh
Tattykeel (Buchanan)	319	Omagh East	Drumragh	Omagh
Tattykeel (Rogers)	688	Omagh East	Drumragh	Omagh
Tattykeeran	603	Omagh East	Clogherny	Omagh
Tattymoyle Lower	502	Clogher	Donacavey	Omagh
Tattymoyle Middle	561	Clogher	Donacavey	Omagh
Tattymoyle Upper	468	Clogher	Donacavey	Omagh
Tattymulmona	241	Omagh East	Donacavey	Omagh
Tattynagole	129	Strabane Upper	Cappagh	Omagh
Tattynure	373	Strabane Upper	Cappagh	Omagh
Tattyreagh Glebe	906	Omagh East	Drumragh	Omagh
Tattysallagh	949	Omagh East	Drumragh	Omagh
Tawnymore	350	Clogher	Clogher	Clogher
Teebane	361	Dungannon Upper	Kildress	Cookstown
Teebane East	779	Strabane Upper	Bodoney Lower	Gortin
Teebane West	1,077	Strabane Upper	Bodoney Lower	Gortin
Tempanroe	122	Dungannon Middle	Killyman	Dungannon
Templereagh	85	Dungannon Middle	Donaghenry	Cookstown
**Termon Rock**	Town	Omagh East	Termonmaguirk	Omagh
Terrenew	248	Dungannon Middle	Donaghmore	Dungannon
Terrew	63	Clogher	Clogher	Clogher
Terryglassog	263	Dungannon Middle	Clonfeacle	Dungannon
Terryscollop	240	Dungannon Middle	Clonfeacle	Dungannon
Terrywinny	120	Dungannon Upper	Kildress	Cookstown
The Bonn	58	Dungannon Middle	Pomeroy	Cookstown
The Gort (or Eglish)	74	Dungannon Upper	Ballinderry	Cookstown
Thornhill Glebe	118	Dungannon Middle	Pomeroy	Dungannon
Tievebrack	1,220	Strabane Upper	Bodoney Lower	Gortin
Tievenagh	76	Dungannon Upper	Artrea	Cookstown
Tievenagh (part of)	26	Dungannon Upper	Artrea	Cookstown
Tievenameena	844	Strabane Upper	Bodoney Lower	Gortin
Tievenameenta	275	Omagh West	Termonamongan	Castlederg
Tievenny	475	Strabane Lower	Ardstraw	Strabane
Timpany	248	Clogher	Aghalurcher	Clogher
Tircar	179	Clogher	Aghalurcher	Clogher
Tirconnelly	259	Strabane Lower	Donaghedy	Strabane
Tircur	400	Strabane Upper	Cappagh	Omagh
Tireenan	251	Clogher	Donacavey	Omagh
Tirelugan	487	Dungannon Lower	Carnteel	Clogher
Tirkernaghan	906	Strabane Lower	Donaghedy	Strabane
Tirmacshane	71	Dungannon Upper	Kildress	Cookstown
Tirmegan	125	Strabane Lower	Ardstraw	Strabane
Tirmurty	459	Strabane Upper	Cappagh	Omagh
Tirnaskea	319	Clogher	Errigal Keerogue	Clogher
Tirnaskea	149	Dungannon Upper	Desertcreat	Cookstown
Tirnaskea (Bayly)	279	Dungannon Upper	Desertcreat	Cookstown
Tiroony	323	Omagh East	Termonmaguirk	Omagh
Tirquin	528	Strabane Upper	Cappagh	Omagh
Toberlane	192	Dungannon Upper	Derryloran	Cookstown
Tobermesson Glebe	250	Dungannon Middle	Clonfeacle	Dungannon
Tolvin	175	Dungannon Upper	Desertcreat	Cookstown
Tonegan	396	Omagh East	Termonmaguirk	Omagh
Tonnagh Beg	227	Clogher	Donacavey	Omagh
Tonnagh More	317	Omagh East	Donacavey	Omagh
Tonnaghbane	38	Clogher	Donacavey	Omagh
Toomog	217	Dungannon Middle	Donaghmore	Dungannon
Town Parks	443	Strabane Lower	Leckpatrick	Strabane
Townagh	91	Clogher	Clogher	Clogher
Townparks of Strabane	417	Strabane Lower	Camus	Strabane
Tremoge	1,889	Omagh East	Termonmaguirk	Omagh
Trickvallen	279	Dungannon Upper	Arboe	Cookstown
Trienamongan	290	Omagh West	Termonamongan	Castlederg
**Trillick**	Town	Omagh East	Kilskeery	Lowtherstown
Trinamadan	956	Strabane Upper	Bodoney Lower	Gortin
True	174	Dungannon Middle	Killyman	Dungannon
Tullagh	158	Dungannon Upper	Derryloran	Cookstown
Tullagh Beg	257	Dungannon Middle	Donaghenry	Cookstown
Tullagh More	235	Dungannon Middle	Donaghenry	Cookstown
Tullagherin	937	Strabane Upper	Bodoney Upper	Gortin
Tullanafoile	515	Clogher	Clogher	Clogher
Tullanavert	246	Clogher	Clogher	Clogher
Tully	747	Omagh West	Longfield West	Castlederg
Tully	409	Strabane Upper	Cappagh	Omagh
Tully	236	Dungannon Lower	Carnteel	Clogher
Tully	148	Clogher	Clogher	Clogher
Tully	76	Dungannon Upper	Desertcreat	Cookstown
Tullyallen	224	Dungannon Middle	Donaghmore	Dungannon
Tullyaran	288	Dungannon Middle	Donaghmore	Dungannon
Tullyard	487	Strabane Lower	Donaghedy	Strabane
Tullyard	411	Omagh West	Longfield West	Castlederg
Tullyard	248	Strabane Lower	Leckpatrick	Strabane
Tullyard	154	Dungannon Upper	Desertcreat	Cookstown
Tullyblety	328	Dungannon Lower	Aghaloo	Dungannon
Tullybroom	198	Clogher	Clogher	Clogher
Tullybryan	150	Clogher	Errigal Keerogue	Clogher
Tullycall	322	Dungannon Upper	Derryloran	Cookstown
Tullycar	854	Omagh West	Termonamongan	Castlederg
Tullyclunagh	357	Omagh East	Dromore	Omagh
Tullyconnell	192	Dungannon Upper	Artrea	Cookstown
Tullycorker	304	Clogher	Clogher	Clogher
Tullycullion	105	Dungannon Middle	Drumglass	Dungannon
Tullycunny	130	Omagh East	Drumragh	Omagh
Tullydoortans	338	Strabane Lower	Urney	Strabane
Tullydowey	205	Dungannon Middle	Clonfeacle	Dungannon
Tullydraw	144	Dungannon Middle	Donaghmore	Dungannon
Tullyfaughan	43	Dungannon Middle	Donaghenry	Cookstown
Tullygare	60	Dungannon Upper	Derryloran	Cookstown
Tullygiven	360	Dungannon Middle	Clonfeacle	Dungannon
Tullyglush	184	Clogher	Errigal Keerogue	Clogher
Tullygoney	207	Dungannon Middle	Clonfeacle	Dungannon
Tullygun	82	Dungannon Middle	Drumglass	Dungannon
Tullyheeran	275	Omagh East	Clogherny	Omagh
**Tullyhog**	Town	Dungannon Upper	Desertcreat	Cookstown
Tullyhog	120	Dungannon Upper	Desertcreat	Cookstown
Tullyhurken	67	Dungannon Upper	Artrea	Cookstown
Tullylagan	124	Dungannon Upper	Desertcreat	Cookstown
Tullylearn	150	Dungannon Middle	Clonfeacle	Dungannon
Tullyleek	281	Dungannon Middle	Donaghmore	Dungannon
Tullylig	131	Dungannon Middle	Donaghenry	Cookstown
Tullylinton	176	Clogher	Errigal Keerogue	Clogher
Tullymagough	113	Omagh East	Dromore	Lowtherstown
Tullymoan	381	Strabane Lower	Urney	Strabane
Tullymuck	804	Strabane Lower	Ardstraw	Omagh
Tullynadall	449	Strabane Upper	Bodoney Upper	Gortin
Tullynashane	153	Dungannon Lower	Aghaloo	Armagh
Tullyninerin	226	Omagh East	Kilskeery	Lowtherstown
Tullynure	151	Dungannon Middle	Donaghmore	Dungannon
Tullyodonnell	295	Dungannon Upper	Desertcreat	Cookstown
Tullyodonnell	76	Dungannon Middle	Drumglass	Dungannon
Tullyquin Glebe	240	Clogher	Clogher	Clogher
Tullyraw	63	Dungannon Upper	Artrea	Cookstown
Tullyreavy	242	Dungannon Upper	Desertcreat	Cookstown
Tullyremon	205	Dungannon Lower	Aghaloo	Armagh
Tullyroan	73	Dungannon Upper	Kildress	Cookstown
Tullyrush	480	Omagh East	Clogherny	Omagh
Tullyrush	198	Clogher	Donacavey	Omagh
Tullyvally	283	Clogher	Donacavey	Omagh
Tullyvannon	448	Dungannon Lower	Killeeshil	Dungannon
Tullyvar	313	Dungannon Lower	Carnteel	Clogher
Tullyveagh	158	Dungannon Upper	Artrea	Cookstown
Tullyvernan	171	Clogher	Clogher	Clogher
Tullywee	133	Omagh East	Dromore	Lowtherstown
Tullyweery	68	Dungannon Upper	Artrea	Cookstown
Tullywhisker	517	Strabane Lower	Urney	Strabane
Tullywiggan	159	Dungannon Upper	Derryloran	Cookstown
Tullywinny	195	Dungannon Lower	Carnteel	Clogher
Tullywolly	177	Omagh East	Kilskeery	Lowtherstown
Tulnacross	543	Dungannon Upper	Kildress	Cookstown
Tulnagall	227	Dungannon Middle	Pomeroy	Dungannon
Tulnashane	560	Omagh West	Termonamongan	Castlederg
Tulnavern	896	Dungannon Lower	Carnteel	Dungannon
Tummery	819	Omagh East	Dromore	Lowtherstown
Tumpher	146	Dungannon Middle	Clonoe	Dungannon
Turleenan	153	Dungannon Middle	Clonfeacle	Dungannon
Turnabarson	607	Dungannon Middle	Pomeroy	Cookstown
Tursallagh	117	Omagh East	Termonmaguirk	Omagh
Tycanny	615	Clogher	Clogher	Clogher
Tyhan	216	Dungannon Middle	Clonfeacle	Dungannon

== U ==
Townland	Acres	Barony	Civil parish	Poor law union
Unagh	349	Dungannon Upper	Lissan	Cookstown
Unicks	65	Dungannon Middle	Donaghenry	Cookstown
Unshinagh	772	Omagh West	Longfield East	Omagh
Upperthird	187	Omagh West	Ardstraw	Castlederg
Urbal	240	Dungannon Upper	Tamlaght	Cookstown
Urbalreagh	537	Strabane Lower	Ardstraw	Strabane
Urbalreagh	57	Dungannon Middle	Donaghenry	Cookstown
Urney	188	Strabane Lower	Urney	Strabane
Urney Glebe	124	Strabane Lower	Urney	Strabane
Usnagh	317	Omagh East	Clogherny	Omagh

== W ==
Townland	Acres	Barony	Civil parish	Poor law union
Whitehouse	271	Strabane Lower	Ardstraw	Castlederg
Whitetown	124	Dungannon Middle	Tullyniskan	Dungannon
Willmount	189	Omagh West	Longfield West	Castlederg
Windyhill	150	Strabane Lower	Donaghedy	Strabane
Woodbrook	413	Strabane Upper	Bodoney Lower	Gortin
Woodend	277	Strabane Lower	Leckpatrick	Strabane
Woodhill	61	Dungannon Middle	Tullyniskan	Dungannon
Woodside	252	Omagh West	Termonamongan	Castlederg
