= List of archaeological sites in County Tyrone =

List of archaeological sites in County Tyrone, Northern Ireland:

== A ==
- Aghafad, Rath, grid ref: H4603 5800
- Aghagogan, Wedge tomb, grid ref: H6391 7360 and standing stone, grid ref: H6398 7351
- Aghalane, Standing stone, stone circle, alignments and cist, grid ref: H4946 9260
- Aghalane, Court tomb: Cloghogle, grid ref: H5473 7854
- Aghaloo Church, in Rousky townland, grid ref: H6634 5494
- Aghalunny, Bridge: Fairy Bridge, grid ref: H1695 7985
- Aghascrebagh, Prehistoric burial monument: ‘Pagan Graveyard’, grid ref: H6162 8381
- Aghascrebagh, Ogham stone, grid ref: H6178 8390
- Aghascrebagh, Standing stone, grid ref: H6166 8397
- Aghintain, Fortified house, grid ref: H4985 5151
- Aghnagreggan, Court tomb, grid ref: H4985 5151
- Aghnahoo and Leitrim, Souterrain, grid ref: H2263 8032
- Ally, Court tomb, grid ref: H2570 7242
- Altanagh, Burial mound, grid ref: H6266 6936
- Altcloghfin, Portal tomb, grid ref: H5643 6244
- Altdrumman, Portal tomb: Cloghogle, grid ref: H5778 7679
- Altdrumman, Wedge tomb and court tomb, grid ref: H5588 7626
- Altmore (alias Barracktown), Megalith, grid ref: H6710 6936 and court tomb, grid ref: H6686 6961
- Annagh, Rectangular earthwork, H5083 6651
- Annagh More, Crannog, grid ref: H6988 5465
- Ardboe High Cross, Ecclesiastical site: environs of Ardboe Cross and abbey, Farsnagh and Sessia townland, grid ref: H9660 7562
- Aughnacarney, Rath, grid ref:H5540 5164

== B ==
- Balix Lower, Cashel, grid ref: H4921 9757
- Balix Lower, Court tomb: ‘The White Rocks’ (area surrounding the state care monument), grid ref: H4836 9635
- Ballyclog Old Church, Church, Glebe townland, grid ref: H8660 7369
- Ballygawley Castle, grid ref: H6324 5749
- Ballygowan, Counterscarp raths (2), grid refs: H4297 7235 and H4344 7191
- Ballykeery, Killeen, grid ref: H4492 9540
- Ballynabwee, Counterscarp rath, grid ref: C4090 0500
- Ballynamallaght, Prehistoric landscape, standing stone, cairns and field walls, grid ref: Area of H510 988
- Ballynatubbrit, Ring barrow, grid ref: H4469 8331
- Ballyness, Standing stone, grid ref: H4592 5312
- Ballyrenan, Portal tomb: Cloghogle, grid ref: H3732 8317
- Ballywholan, Court tomb: ‘Carnagat’ (area surrounding the state care monument), grid ref: H5786 8166
- Beaghmore, Cairns (2), grid refs: H6872 8470 and H6856 8472
- Beaghmore, Stone circles, alignments and cairns, grid ref: Area of H684 842
- Beaghmore, Round cairn with standing stones: Bradley's Cairn, grid ref: H6830 8401
- Beaghmore, Cairn and alignment, grid ref: H6863 8431
- Beleevna Beg, Concentric stone circles, grid ref: H6192 8296
- Beltany, Court tomb, grid ref: H4168 8262
- Beltrim, Stone circle and standing stones, grid ref: H4814 8464
- Beragh, Standing stone complex, grid ref: H3919 8122
- Berrysfort, Standing stone (area surrounding the state care monument), grid ref: H2719 8382
- Bloomhill, Rath, grid ref: H5915 5659
- Bodoney, Rath, grid ref: H3181 6517
- Branny, Hilltop enclosure, grid ref: H6826 5556
- Broughderg, Court tomb: Carnanagarranbane, grid ref: H6465 8623
- Broughderg, Stone circle and alignment, grid ref: H6593 8714
- Broughderg, Stone circles, alignments and cairn, grid ref: H6496 8613
- Broughderg, Two stone circles and a standing stone, grid ref: H6535 8482
- Broughderg, Megalithic tomb, grid ref: H6440 8636
- Broughderg, Cist burial and associated features, grid ref: H6772 8697
- Bullock Park, Portal tomb, grid ref: H2778 7892

== C ==
- Cabragh, Large enclosure: Cabragh Fort, grid ref: H2695 5670
- Cadian, Sweat house, grid ref: H7679 5566
- Caldragh Children's Burial Ground, Foremass Lower townland, grid ref: H5837 6607
- Caledon Cross, in Demesne townland, grid ref: H7545 4372
- Caledon, Beam engine, grid ref: H7581 4521
- Camowen, Rath, grid ref: H4924 6844
- Camus, Church, grid ref: H3473 9160
- Cappagh Church, in Dunmullan townland, grid ref: H4493 8021
- Carnanransy, Court tomb: Cloghmore, grid ref: H6246 8550
- Carncorran Glebe, Portal tomb: Giant's Grave, grid ref: H2889 8243
- Carnteel, Church, grid ref: H6944 5460
- Carr, Platform rath, grid ref: H5469 5399
- Carrickayne, Prehistoric landscape, stone circle, alignments and cairns, grid ref: Area of H526 988
- Carrickayne, Prehistoric landscape, cairns and field walls, grid ref: Area of H516 985
- Carrickmore, Graveyard: Relignaman or Relicknaman, grid ref: H6064 7224
- Carrickmore, Graveyard: Relignalaniv, grid ref: H6137 7273
- Carrigans, Court tomb, grid ref: H4218 8076
- Carryglass, Multiple cist cairn: Carnamoghil, grid ref: H3839 5575
- Carryglass, Standing stone: Garranbane, grid ref: H3932 5590
- Carryglass, Wedge tomb and cist, grid ref: H3883 5614
- Cashel, Standing stone: ‘Cloghacarah’, grid ref: H5786 8166
- Cashel, Portal tomb, grid ref: H5794 8106
- Castle Curlews, in Kirlish townland, grid ref: H3196 7579
- Castledamph, Rath, grid ref: H5206 9174
- Castledamph, Stone circles and stone alignment, grid ref: H5216 9236
- Castlederg Castle, Bawn, Castlesessagh townland, grid ref: H2605 8442
- Castlemervyn Demesne, Stone circle, grid ref: H3363 5740
- Castletown, Ring barrow, grid ref: H7054 5631
- Castletown, Eel weir and associated features, grid ref: H7076 8561
- Cavanreagh, Barrow, grid ref: H6108 6699
- Cavanreagh, Standing stones, grid ref: H6090 6701
- Churchtown, Wedge tomb: ‘Todd’s Den’ (area surrounding the state care monument), grid ref: H2688 8565
- Clady Haliday, Court tomb: Carnmore, grid ref: H3423 8874
- Clare, Court tomb: White Stones, grid ref: H5913 7393
- Clogher Demesne, Ecclesiastical site and high crosses: Clochar Mac nDiameni, grid ref: H5376 5156
- Clogher Demesne, Clogher Hillfort (area surrounding the state care monument), grid ref: H5387 5133
- Clogher Demesne, Large hilltop enclosure, grid ref: H5478 5050
- Clogherny, Wedge tomb, grid ref: H4882 9453
- Clogherny, Stone circles, grid ref: H4925 9480
- Clogherny, Crannog, grid ref: H7641 5660
- Clogherny Glebe, Raths (3), grid refs: H5741 9165, H5780 9195 and H5852 9221
- Cloghfin, Portal tomb, grid ref: H5186 7218
- Cloghfin, Rath, grid ref: H6042 6637
- Cloghfin, Standing stones (3), H6024 6736
- Cloghfin, Standing stone (fallen), grid ref: H5990 6725
- Cloghog, Rectangular enclosure – artillery fort?, grid ref: H8711 6683
- Clonfeacle Cross, in Tullydowey townland, grid ref: H8387 5212
- Coalisland Canal, Coalisland Canal basin (part of) and canal reaches (3)
- Coalisland, Colliery chimney, in Annagher townland, grid ref: H8468 6713
- Coalisland, Coalisland Works Chimneys (4), Brackaville and Annagher townlands, grid ref: H4829 6657
- Copney, Stone circles (8), stone circle complex, grid ref: H599 780
- Copney, Stone circles (2) and alignments, grid ref: H5939 7826
- Corboe, Rath, grid ref: H5158 5768
- Corick, Rath and tree-ring, grid ref: H5453 5297
- Corick Abbey, Friary, Corickmore townland, grid ref: H4519 8817
- Corramore, Platform rath, grid ref: H5917 9238
- Corramore, Rath, grid ref: H5878 9229
- Crannogue, Fortified mound, grid ref: H6839 6762
- Cranny, Rath, grid ref: H4739 7246
- Creevelough, Rath, grid ref: H7466 5330
- Cregganconroe, Stone circle, alignment and cairn, grid ref: H6504 7523
- Cregganconroe, Stone circles (2), cairns (2) and alignment, grid ref: H6479 7521
- Creggandevesky, Portal tomb, H6391 7524
- Creggandevesky, Stone structure, grid ref: H6285 7389
- Crew, Platform rath, grid ref: H6056 5731
- Crew Lower, Standing stones, grid ref: H3151 8480
- Crocknafarbrague, Cairn: Carnacalleen, grid ref: H3838 5605
- Crocknafarbrague, Standing stone – possible megalithic tomb, grid ref: H3796 5522
- Crosh, Portal tomb: Cloghogle, grid ref: H4176 8791
- Crouck, Megalithic tomb, grid ref: H6220 8445
- Crouck, Fulacht fiadh (cooking place), grid ref: H6239 8433
- Cullamore, Court tomb: Giant's Grave, grid ref: H5809 4839
- Culvacullion, Stone circles and alignment: ‘standing stones’, grid ref: H4949 8892
- Culvacullion, Stone circle, grid ref: H4928 8933

== D ==
- Davagh Lower, wedge tomb: "Big Man's Grave", grid ref: H7013 9708
- Davagh Lower, Ring cairn, stone circle and alignments, grid ref: H7047 8674
- Deer Park (McCormick), Platform rath, grid ref: H4259 7270
- Deer Park (McCormick), Boulder with hollows: Cloghanachorite, grid ref: H4299 7285
- Deer Park (McCormick), Court tomb, grid ref: H4305 7264
- Dergbrough, ráth, grid ref: H4692 8994
- Dernabane, large enclosure, grid ref: H6632, 5384
- Derryallen, standing stones (3), grid ref: H3088 5313
- Derrydrummond, court tomb: "Giant's Graves", grid ref: H5737 4850
- Derrywoone Castle, Baronscourt townland, grid ref: H3669 8357
- Donaghenry, standing stone, grid ref: H8353 7206
- Doocrock, court tomb, grid ref: H2764 6219
- Doorat, stone circles (2), grid ref: H4926 9689
- Doorat, stone circles (2), standing stone and alignment, grid ref: H4952 9652
- Doorless, ráth, grid ref: H8380 7650
- Dromore, Church, grid ref: H3491 6276
- Drumgormal, bivallate ráth, grid ref: H8735 6984
- Drumragh, Church, grid ref: H4568 6980
- Drumsonnus, henge, grid ref: H2805 5380
- Dunbunrawer, ráth, grid ref: H4626 8605
- Dundivin Glebe, ráths (2), grid ref: H4467 5766
- Dungannon Castle, site of, in Drumcoo townland, grid ref: H7990 6262
- Dungororan, ráth (area surrounding the state care monument), grid ref: H7387 6931
- Dunmisk, enclosure: "Dunmisk Fort", grid ref: H6279 7074
- Dunmore, mound: moat (Lough Fea), grid ref: H7603 8659
- Dunnalong, fortified town: Dunnalong Fort, grid ref: Area of C378 105
- Dunnamore wedge tomb (de:Wedge Tomb von Dunnamore): "Dermot and Grania's Bed", Dunnamore townland, grid ref: H6860 8090
- Dun Ruadh (Doonroe), multiple cist cairn and henge, Crouck townland, grid ref: H6232 8453
- Durless White, ráth, grid ref: H6040 5145

== E ==
- Edenageeragh, Rath: Lismalore Fort, grid ref: H6966 5249
- Errigal, Rath, grid ref: H5823 5645
- Evish, Wedge tomb, grid ref: H3923 9678

== F ==
- Farsnagh and Sessia, Ruined structure, grid ref: H9673 7573
- Favor Royal Demesne, Bivallate raths (2), grid refs: H6060 5290 and H6128 5215
- Feegarran, Wedge tomb, grid ref: H7726 8225
- Feegarran, Trackway, grid ref: H7664 8265
- Findermore, Cross-carved standing stone: Abbey Stone, grid ref: H5176 5124
- Fintona, Church ruins, in Castletown townland, grid ref: H4447 6143
- Freughlough, Standing stone, grid ref: H2620 8530
- Freughmore, Large hilltop enclosure, grid ref: H4655 6750

== G ==
- Garvagh, Cashel, grid ref: H2031 8460
- Garvagh, Court tomb: County Carn, grid ref: H2016 8694
- Garvaghullion, Bronze Age wooden trackway, grid ref: H3680 7667
- Glasdrummond, Court tomb, grid ref: H7083 5509
- Glasmullagh, Wedge tomb: Dermot and Grania's Bed, grid ref: H3873 8050
- Glasmullagh, Four stone circles and a stone alignment, grid ref: H3868 8041
- Glenchuil, Passage tomb (sometimes known as Glenchuil Fort), grid ref: H6030 5828
- Glencull, Cross-head, grid ref: H6830 5321
- Glengeen, Multiple cist cairn, grid ref: H3712 5687
- Glengeen, Stone circle, grid ref: H3804 5608
- Glenkeen, platform rath, grid ref: H7049 4961
- Glenknock, Portal tomb: ‘Cloghogle’ (area around the state care monument), grid ref: H4117 8794
- Glenlark, Rath, grid ref: H5718 8743
- Glenmacoffer, Standing stones (2), grid ref: H5299 8629
- Glennan, rath, grid ref: H3977 6614
- Glennoo, Church, graveyard and bullaun: Killycawna, grid ref: H4960 4288
- Glenroan, Portal tomb and wedge tomb: Dermot and Grania's Bed, grid ref: H5485 9145
- Golan, Stone circle and stone alignment, grid ref: H4399 8193
- Golan, Henge, grid ref: H6616 5677
- Gortalowry, Rath, grid ref: H8086 7738
- Gortatray, Trivallate enclosure, grid ref: H8595 7051
- Gortmerron, Fragment of Romanesque arch, grid ref: H7738 5356
- Gortnagarn, Court tomb, grid ref: H6686 7122
- Granagh, Court tomb, grid ref: H6087 7639
- Grange, Standing stone (area surrounding the state care monument), grid ref: H8317 7477
- Grange, Standing stones (2) (area surrounding the state care monument), grid ref: H8306 7514

== H ==
- Holywell Church, Church, graveyard and carved stone, in Lackagh* townland, grid ref: H3132 7425

== I ==
- Island McHugh, Crannog and fortification, Baronscourt townland, grid ref: H3646 8378

== K ==
- Keady, Platform rath, grid ref: H5905 5641
- Keerin, Portal tomb, grid ref: H6418 8656
- Keerin, Court tomb, grid ref: H6376 8607
- Kilcroagh, Standing stone: the White Stone, grid ref: H2554 8487
- Kilknock, Wedge tomb, grid ref: H3725 5420
- Kilknock, Large hilltop enclosure, ‘Crockroe’, grid ref: H3697 5498
- Killadroy, Rath, grid ref: H5219 6194
- Killeter, Court tomb, grid ref: H1939 7872
- Killeter, Double stone alignment, grid ref: H1939 7872
- Killoan, Decorated cross-base: the Headstone, grid ref: H2967 7530
- Killucan, Wedge tomb: Carnanbane (area surrounding the state care monument), grid ref: H6833 7925
- Killucan, Long cairn (area surrounding the state care monument), grid ref: H6848 8012
- Killyliss, Bivallate rath, grid ref: H4104 6084
- Killyliss, Rath: Killyliss fort (area surrounding the state care monument), grid ref: H7569 6056
- Killymoon Demesne, Court tomb, grid ref: H8232 7686
- Killymore, Rath: Attyhole Fort, grid ref: H4333 8658
- Killynaght, Portal tomb, grid ref: C3909 0113
- Kilnagrew, Crannog, grid ref: H8082 5397
- Knockaginny, Rath, grid ref: H7265 4625
- Knocknahorna, Stone circle, grid ref: H4105 9890

== L ==
- Laghtmorris, Possible cashel, grid ref: H1860 8435
- Legland, Court tomb, grid ref: H3613 7963
- Leitrim, Portal tomb: Druid's Altar, grid ref: H2250 8000
- Leitrim, Hillfort, grid ref: H2205 8020
- Letterbrat, Portal tomb, grid ref: H4715 9156
- Lettergash, Rath: Lettergash Fort, grid ref: H3028 6203
- Lettery, Stone alignment, megalithic tomb and associated features, grid ref: H2860 6613
- Lisconrea, Two megalithic structures, grid ref: H3930 5670
- Lisconrea, Ring barrow, grid ref: H3946 5674
- Lisdoart, Platform rath, grid ref: H6235 5565
- Lisgobban, Bivallate rath: Lisgobban Fort, grid ref: H8108 5485
- Liskincon, Rath, grid ref: H5629 6763
- Lisky, Court tomb (area surrounding the state care monument), grid ref: H3575 9051
- Lislane, Wedge tombs (2), grid refs: H4747 5363 and H4689 5596
- Lismore, Rath, grid ref: H6196 5447
- Lismore, Favor Royal Bawn, grid ref: H6316 5380
- Lisnagleer, Standing stone: ‘Clogh Corr’, grid ref: H7850 6763
- Lisnaragh Irish, Rath, grid ref: C4569 0025
- Lissan, Rath: Birch Hill, grid ref: H7939 8203
- Lissan, Counterscarp rath, grid ref: H7899 8254
- Loughash, Wedge tomb: Cashelbane, grid ref: C5162 0130
- Loughash, Wedge tomb: Giant's Grave, grid ref: C4834 0080
- Loughmacrory, Court tomb: Carnanbane, grid ref: H5778 7773
- Loughmacrory, Wedge tomb: Dermot and Grania's bed, grid ref: H5862 7765
- Loughmacrory, Court tomb, grid ref: H5854 7701
- Loughry, Rath, grid ref: H8132 7410
- Loughry, Wedge tomb: Giant's Grave, grid ref: H8124 7487
- Loughry, Bronze Age settlement and ring ditch, grid ref: H8139 7498
- Lungs, Earthwork: oval platform and terrace, grid ref: H5050 5106
- Lurganboy, Wedge tomb, grid ref: H4157 8267

== M ==
- Magheraglass, Church and enclosure (area surrounding the state care monument), grid ref: H7437 7677
- Magherakeel, Church, grid ref: H1841 7971
- Mallabeny, Hillfort, grid ref: H5079 5411
- Martray, Rath: Martray Fort, grid ref: H6457 5893
- Meenagorp, Megalithic tomb, grid ref: H4520 9160
- Meendamph, Standing stone and stone circle, grid ref: H4579 9755
- Mountcastle, Plantation castle, grid ref: C4175 0515
- Moymore, Rath, grid ref: H7169 7394
- Moymore, Stone circles (9) and alignments, grid ref: H7104 7452
- Moymore, Barrow, grid ref: H7035 7508
- Mullaghmore, Rath: H7830 6493
- Mullaghslin Glebe, Bivallate rath, grid ref: H5628 7261
- Mullanabreen, Cashel, grid ref: H2005 8242
- Mullanabreen, Rath, grid ref: H2021 8183
- Mullanahoe, Souterrain, grid ref: H9335 7483
- Mullanmore, Wedge tomb: Labby Dermot, grid ref: H5913 7617
- Mullans, Rath, grid ref: H5675 5278
- Mullaghwotragh, Windmill, grid ref: H9203 7715
- Mulnafye, Round cairn, grid ref: H5423 7761
- Mulnagore, Hut platform, grid ref: H7668 6894
- Muntober, Rath: the Black Fort, grid ref: H7442 8161
- Murnells, Portal tomb and long cairn: Dermot and Grania's Bed and round cairn, grid ref: H6796 7569

== N ==
- Newtownstewart, Castle site (mound and foundation): Pigeon Hill, Croshballinfree townland, grid ref: H4036 8578

== O ==
- Oughtboy, Stone alignments, grid ref: H5959 9377
- Oughtdoorish, Rath, grid ref: H5875 9253

== R ==
- Radergan, Megalithic tomb: Grania's Grave, grid ref: H5544 6434
- Reaghan, Two stone circles, standing stone and possible cairn, grid ref: H4409 8185
- Reloagh, Crannogs, grid ref: H7613 6589
- Roughan Castle, Castle, in Roughan townland, grid ref: H8231 6830
- Roughan and Tullagh Beg, Crannog, grid ref: H8277 6868

== S ==
- Scraghy, Stone circle or cairn kerb: Druid's Circle, grid ref: H2088 7423
- Scraghy, Standing stones (2), grid ref: H2213 7383
- Scraghy, Portal tomb, grid ref: H2216 7387
- Seskinore, Platform rath, grid ref: H4913 6360
- Seskinore, Rath, grid ref: H4876 6335
- Sessagh of Gallan, Killeen, grid ref: H4079 8965
- Sessia, Rath, grid ref: H5657 5296
- Sessiamagaroll, Rath and motte: Sessiamagaroll Fort, grid ref: H8120 5404
- Sess Kilgreen, Passage tomb: standing stones (2), grid ref: H6051 5868
- Sess Kilgreen, Mound, grid ref: H6028 5883
- Sess Kilgreen, Passage tomb: decorated standing stone, grid ref: H6026 5860
- Sess Kilgreen, Passage tomb, grid ref: H6041 5845
- Sess Kilgreen, Megalithic tomb, grid ref: H6035 5854
- Shanmaghry, Wedge tomb, grid ref: H7065 6850
- Shantavny Irish, Passage tomb, grid ref: H6018 5969
- Stantavny Scotch, Wedge tomb, grid ref: H5814 6059
- Sixmilecross, Platform rath, grid ref: H5630 6762
- Slaghtfreeden, Megalithic tomb: Giant's Grave and ‘cairns’, grid ref: H7410 8728
- Stakernagh, Crannog in Lough Aughlish, grid ref: H7435 6238
- Stewart Castle, in Newtownstewart, Castle and bawn, grid ref: H4023 8582
- Stewartstown, Castle and village, Castle Farm townland, grid ref: H8599 7077
- Strabane Canal, Strabane Canal Reach 1, Ballydonaghy and Leckpatrick townlands, grid ref: C3594 0391 – C3606 0262
- Strabane Canal, Strabane Canal Reach 2, Greenlaw, Strabane Bog, Woodend and Desert townlands, grid ref: C3605 0262 – C3489 9957
- Strabane Canal, Strabane Canal Reach 3, Greenbrae and Town Parks townlands, grid ref: C3445 9832 – C3462 9895
- Stranagummer, large hilltop enclosure, grid ref: H3049 5632
- Streefe Glebe, Court tomb: Oweyanivore, grid ref: H5440 7535

== T ==
- Tattycor, Rath, grid ref: H3976 6232
- Tattykeel, Standing stone (area surrounding state care monument), grid ref: H7480 7738
- Tattykeel, Megalithic tomb, grid ref: H7455 7752
- Tievenny, Platform rath: Tievenny Fort, grid ref: H3178 8558
- Tievenny, Platform rath, grid ref: H3206 8626
- Tirkernaghan, 17th century house, grid ref: C4454 0032
- Tonnagh More, Rath, grid ref: H4020 5967
- Tremoge, Stone circles (2) and double alignment, grid ref: H6538 7330
- Tremoge, Stone circles (3) and alignment, grid ref: H6574 7368
- Trillick Castle, in Castlemervyn Demesne townland, grid ref: H3354 5758
- Tullycunny, Rath, grid ref: H4330 6731
- Tullydowey, Artillery fort: Mullan Fort, grid ref: H8395 5174
- Tullygiven, Crannog, grid ref: H7761 5263
- Tullyhogue Fort, Inauguration site, Ballymully Glebe townland, grid ref: H8251 7428
- Tycanny, Large hilltop enclosure, grid ref: H5621 5804

== U ==
- Urney Glebe, Ecclesiastical site and cross carved slab: Ernaidhe, grid ref: H3034 9491

== W ==
- Windyhill, Wedge tomb, grid ref: C4016 0229
