= Strabane (barony) =

Coordinates: 54.8°N 7.4°W

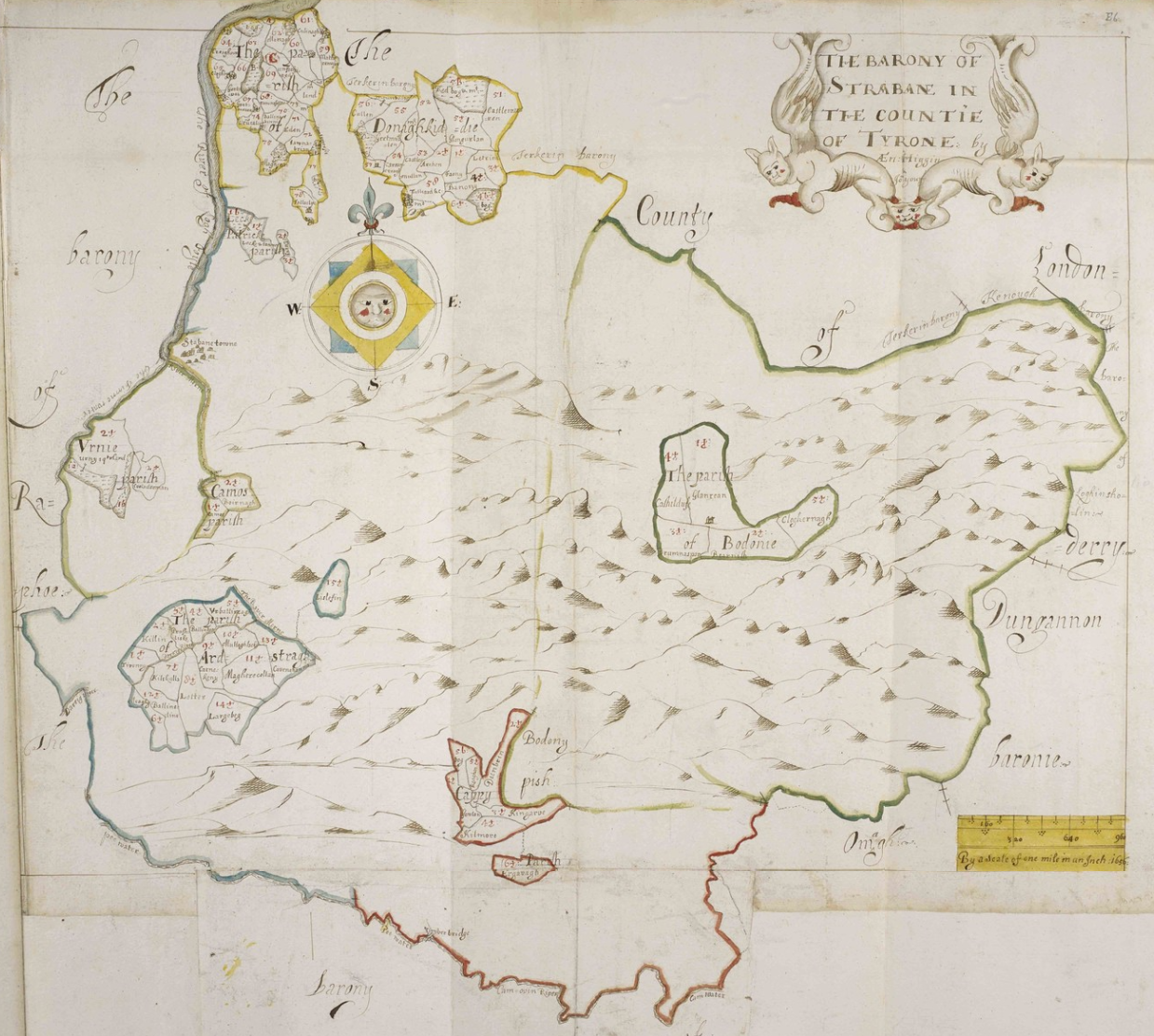
Down Survey map (1650s) of the "Barony of Strabane in the Countie of Tyrone"

The barony of Strabane is a former barony of Ireland, situated in County Tyrone. It was in use as an administrative division from at least the late 16th century. The barony takes its name from the settlement of Strabane which, in 1591, was "made the head of the barony of Strabane" having previously being "in the district of Munterlony". The 1841 census contained a record for "Strabane barony". The barony was subsequently subdivided and, by 1851, had been split into Strabane Lower and Strabane Upper.

== See also ==
- Dungannon (barony) (split, by 1851, into Dungannon Lower, Middle, Upper)
