= Liskincon =

Townland in County Tyrone, Northern Ireland

Liskincon is a small townland in County Tyrone, Northern Ireland. It is situated in the barony of Omagh East and the civil parish of Termonmaguirk and covers an area of approximately 96 acres.

The townland's name derives from the Irish: Lios Cinn Con (fort of the dog's head).

In 1841, the population of the townland was 70 people (12 houses) and in 1851 it was 52 people (11 houses).

The townland contains one Scheduled Historic Monument: a Rath (grid ref: H5629 6763).

== See also ==
- List of townlands of County Tyrone
- List of archaeological sites in County Tyrone
- Sixmilecross
