= Drumsonnus =

Townland in County Tyrone, Northern Ireland

Drumsonnus (Irish: Druim sonais (Ridge of prosperity) is a townland in County Tyrone, Northern Ireland. It is situated in the historic barony of Omagh East and the civil parish of Kilskeery and covers an area of 391 acres.

The population of the townland declined during the 19th century:

Year	1841	1851	1861	1871	1881	1891
Population	224	178	136	105	99	108
Houses	41	33	26	23	19	17

The townland contains one Scheduled Historic Monument: a henge (grid ref: H2805 5380).

== See also ==
- List of townlands of County Tyrone
- List of archaeological sites in County Tyrone
