= Altanagh =

Townland in County Tyrone, Northern Ireland

- Townland
- Location in Northern Ireland
- Coordinates: 54°33′31″N 7°01′01″W
- Country: United Kingdom
- Province: Northern Ireland
- County: County Tyrone

Altanagh is a townland in County Tyrone, Northern Ireland. It is situated in the historic barony of Omagh East and the civil parish of Termonmaguirk and covers an area of 971 acres.

The name derives from the Irish: altan ach (Abounding in cliffs or glens).

The population of the townland declined during the 19th century:

Year	1841	1851	1861	1871	1881	1891
Population	223	202	218	196	154	138
Houses	39	39	40	39	32	33

The townland contains one Scheduled Historic Monument: a burial mound (grid ref: H6266 6936), which contained pits and urn burials with cremated bone. Three cordoned urns were found with a calibrated date range of 1890-1450 BC.

== See also ==
- List of townlands of County Tyrone
- List of archaeological sites in County Tyrone
