= Rakeeranbeg =

Townland (administrative division), County Tyrone, Northern Ireland

- Townland
- Country: Northern Ireland
- Sovereign state: United Kingdom
- Police: Northern Ireland
- Fire: Northern Ireland
- Ambulance: Northern Ireland

Rakeeranbeg (/rəˌkɪərənˈbɛɡ/, locally /ɹəˌciəɹənˈbeːɟ/), or Rathkeeranbeg (/ræθˌkɪərənˈbɛɡ/, locally /ɹaθˌciəɹənˈbeːɟ/; Irish: Ráth Caorthainn Beag, meaning 'little fort of the rowan') is a townland in the Dromore area in County Tyrone in Northern Ireland. It is situated in the barony of Omagh East and the civil parish of Dromore and covers an area of 180 acres.

== Geography ==
Rakeeranbeg lies midway between the villages of Dromore and Fintona in western County Tyrone (Irish Grid Reference H3860). It is bordered by the townlands Cornamucklagh, Tullyclunagh and Lissaneden. It is bounded on the west side by a tributary of the Owenreagh River known as the Shannaragh or Aghlisk River, on the north side by a small burn, and on the southeast side by bog. The northern and western edges of the townland, adjacent to the river and burn, consist of flat 'holmes' which are prone to flooding, whilst the centre of the townland is dominated by a low drumlin (at just over 100m above sea-level). Other than the bog, the land, which is divided by hedgerows of hawthorn and ash into small fields, is used for cattle grazing, although historically potatoes, oats, flax and turnips were grown. The bog was traditionally used as a source of turf for fuel, and consists of a mix of raised bog, marsh and birch and willow carr.

Two minor roads run through the townland, Rakeeran Road and Corbally Road (locally known as 'the Bog Road'). It also has an abandoned railway and farmsteads and houses.

== History ==
The fort which gave Rakeeranbeg its name is no longer apparent (nor are there any rowan trees), but it is clearly marked on maps from 1830 and 1850. Research suggests that ringforts in Ulster were typically constructed between 600AD and 900AD, giving an indication of the length of settlement in Rakeeranbeg.

The name of the townland was first recorded in 1609, as Rathkerhinn, and subsequently the name was recorded in 1610 (?Rathkirhin), 1613 (?Rathkirhin), 1655 (Rakeran beg), 1661 (Rakerranbegg), 1666 (Rikirran), 1730 (Rakerinbegg), and 1784 (Rakeeranbeg).

Additional data is available from the 1830 and 1850 maps covering the area, and railway service was provided during the 19th century.

In 1841 the population of the townland was 57 people (9 houses) and in 1851 it was 53 people (9 houses).

In the Census of Ireland, 1901, the population of Rakeeranbeg (spelt Rathkeeranbeg) was 21, of which 10 were male and 11 were female. Five houses were occupied, with 7, 4, 4, 3 and 3 residents. In terms of religious denomination, 13 were Roman Catholic, 4 were Church of Ireland, 2 were Methodist and 1 was Presbyterian. The four oldest Roman Catholic residents (aged between 40 and 84) indicated that they spoke both English and Irish, but whether this represents survival of native Irish in the area is unknown. In addition, there was a creamery (see Further Notes below).

The Census of Ireland, 1911 reveals that the population of Rakeeranbeg had fallen to 14 since the last census, of which 7 were male and 7 were female. Four houses were occupied, one dwelling house was unoccupied, and the creamery is named as 'Rathkeeranbeg Auxiliary Creamery'. Nine of the residents were recorded as Roman Catholic whilst the remaining five are listed as 'Other Persuasion' (two of these were listed as Church of Ireland in 1901). These individuals of 'Other Persuasion' are remembered by current residents as being 'Dippers' who engaged in baptisms in the local river. Although two of the Roman Catholics who indicated that they spoke Irish in the 1901 census appear again in 1911, no proficiency in Irish is noted for them or any of the other residents of the townland.

The road to the area was eventually tarred, and later railway service ended. The population of Rakeeranbeg as of 10 June 2010 was 5 persons.

== Flora and fauna ==
=== Birds ===
In the Bird Atlas 2007-11 survey, the following species were recorded in Rakeeranbeg:

- Winter: Whooper swan (fly-over), mallard, cormorant, grey heron, hen harrier, sparrowhawk, buzzard, peregrine falcon, lapwing, snipe, woodcock, feral pigeon, woodpigeon, kingfisher, meadow pipit, grey wagtail, pied wagtail, dipper, wren, dunnock, robin, stonechat, blackbird, fieldfare, song thrush, redwing, mistle thrush, goldcrest, long-tailed tit, coal tit, blue tit, great tit, treecreeper, magpie, jackdaw, rook, hooded crow, raven, starling, common chaffinch, goldfinch, siskin, lesser redpoll, bullfinch, reed bunting
- Summer: Grey heron, sparrowhawk, buzzard, lesser black-backed gull, feral pigeon, woodpigeon, cuckoo, swift, sand martin, swallow, house martin, meadow pipit, grey wagtail, pied wagtail, dipper, wren, robin, stonechat, blackbird, song thrush, mistle thrush, grasshopper warbler, sedge warbler, blackcap, willow warbler, goldcrest, spotted flycatcher, long-tailed tit, coal tit, blue tit, great tit, treecreeper, jay, magpie, jackdaw, rook, hooded crow, starling, house sparrow, chaffinch, greenfinch, goldfinch, lesser redpoll, bullfinch, reed bunting

A number of species historically bred in the area, but are now extinct (or only occur occasionally), including corn crake, barn owl and grey partridge.

== Further notes ==
- The British Food Journal (1933) reported a case involving the selling of butter with an illegal excess of water in Derry. This butter was reported as originating in "the Dromore and Rakeeranbeg Creamery". The defendants were found guilty and fined, and it was recommended that they seek recompense from those who supplied the butter.
- On 7 June 2010, the Shannaragh (Aghlisk) River was subject to a significant pollution event which killed thousands of fish. The area affected included the stretch running past Rakeeranbeg.

== See also ==
- List of townlands of County Tyrone
