= Muntober =

Townland in County Tyrone, Northern Ireland

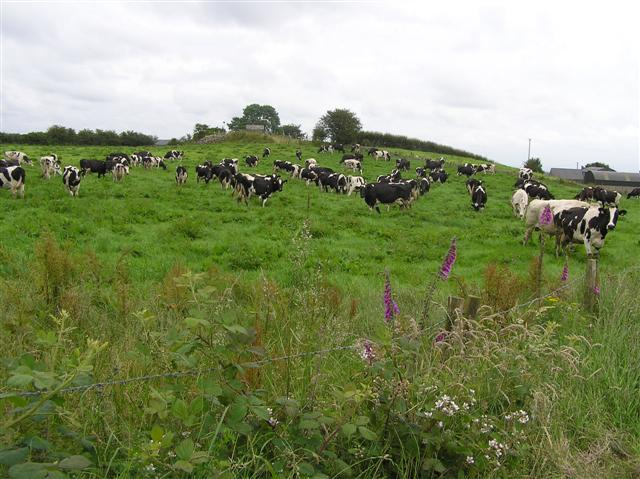
Muntober townland in 2007

Muntober is a townland in County Tyrone, Northern Ireland. It is situated in the barony of Dungannon Upper and the civil parish of Kildress and covers an area of 613 acres.

In 1841 the population of the townland was 226 people (41 houses) and in 1851 it was 187 people (34 houses).

The townland contains one Scheduled Historic Monument: a Rath: the Black Fort (grid ref: H7442 8161).

== See also ==
- List of townlands of County Tyrone
- List of archaeological sites in County Tyrone
