= Carrigans, County Tyrone =

Townland in County Tyrone, Northern Ireland

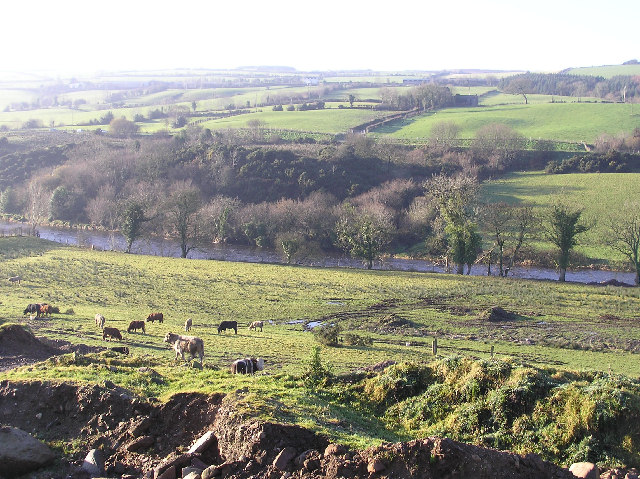
Carrigans townland in 2005

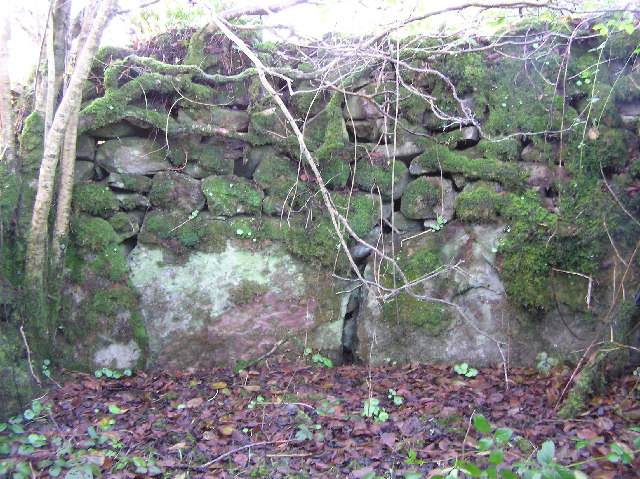
Court tomb in Carrigans townland, 2005

Carrigans is a townland in County Tyrone, Northern Ireland. It is situated in the historic barony of Strabane Upper and the civil parish of Cappagh and covers an area of 859 acres.

The name derives from the Irish: Carraigínidhe (small rocks).

The population of the townland declined during the 19th century:

Year	1841	1851	1861	1871	1881	1891
Population	386	274	259	230	164	125
Houses	80	58	55	40	32	26

The townland contains one Scheduled Historic Monument: a Court tomb (grid ref: H4218 8076).

== See also ==
- List of townlands of County Tyrone
- List of archaeological sites in County Tyrone
