= Radergan =

Townland in County Tyrone, Northern Ireland

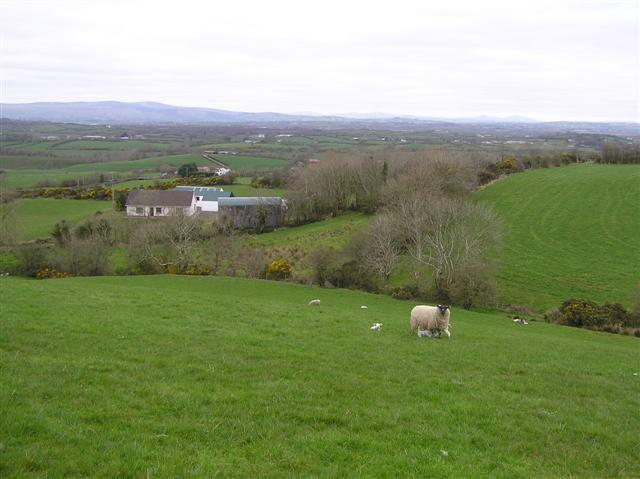
Radergan townland in 2009

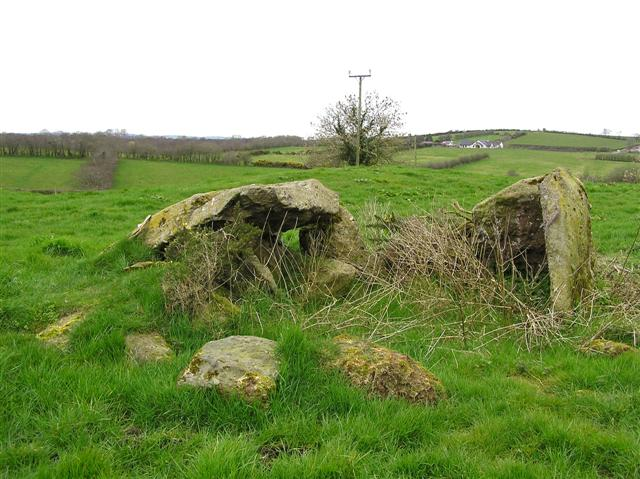
Grania's Grave, Radergan, in 2009

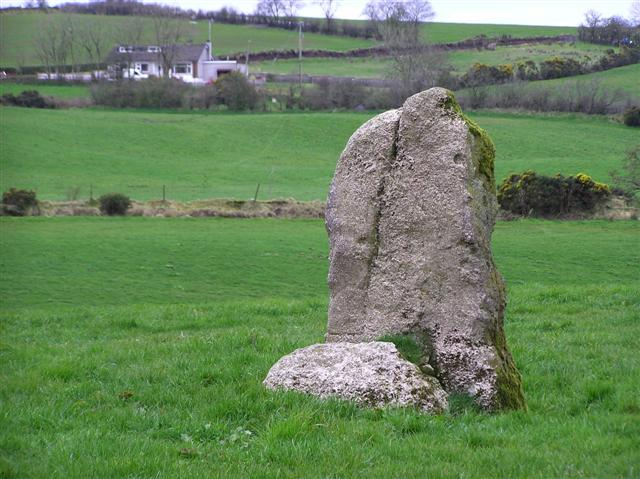
Radergan Standing Stone, 2009

Radergan is a townland in County Tyrone, Northern Ireland. It is situated in the barony of Omagh East and the civil parish of Clogherny and covers an area of 919 acres.

The name derives from the Irish: Rath Deargain (Dargan's fort). It may also be spelled as Redargan or Redargen in various records.

In 1841 the population of the townland was 375 people (69 houses) and in 1851 it was 324 people (57 houses).

The townland contains one Scheduled Historic Monument: a Megalithic tomb: Grania’s Grave (grid ref: H5544 6434). Radergan also has a standing stone (grid ref:H554646), a 1.4m tall mudstone pillar, with embedded pebbles.

== See also ==
- List of townlands of County Tyrone
- List of archaeological sites in County Tyrone
