= Oughtdoorish =

Townland in County Tyrone, Northern Ireland

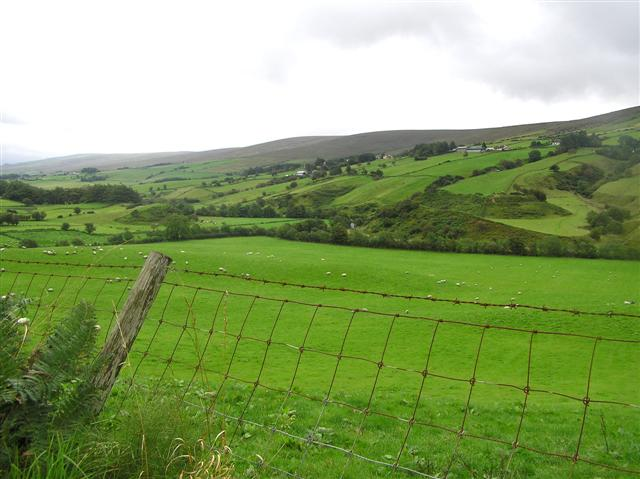
Oughtdoorish townland in 2006

Oughtdoorish is a townland in County Tyrone, Northern Ireland. It is situated in the barony of Strabane Upper and the civil parish of Bodoney Upper and covers an area of 1848 acres.

The name derives from the Irish: Ocht dubhrois (breast of hill of the black wood).

In 1841 the population of the townland was 126 people (28 houses) and in 1851 it was 148 people (27 houses).

The townland contains one Scheduled Historic Monument: a Rath (grid ref: H5875 9253).

== See also ==
- List of townlands of County Tyrone
- List of archaeological sites in County Tyrone
