= Tattycor =

Townland in County Tyrone, Northern Ireland

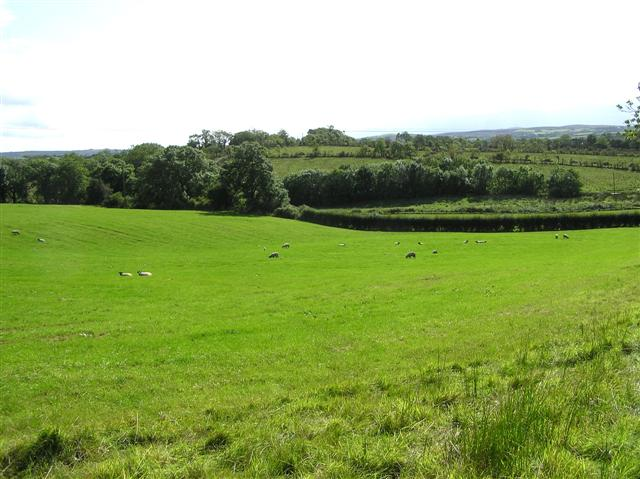
Tattycor townland in 2009

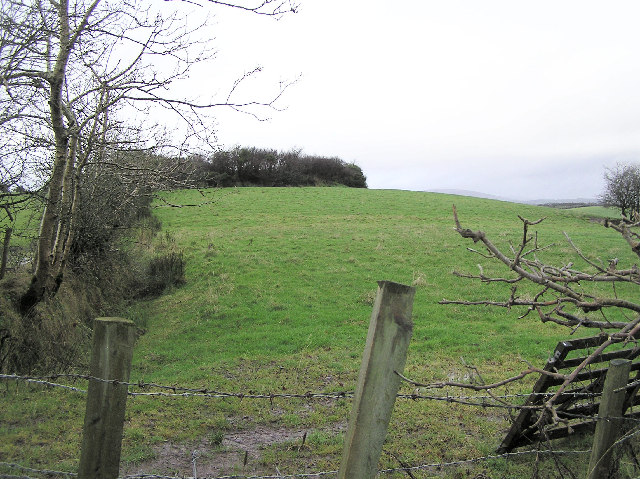
Rath in Tattycor townland, 2005

Tattycor is a townland in County Tyrone, Northern Ireland. It is situated in the barony of Omagh East and the civil parish of Dromore and covers an area of 355 acres.

The name derives from the Irish: An Táite Corr (the odd or prominent tate (a land division)).

In 1841 the population of the townland was 204 people (37 houses) and in 1851 it was 137 people (31 houses).

The townland contains one Scheduled Historic Monument: a Rath (grid ref: H3976 6232).

== See also ==
- List of townlands of County Tyrone
- List of archaeological sites in County Tyrone
