= Oughtboy =

Townland in County Tyrone, Northern Ireland

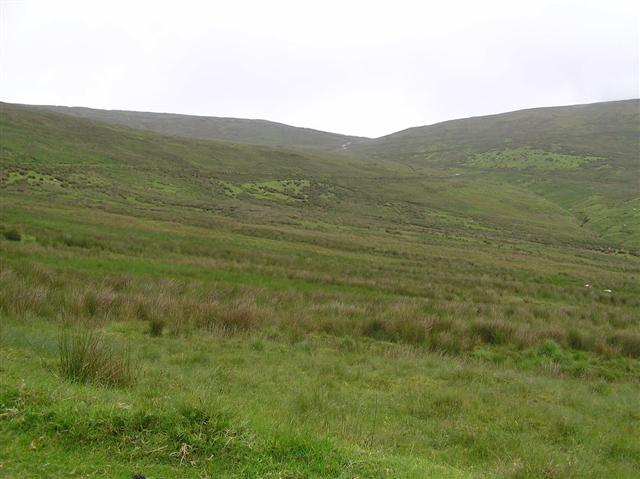
Oughtboy townland in 2007

Oughtboy is a townland in County Tyrone, Northern Ireland. It is situated in the barony of Strabane Upper and the civil parish of Bodoney Upper and covers an area of 964 acres.

The name derives from the Irish: ucht buidhe (Yellow breast of a hill).

In 1841 the population of the townland was 57 people (14 houses) and in 1851 it was 62 people (12 houses).

The townland contains one Scheduled Historic Monument: Stone alignments (grid ref: H5959 9377).

== See also ==
- List of townlands of County Tyrone
- List of archaeological sites in County Tyrone
