= Tullymagough =

Townland in County Tyrone, Northern Ireland

Coordinates: 54.4883°N 7.5194°W

Tullymagough is a townland in County Tyrone, Northern Ireland. It is situated in the barony of Omagh East and the civil parish of Dromore and covers an area of 113 acres (0.46 km^{2}).

The name derives from the Irish: Tulaigh Mhig Eochadha (Mac Geough's hillock).

In 1841 the population of the townland was 37 people (18 houses) and in 1851 it was 49 people (10 houses).

== See also ==
- List of townlands of County Tyrone
