= Ballymully Glebe =

Townland in County Tyrone, Northern Ireland

Ballymully Glebe is a townland in County Tyrone, Northern Ireland. It is situated in the historic barony of Dungannon Upper and the civil parish of Desertcreat and covers an area of 144 acres.

The name derives from the Irish: Baile Mullaigh (town of the summit or farmstead of the summit).

The population of the townland declined during the 19th century:

Year	1841	1851	1861	1871	1881	1891
Population	64	30	36	15	13	7
Houses	12	5	4	4	3	3

The townland contains one Scheduled Historic Monument: Tullyhogue Fort (grid ref: H8251 7428).

== See also ==
- List of townlands of County Tyrone
- List of archaeological sites in County Tyrone
