= Cloncandra Glebe =

Townland in County Tyrone, Northern Ireland

Cloncandra Glebe is a townland in County Tyrone, Northern Ireland. It is situated in the historic barony of Omagh East and the civil parish of Kilskeery and covers an area of 213 acres.

The name derives from the Irish: Cluain Conraidh (Conradh's lawn or meadow).

The population of the townland declined during the 19th century:

Year	1841	1851	1861	1871	1881	1891
Population	97	80	63	37	29	30
Houses	19	17	14	9	7	7

== See also ==
- List of townlands of County Tyrone
