= Crannogue =

Townland in County Tyrone, Northern Ireland

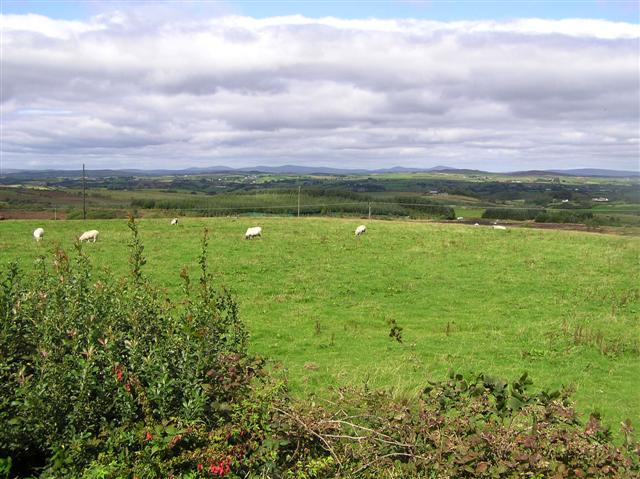
Crannogue townland in 2006

Crannogue is a townland in County Tyrone, Northern Ireland. It is situated in the historic barony of Dungannon Middle and the civil parish of Pomeroy and covers an area of 759 acres.

The population of the townland increased slightly during the 19th century:

Year	1841	1851	1861	1871	1881	1891
Population	81	85	88	102	102	88
Houses	15	16	18	23	24	21

The townland contains one Scheduled Historic Monument: a Fortified mound (grid ref: H6839 6762).

== See also ==
- List of townlands of County Tyrone
- List of archaeological sites in County Tyrone
