= Ballygittle =

Townland in County Tyrone, Northern Ireland

Coordinates: 54°34′1″N 6°38′16″W

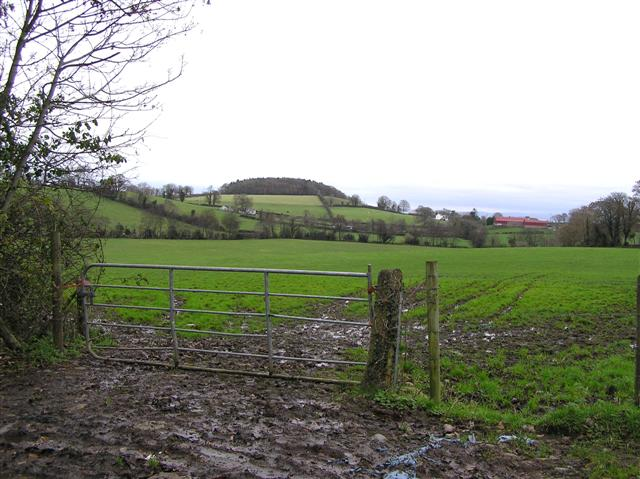
Ballygittle townland in 2006

Ballygittle is a townland in County Tyrone, Northern Ireland. It is situated in the historic barony of Dungannon Middle and the civil parish of Clonoe and covers an area of 169 acres. It is close to Stewartstown.

The name derives from the Irish: Baile a n-Giatail (town of the grain).

The population of the townland declined during the 19th century:

Year	1841	1851	1861	1871	1881	1891
Population	126	98	86	63	35	45
Houses	26	18	16	12	11	10

== See also ==
- List of townlands of County Tyrone
