= Glenmacoffer =

Townland in County Tyrone, Northern Ireland

Coordinates: 54.6998°N 7.1906°W

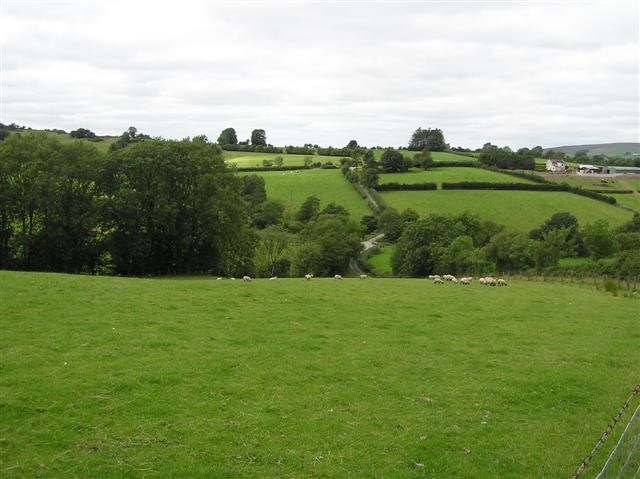
Glenmacoffer townland in 2006

Glenmacoffer is a townland in County Tyrone, Northern Ireland. It is situated in the barony of Strabane Upper and the civil parish of Bodoney Lower and covers an area of 2703 acres.

The name derives from the Irish: Gleann Mhic Cathbhairr (M'Caffer's glen, after a man found dead there).

In 1841 the population of the townland was 533 people (104 houses) and in 1851 it was 453 people (92 houses).

The townland contains one Scheduled Historic Monument: two Standing stones (grid ref: H5299 8629) leaning in different directions, each some 1.8m high and 1.5m wide.

== See also ==
- List of townlands of County Tyrone
- List of archaeological sites in County Tyrone
