= Broughderg =

Land area in County Tyrone, Northern Ireland

Coordinates: 54°43′N 7°00′W

Broughderg, County Tyrone: Irish: Bruach Dearg
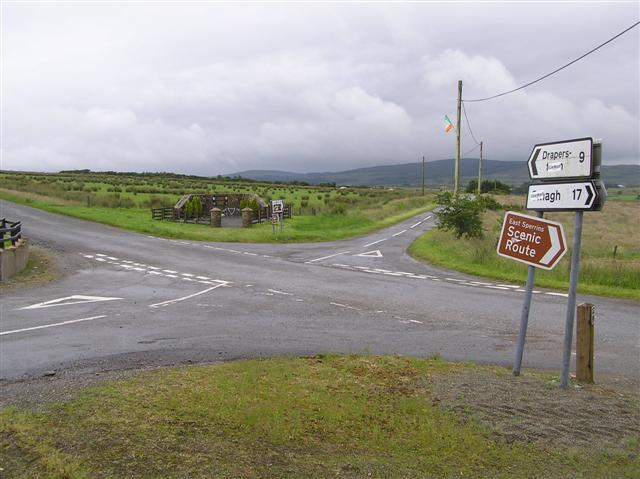
- Crossroads at Broughderg in 2007
- County: County Tyrone
- Country: Northern Ireland
- Sovereign state: United Kingdom
- Postcode district: BT79
- Dialling code: 028

Broughderg (from Irish Bruach Dearg, meaning 'red bank/edge') is a townland of 4,239 acres in County Tyrone, Northern Ireland, 16 km north-west of Cookstown. It is situated in the civil parish of Lissan and the historic barony of Dungannon Upper.

== See also ==
- List of townlands in County Tyrone
