= Letterbrat =

Townland in County Tyrone, Northern Ireland

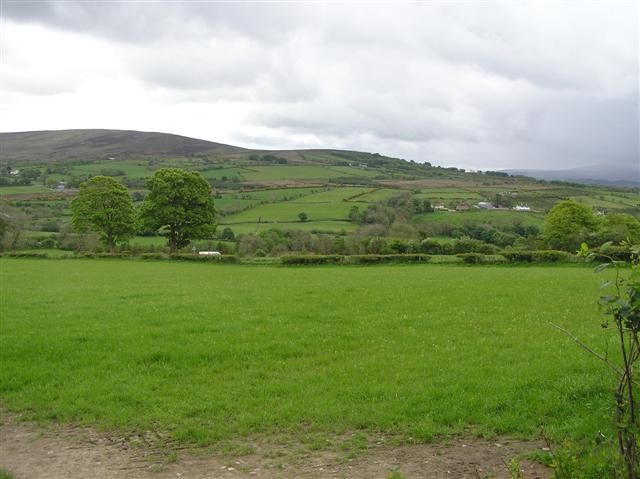
Letterbrat townland in 2009

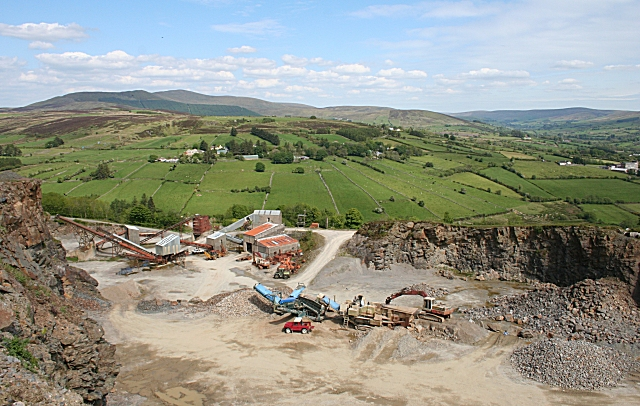
Letterbrat Quarry in 2007

Letterbrat is a townland in County Tyrone, Northern Ireland. It is situated in the barony of Strabane Upper and the civil parish of Bodoney Upper and covers an area of 708 acres.

The name derives from the Irish: Lathair Beith (Place for birch trees), Litir brat (hill of the cloaks) or leiter brat (wet sloping land of the brats/mantle).

In 1841 the population of the townland was 222 people (41 houses) and in 1851 it was 182 people (32 houses).

The townland contains one Scheduled Historic Monument: a Portal tomb (grid ref: H4715 9156).

The townland also contains Letterbrat Quarry (grid ref: H471923) where the very old grey quartz-rich rock is worked for road stone. The quarry also features a very thick intrusion of porphyry.

== See also ==
- List of townlands of County Tyrone
- List of archaeological sites in County Tyrone
