= Listamlet =

Townland in County Tyrone, Northern Ireland

Listamlet is a townland in County Tyrone, Northern Ireland. It is situated in the barony of Dungannon Middle and the civil parish of Clonfeacle and covers an area of 166 acres.

The name derives from the Irish: Lios Tamhlachta (Fort of the Burial Place).

In 1841 the population of the townland was 257 people (48 houses) and in 1851 it was 196 people (37 houses).

== See also ==
- List of townlands of County Tyrone
