= Reaghan, County Tyrone =

Townland in Northern Ireland

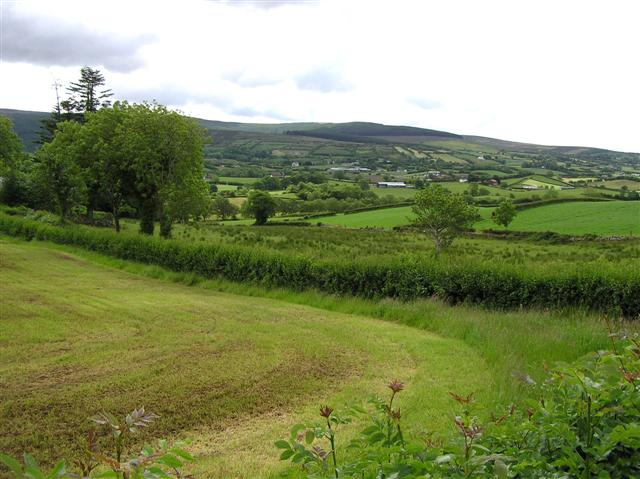
Reaghan townland in 2008

Reaghan is a townland in County Tyrone, Northern Ireland. It is situated in the barony of Strabane Upper and the civil parish of Cappagh and covers an area of 567 acres.

The name derives from the Irish: Reachán (grey land).

In 1841 the population of the townland was 225 people (39 houses) and in 1851 it was 167 people (29 houses).

The townland contains Scheduled Historic Monuments: Two stone circles, a standing stone and a possible cairn (grid ref: H4409 8185).

== See also ==
- List of townlands of County Tyrone
- List of archaeological sites in County Tyrone
