= Gortalowry =

Townland in County Tyrone, Northern Ireland

Coordinates: 54°38′12″N 6°44′35″W

Gortalowry (from Irish: Gort Ui Labhradha) is a townland in County Tyrone, Northern Ireland. It is situated in the barony of Dungannon Upper and the civil parish of Derryloran and covers an area of 281 acres. The townland is partly rural, but includes the southern part of the town of Cookstown.

The name derives from the Irish: Gort an Leamhraigh (field of the place of elms).

St Luaran's Roman Catholic Church, built about 1824 and renovated in 2003, is in the townland. Gortalowry Primary School opened in 1833, but closed in 1967.

In 1841 the population of the townland was 83 people (15 houses) and in 1851 it was 165 people (34 houses).

The townland contains one Scheduled Historic Monument: a Rath (grid ref: H8086 7738)

== See also ==
- List of townlands of County Tyrone
- List of archaeological sites in County Tyrone
