= Tullylig =

Townland in County Tyrone, Northern Ireland

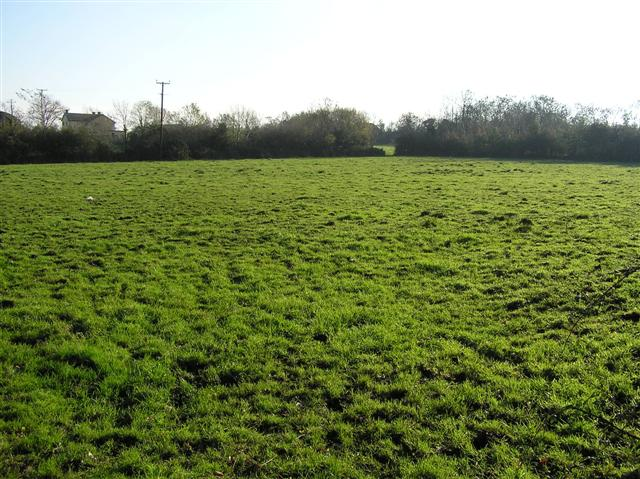
Tullylig townland in 2006

Tullylig is a townland in County Tyrone, Northern Ireland. It is situated in the barony of Dungannon Middle and the civil parish of Donaghenry and covers an area of 131 acres.

The name derives from the Irish Tulaigh Laig ('hillock of the hollow').

In 1841 the population of the townland was 100 people (18 houses) and in 1851 it was 80 people (15 houses).

== See also ==
- List of townlands of County Tyrone
