= Doocrock =

Townland in County Tyrone, Northern Ireland

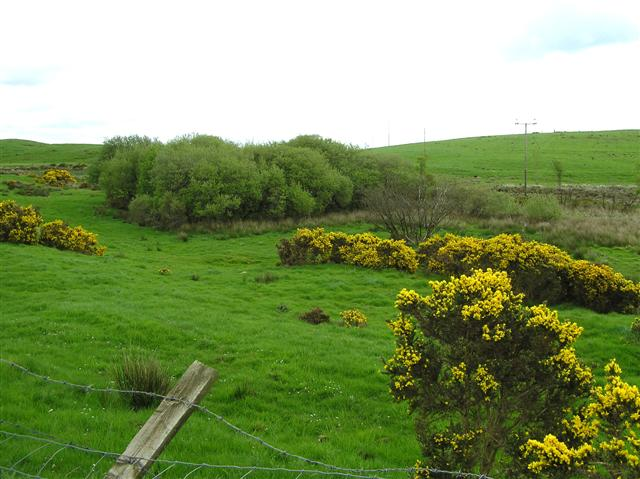
Doocrock townland in 2007

Doocrock is a townland in County Tyrone, Northern Ireland. It is situated in the historic barony of Omagh East and the civil parish of Dromore and covers an area of 426 acres.

The name derives from the Irish: Dubh Chnoc (a Black Hill).

The population of the townland declined during the 19th century:

Year	1841	1851	1861	1871	1881	1891
Population	206	153	146	129	118	105
Houses	34	29	28	25	23	23

The townland contains one Scheduled Historic Monument: a court tomb (grid ref: H2764 6219).

== See also ==
- List of townlands of County Tyrone
- List of archaeological sites in County Tyrone
