= Tullagherin =

Townland in County Tyrone, Northern Ireland

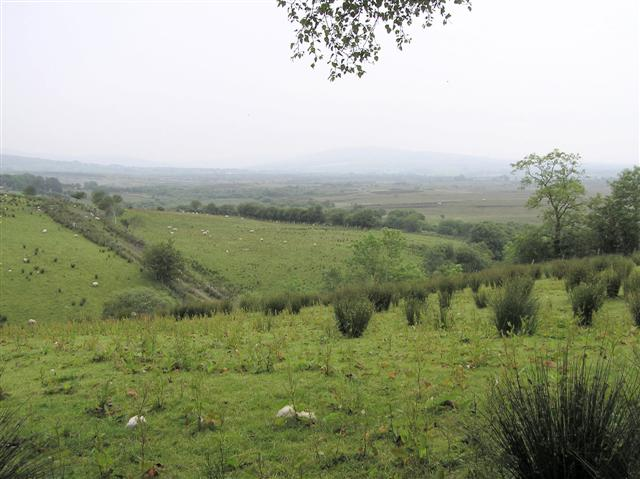
Tullagherin townland in 2006

Tullagherin is a townland in County Tyrone, Northern Ireland. It is situated in the barony of Strabane Upper and the civil parish of Bodoney Upper and covers an area of 937 acres.

The name derives from the Irish: Tulachearn (Barley field) or Tulach Eorna (Barley hill).

In 1841 the population of the townland was 134 people (29 houses) and in 1851 it was 113 people (23 houses).

== See also ==
- List of townlands of County Tyrone
