= Trickvallen =

Townland in County Tyrone, Northern Ireland

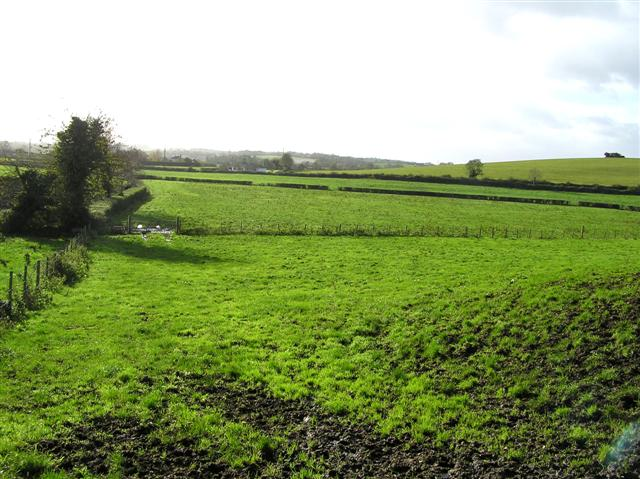
Trickvallen townland in 2006

Trickvallen is a townland in County Tyrone, Northern Ireland. It is situated in the barony of Dungannon Upper and the civil parish of Arboe and covers an area of 279 acres.

The name derives from the Irish: tric bhallen (a small cup or churn-shaped hill).

In 1841 the population of the townland was 238 people (54 houses) and in 1851 it was 208 people (42 houses).

== See also ==
- List of townlands of County Tyrone
