= John Kerdiffe =

Anglican priest in Ireland

John Kerdiff, DD (died 1671) was an Anglican priest in Ireland during the 17th century.

Kerdiffe was educated at Trinity College, Dublin. He held incumbencies at Desertcreat and Navan He was Dean of Clonmacnoise from 1661 to 1668.
