= Loughmacrory =

Village in County Tyrone, Northern Ireland

Coordinates: 54°37′30″N 7°6′28″W

Loughmacrory: Irish: Loch Mhic Ruairí
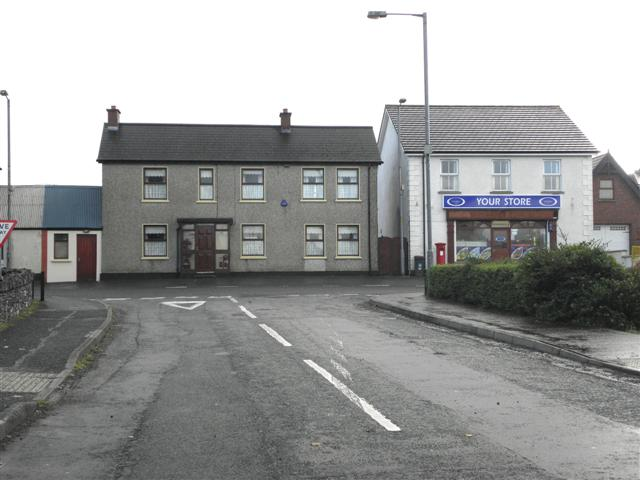
- The village in 2009

- Location within Northern Ireland
- Population: 237
  - Belfast: 47 mi (76 km)
  - Dublin: 95 mi (153 km)
- District: Fermanagh and Omagh
- County: County Tyrone
- Country: Northern Ireland
- Sovereign state: United Kingdom
- Post town: OMAGH
- Postcode district: BT79
- Dialling code: 028
- Police: Northern Ireland
- Fire: Northern Ireland
- Ambulance: Northern Ireland
- UK Parliament: West Tyrone
- NI Assembly: West Tyrone

Loughmacrory (AKA the lough)(/lɒx.məˈkrɔːri/ lokh-mə-KROR-ee; from Irish Loch Mhic Ruairí, meaning 'MacRuairí's lake') is a village and townland (of 1651 acres) in County Tyrone, Northern Ireland. The village is 8 miles (13 km) east of Omagh in the historic barony of Omagh East and the civil parish of Termonmaguirk. it had a population of 237 in the 2001 census. Loughmacrory has houses, shops, a church and a primary school. There is also an old mill and ancient cairns nearby.

Loughmacrory is part of the Fermanagh and Omagh District Council area.

== History ==
On the west side of Loughmacrory lake there is a well-preserved wedge tomb (cairn) with its three roof stones still in place. The entrance to the cairn faces southwest. The area has several standing stones and ruined cairns. Nearby are the stone circles at Copney. To the west is Lough Fingrean with a submerged crannog. An ancient boat was recovered from this lough and is now on display at the nearby An Creagan Visitors Centre.

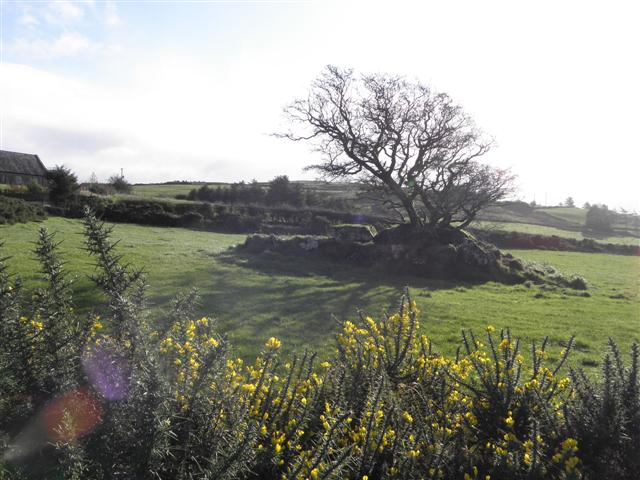
Chambered grave near Copney

== Sport ==
Loughmacrory St. Teresa's is the local Gaelic Athletic Association (GAA) club. Loughmacrory St. Teresa's Cross Country Team Flahavans Finalists. Loughmacrory St.Teresa's, Tyrone Senior Football Champions 2025
