= Freughlough =

Townland in County Tyrone, Northern Ireland

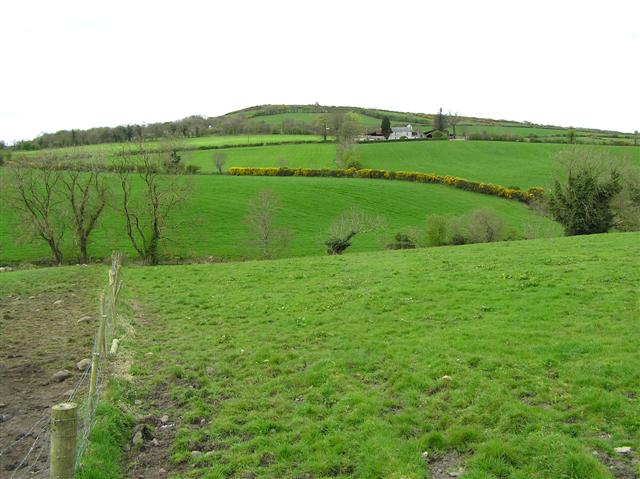
Freughlough townland in 2007

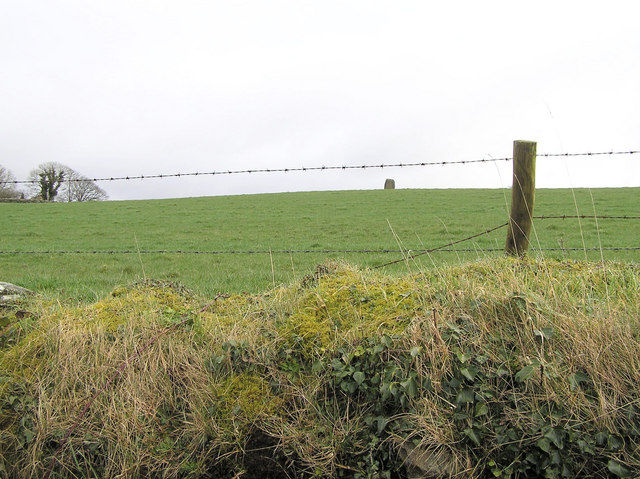
Standing stone in Freughlough townland, 2006

Freughlough is a townland in County Tyrone, Northern Ireland. It is situated in the historic barony of Omagh West and the civil parish of Urney and covers an area of 592 acres.

The population of the townland declined during the 19th century:

Year	1841	1851	1861	1871	1881	1891
Population	231	160	181	144	158	109
Houses	47	27	34	29	30	27

The townland contains one Scheduled Historic Monument: a Standing stone (grid ref: H2620 8530) now situated on the edge of a housing estate. The stone stands to a height of 1.45m and a width of 1.05m.

== See also ==
- List of townlands of County Tyrone
- List of archaeological sites in County Tyrone
