= Lisgobban, County Tyrone =

Townland in County Tyrone, Northern Ireland

Coordinates: 54°25′42″N 6°45′12″W

Lisgobban is a townland in County Tyrone, Northern Ireland. It is situated in the barony of Dungannon Middle and the civil parish of Clonfeacle and covers an area of 135 acres.

The name derives from the Irish: lios gobbain (Little snout like fort) or Lios Gobáin (Gobban's fort/enclosure).

In 1841 the population of the townland was 72 people (12 houses) and in 1851 it was 37 people (8 houses).

The townland contains one Scheduled Historic Monument: a Bivallate rath: Lisgobban Fort (grid ref: H8108 5485).

== See also ==
- List of townlands of County Tyrone
- List of archaeological sites in County Tyrone
