= Garvaghullion =

Townland in County Tyrone, Northern Ireland

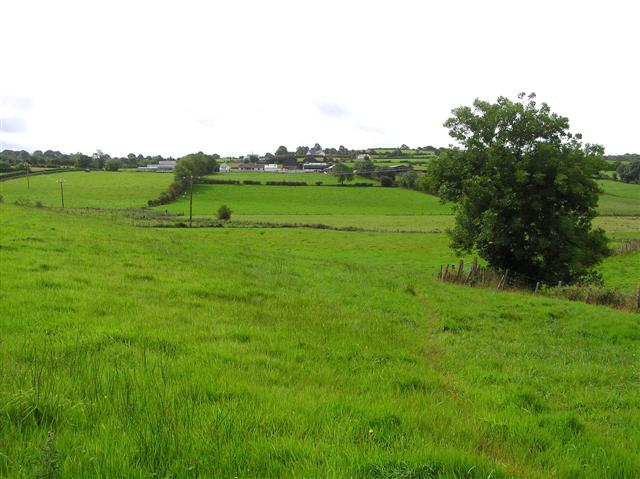
Garvaghullion townland in 2009

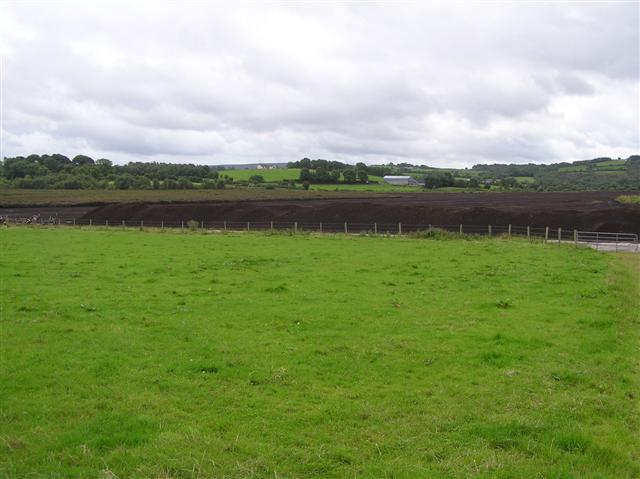
Garvaghullion Bog peat extraction, in 2009

Garvaghullion is a townland in County Tyrone, Northern Ireland. It is situated in the barony of Omagh West and the civil parish of Longfield East and covers an area of 640 acres.

The name derives from the Irish: Garbhach an Chuilinn (rough place of the holly).

In 1841 the population of the townland was 204 people (38 houses) and in 1851 it was 157 people (33 houses).

The townland contains one Scheduled Historic Monument: a Bronze Age wooden trackway (grid ref: H3680 7667). This was found in Garvaghullion Bog (grid ref: H365768), 9km north-west of Omagh, at a depth of over 1.5m in the bog. Garvaghullion Bog is a range of raised bogs found along the valley of the Fairy Water river in which commercial peat extraction had begun in the 1990s. By 1997 only one tenth of the original bog was left, which although scientifically important, hasn't been protected.

== See also ==
- List of townlands of County Tyrone
- List of archaeological sites in County Tyrone
