= Lisgobban =

Lisgobban may refer to the following places:

- Lisgobban, County Roscommon, a townland of County Roscommon, Ireland
- Lisgobban, County Tyrone, a townland of County Tyrone, Northern Ireland
