= Carnteel =

Village in County Tyrone, Northern Ireland

Coordinates: 54°26′N 6°56′W

Carnteel: Irish: Carn tSiadhail
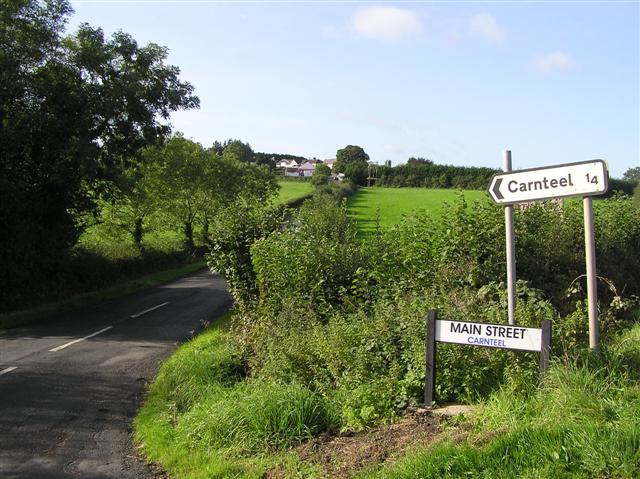
- Carnteel in 2006
- County: County Tyrone
- Country: Northern Ireland
- Sovereign state: United Kingdom
- Post town: AUGHNACLOY
- Postcode district: BT69
- Dialling code: 028

Carnteel (from Irish Carn tSiadhail, meaning 'Sheil's cairn') is a small village, townland and civil parish, about 2 miles (3 km) northeast of Aughnacloy in County Tyrone, Northern Ireland. It is in the historic barony of Dungannon Lower.

== Carnteel village ==
The village is 8 miles (13 km) southwest of Dungannon, close to the B35 Dungannon to Aughnacloy road, with a hilltop location, focused around a crossroads at its centre and with the ruins of an historic church. It is largely made up of housing, with a large agricultural machinery business to the north, and other facilities limited to a shop and post office.

== Carnteel parish ==
In 1837 Carnteel parish, situated on the River Blackwater, had a population of 7,459 people (including those in Aughnacloy) and covered 13,432 acres. It was mountainous, with some bog, in the north of the parish and there was extensive quarrying. Most people were engaged in agriculture with some linen and cotton weaving.

The church at Carnteel was destroyed in the Irish Rebellion of 1641 and replaced with a church at Aghaloo, itself replaced after the building of a church in Aughnacloy in 1736.

The parish contains the townlands of:

- Annagh Beg
- Armalughey
- Aughnacloy
- Ballynapottoge
- Belragh
- Branny
- Carnteel
- Castletown
- Cavan Oneill
- Cavankilgreen
- Commons
- Corderry
- Cranslough
- Cravenny Irish
- Cravenny Scotch
- Dernabane
- Dernaborey
- Derrycreevy
- Derrycush
- Doolargy
- Drone
- Drumaslaghy
- Edentiloan
- Garvey
- Glack
- Glenroe
- Golan
- Inishmagh
- Killyneery
- Knockadreen
- Knocknarney
- Leany
- Legaroe
- Lisadavil
- Lisbeg
- Lisconduff
- Lisdoart
- Lisginny
- Loughans
- Martray
- Mullaghbane
- Mullaghnese
- Plaister
- Ravellea
- Reskatirriff
- Rousky
- Shanalurg
- Shantavny
- Skey
- Tirelugan
- Tully
- Tullyvar
- Tullywinny
- Tulnavern

== Carnteel townland ==
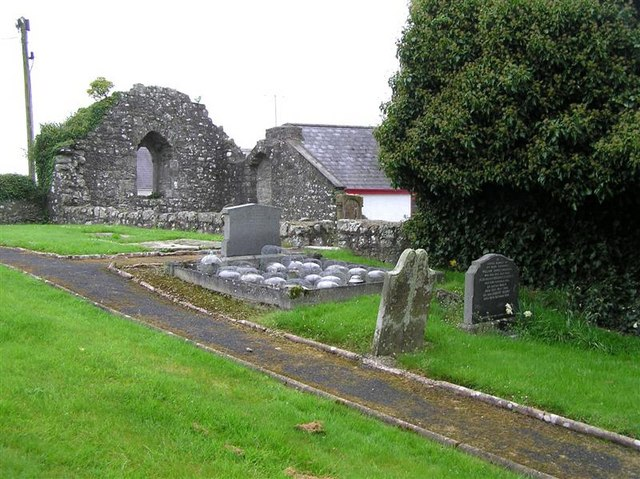
Carnteel church in 2006

The townland is situated in the historic barony of Dungannon Lower and the civil parish of Carnteel and covers an area of 235 acres.

The population of the townland declined during the 19th century:

Year	1841	1851	1861	1871	1881	1891
Population	110	98	88	85	70	55
Houses	21	18	18	16	14	12

The townland contains one Scheduled Historic Monument: a church (grid ref: H6944 5460).

== See also ==
- List of civil parishes of County Tyrone
- List of townlands of County Tyrone
