= Branny =

Townland in County Tyrone, Northern Ireland

Branny: Irish: Brannaidh
- County: County Tyrone
- Country: Northern Ireland
- Sovereign state: United Kingdom
- Postcode district: BT69
- Dialling code: 028

Branny is a townland in County Tyrone, Northern Ireland. It is situated in the historic barony of Dungannon Lower and the civil parish of Carnteel and covers an area of 228 acres (92 ha).

The name derives from the Irish: Brannaidh (pens or folds for sheep).

The population of the townland declined during the 19th century:

Year	1841	1851	1861	1871	1881	1891
Population	24	17	8	14	12	13
Houses	4	4	2	2	2	2

The townland contains one Scheduled Historic Monument: a hilltop enclosure (grid ref: H6826 5556).

== See also ==
- List of townlands of County Tyrone
- List of archaeological sites in County Tyrone
