= Evish =

Townland in County Tyrone, Northern Ireland

Coordinates: 54.811°N 7.403°W

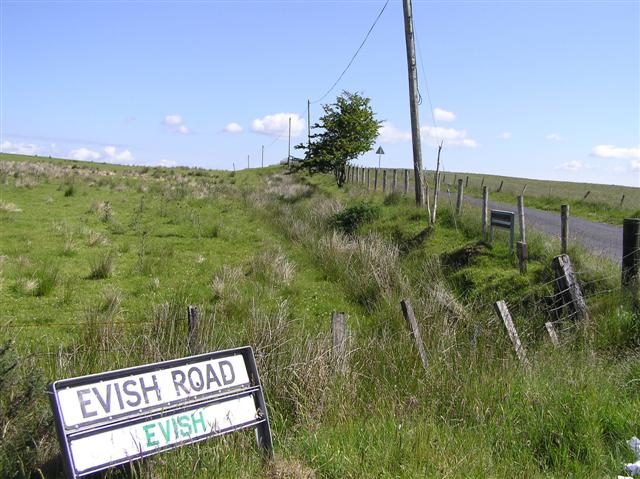
Evish townland in 2006

Evish (Irish: Eimhis, meaning 'coarse mountain pasture') is a small rural community area and townland in County Tyrone, Northern Ireland, 3 miles from Strabane and 7 miles from Plumbridge. It is situated in the barony of Strabane Lower and the civil parish of Camus and covers an area of 870 acres (350 ha).

== Features ==
Within the area is Evish Primary School and Evish Cross Community Group. It includes Dergalt where President Woodrow Wilson's ancestral home is located.

== Demographics ==
In 1841 the population of the townland was 193 people (39 houses) and in 1851 it was 199 people (43 houses).

== Archaeology ==
The townland contains one Scheduled Historic Monument: a Wedge tomb (grid ref: H3923 9678).

== See also ==
- List of townlands of County Tyrone
- List of archaeological sites in County Tyrone
