= Carncorran Glebe =

Townland in County Tyrone, Northern Ireland

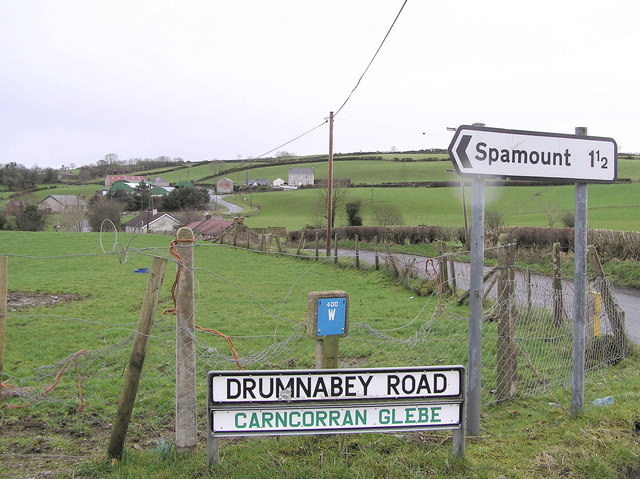
Drumnabey Road, Carncorran Glebe, in 2006

Carncorran Glebe (Irish: Carn Corráin (hook-shaped heap of stones)) is a townland in County Tyrone, Northern Ireland. It is situated in the historic barony of Omagh West and the civil parish of Ardstraw and covers an area of 243 acres.

The population of the townland declined during the 19th century:

Year	1841	1851	1861	1871	1881	1891
Population	110	83	87	81	60	61
Houses	22	19	17	17	16	16

The townland contains one Scheduled Historic Monument: a Portal tomb: Giant's Grave (grid ref: H2889 8243). The portal tomb consists of two large mis-matched portal stones nearly 3m tall and a tiny door-stone.

== See also ==
- List of townlands of County Tyrone
- List of archaeological sites in County Tyrone
