= Aghalunny =

Townland in County Tyrone, Northern Ireland

Coordinates: 54.665721°N 7.732867°W

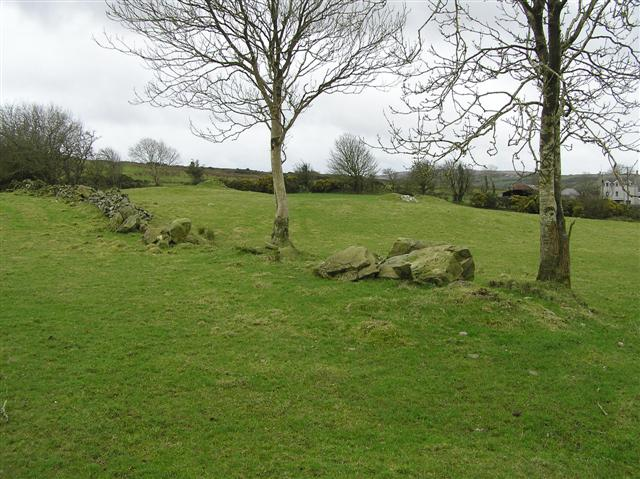
Aghalunny Townland in 2008

Aghalunny is a townland in County Tyrone, Northern Ireland. It is situated in the historic barony of Omagh West and the civil parish of Termonamongan and covers an area of 493 acres.

The name derives from the Irish: Achadh Lughna (Looney's Field), Achadh Leamhnach (Field of the Elms) or Achadh Loinne (Field of the Gladness or Gaiety).

The population of the townland declined during the 19th century:

| Year | 1841 | 1851 | 1861 | 1871 | 1881 | 1891 |
|---|---|---|---|---|---|---|
| Population | 155 | 123 | 109 | 109 | 97 | 108 |
| Houses | 26 | 21 | 19 | 21 | 19 | 19 |

The townland contains one Scheduled Historic Monument: a bridge, known as the Fairy Bridge (grid ref: H1695 7985).

== See also ==
- List of townlands of County Tyrone
- List of archaeological sites in County Tyrone
