= Killynaght =

Townland in County Tyrone, Northern Ireland

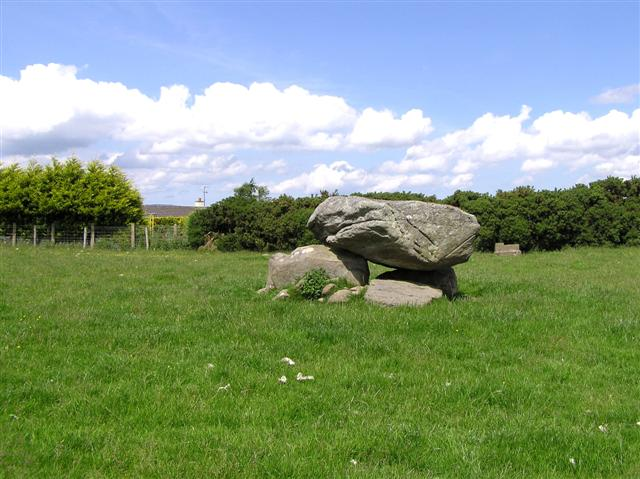
Portal tomb in Killynaght townland in 2006

Killynaght is a townland in County Tyrone, Northern Ireland. It is situated in the barony of Strabane Lower and the civil parish of Leckpatrick and covers an area of 489 acres.

The name derives from the Irish: Coill Uí Neacht (O Knaght's wood).

In 1841 the population of the townland was 191 people (40 houses) and in 1851 it was 155 people (29 houses).

The townland contains one Scheduled Historic Monument: a portal tomb (grid ref: C3909 0113), a collapsed single chambered tomb of four stones, known locally as The Rocking Stone. The capstone is about 1m thick and 2m square.

== See also ==
- List of townlands of County Tyrone
- List of archaeological sites in County Tyrone
