= Termonmaguirk =

Civil parish in County Tyrone, Northern Ireland

Termonmaguirk is a civil parish in County Tyrone, Northern Ireland. It is situated in the historic barony of Omagh East, with a small portion in Strabane Upper.

The parish contains the following towns and villages:

- Carrickmore
- Drumnakilly
- Loughmacrory
- Sixmilecross

Termonmaguirk parish also contains the following 53 townlands:

== A ==
Aghagogan, Aghnaglea, Aghnagregan, Aghnanereagh, Altanagh, Altdrumman, Athenry

== B ==
Ballintrain, Bancran, Bracky

== C ==
Carrickmore, Cavanreagh, Clare, Cloghfin, Cooley, Copney, Creggan, Cregganconroe, Creggandevesky

== D ==
Deroran, Derroar, Drumduff, Drumlister, Drumnakilly, Dunmisk

== E ==
Eskerboy

== G ==
Glen Upper, Gleneeny, Gortfin, Gortfinbar, Granagh

== I ==
Inishative

== L ==
Liskincon, Loughmacrory

== M ==
Merchantstown Glebe, Mullanbeg, Mullanmore, Mulnafye

== O ==
Old Church Yard, Oxtown

== R ==
Ramackan

== S ==
Sixmilecross, Skeboy, Sluggan, Streefe Glebe, Sultan

== T ==
Tanderagee, Tiroony, Tonegan, Tremoge, Tursallagh

== See also ==
- List of civil parishes of County Tyrone
- List of townlands in County Tyrone
