= Rúscaigh =

Rúscaigh (Irish for 'marsh') may refer to several places on the island of Ireland:

- A townland in the parish of Aghadowey, County Londonderry; see List of townlands in County Londonderry
- A townland in the parish of Drumachose, County Londonderry; see List of townlands in County Londonderry
- Rousky, a village in County Tyrone, Northern Ireland
- Roosky, a village in counties Leitrim and Roscommon, Ireland
