= Mallabeny =

- Townland
- Interactive map of Mallabeny
- Country: United Kingdom
- County: Tyrone
- Barony: Clogher
- Civil parish: Clogher

Population (1851)
  - Total: 91

Mallabeny is a townland in County Tyrone, Northern Ireland. It is situated in the barony of Clogher and the civil parish of Clogher and covers an area of 328 acres.

In 1841 the population of the townland was 131 people (25 houses) and in 1851 it was 91 people (16 houses).

The townland contains one Scheduled Historic Monument: a Hillfort (grid ref: H5079 5411), a large circular area, at least 100m in diameter, surrounded by traces of a bank up to 2m high on the outside.

== See also ==
- List of townlands of County Tyrone
- List of archaeological sites in County Tyrone
