= Kilcroagh, County Tyrone =

Townland in County Tyrone, Northern Ireland

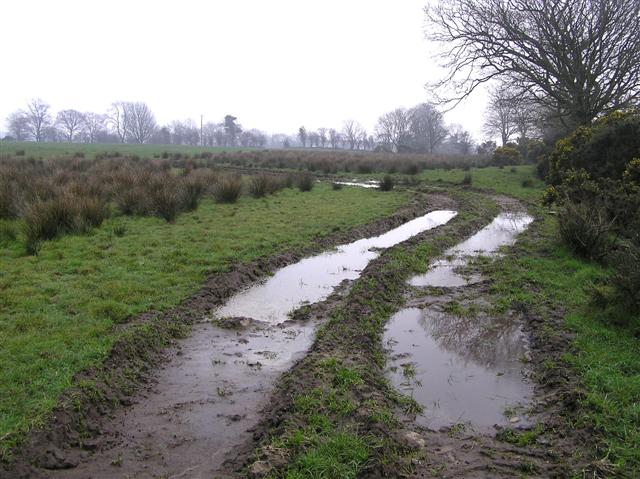
Kilcroagh townland in 2007

Kilcroagh is a townland in County Tyrone, Northern Ireland, near Castlederg. It is situated in the historic barony of Omagh West and the civil parish of Urney and covers an area of 351 acres.

The name derives from the Irish: Coill Chruaiche (wood of the round hill).

The population of the townland declined during the 19th century:

Year	1841	1851	1861	1871	1881	1891
Population	245	183	153	136	137	89
Houses	43	31	32	30	26	23

The townland contains one Scheduled Historic Monument: a standing stone: the White Stone (grid ref: H2554 8487) which stands over 1.5m high and is made almost entirely of quartz, hence the local name.

== See also ==
- List of townlands of County Tyrone
- List of archaeological sites in County Tyrone
