= List of civil parishes of County Tyrone =

In Ireland Counties are divided into civil parishes and parishes are further divided into townlands. The following is a list of parishes in County Tyrone, Northern Ireland:

== A ==
Aghaloo, Aghalurcher, Ardboe, Ardstraw, Artrea

== B ==
Ballinderry, Ballyclog, Bodoney Lower, Bodoney Upper

== C ==
Camus, Cappagh, Carnteel, Clogher, Clogherny, Clonfeacle, Clonoe

== D ==
Derryloran, Desertcreat, Donacavey, Donaghedy, Donaghenry, Donaghmore, Dromore, Drumglass, Drumragh

== E ==
Errigal Keerogue, Errigal Trough

== K ==
Kildress, Killeeshil, Killyman, Kilskeery

== L ==
Learmount, Leckpatrick, Lissan Longfield East, Longfield West

== M ==
Magheracross

== P ==
Pomeroy

== T ==
Tamlaght, Termonamongan, Termonmaguirk, Tullyniskan

== U ==
Urney

== See also ==
- List of townlands in County Tyrone
