= Sixmilecross =

Village in County Tyrone, Northern Ireland

Coordinates: 54.557°N 7.118°W

Sixmilecross: Irish: Na Corracha Mora
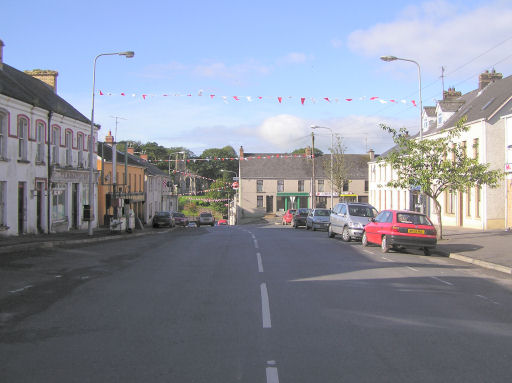
- Population: 282 (2001 Census)
- District: Fermanagh and Omagh
- County: County Tyrone
- Country: Northern Ireland
- Sovereign state: United Kingdom
- Post town: Omagh
- Postcode district: BT79
- Dialling code: 028
- UK Parliament: West Tyrone
- NI Assembly: West Tyrone

Sixmilecross is a townland and small village in County Tyrone, Northern Ireland.

The original Irish name for Sixmilecross is Na Corracha Mora, this refers to marshy ground, probably the ground that runs along the Glusha river at the back of the village. It is situated in the historic barony of Omagh East and the civil parish of Termonmaguirk. The village has a wide, tree lined main street and a population of 282 in the 2001 census.

Sixmilecross is in the Fermanagh and Omagh District Council area about 9 miles (14 kilometres) south-east of Omagh.

== History ==
The great O'Neill dynasty of Tyrone had some connection with the area because the hill above the village was known as Tulach Uí Neill, meaning "O'Neill's Hill". It lies above the Presbyterian Church in the village and is still known as Tullyneil. Tullyneil hill is said to be the geographical centre of Ulster.

Sixmilecross is believed to have been established in 1634. St Michael's Church of Ireland has a stained glass window commemorating the Dunlap family, one of whom, John Dunlap printed the United States Declaration of Independence. The Portadown, Dungannon and Omagh Junction Railway (PD&O) opened Sixmilecross railway station in September 1861 and the Ulster Transport Authority closed the station and the PD&O line in February 1965.

== People ==
- Willie Anderson (rugby coach), was born here.
- Mic Christopher, singer-songwriter, has maternal roots here; his mother, Vaun (née Heaney), comes from Sixmilecross.
- W.F. Marshall, whose contribution to the cultural heritage of mid- and west Tyrone has been commemorated by the Marshall Trail, a tourist trail featuring many of the places mentioned in his works.

== Demographics ==
On census day in April 2011, the resident population of Sixmilecross Ward was 2,374. Of these:

- 26.07% were under 16 years old and 10.57% were aged 65 and over;
- 51.68% of the population were male and 48.32% were female;
- 77.51% were from a Catholic community background;
- 21.52% were from a 'Protestant and Other Christian (including Christian related)' community background;
- 33 years was the average age of the population;
- 20.12% had some knowledge of Irish, 3.90% had some knowledge of Ulster-Scots and 1.73% did not have English as their first Language

== See also ==
- List of villages in Northern Ireland
- List of towns in Northern Ireland
