= Tullyhogue Fort =

Large mound in Tullyhogue, County Tyrone, Northern Ireland

Coordinates: 54°36′36″N 6°43′23″W

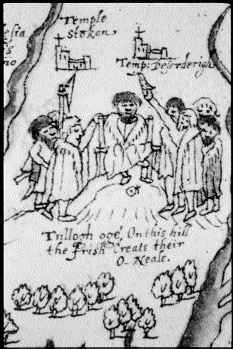
Detail of a copy of Richard Bartlett's 1602 map of Ulster that included this depiction of an O'Neill inauguration on Tullyhogue. A figure on the right, an O'Cahan, can be seen holding a shoe over the chief's head as part of the "single shoe" ritual

Tullyhogue Fort, also spelt Tullaghoge or Tullahoge (from Middle Irish Tulach Óc meaning "hill of youth" or "mound of the young warriors"), is a large mound on the outskirts of Tullyhogue village near Cookstown, County Tyrone, Northern Ireland. It has a depressed centre and is surrounded by trees. It is an ancient ceremonial site where the Chiefs of the Clan O'Neill of Tyrone were inaugurated.

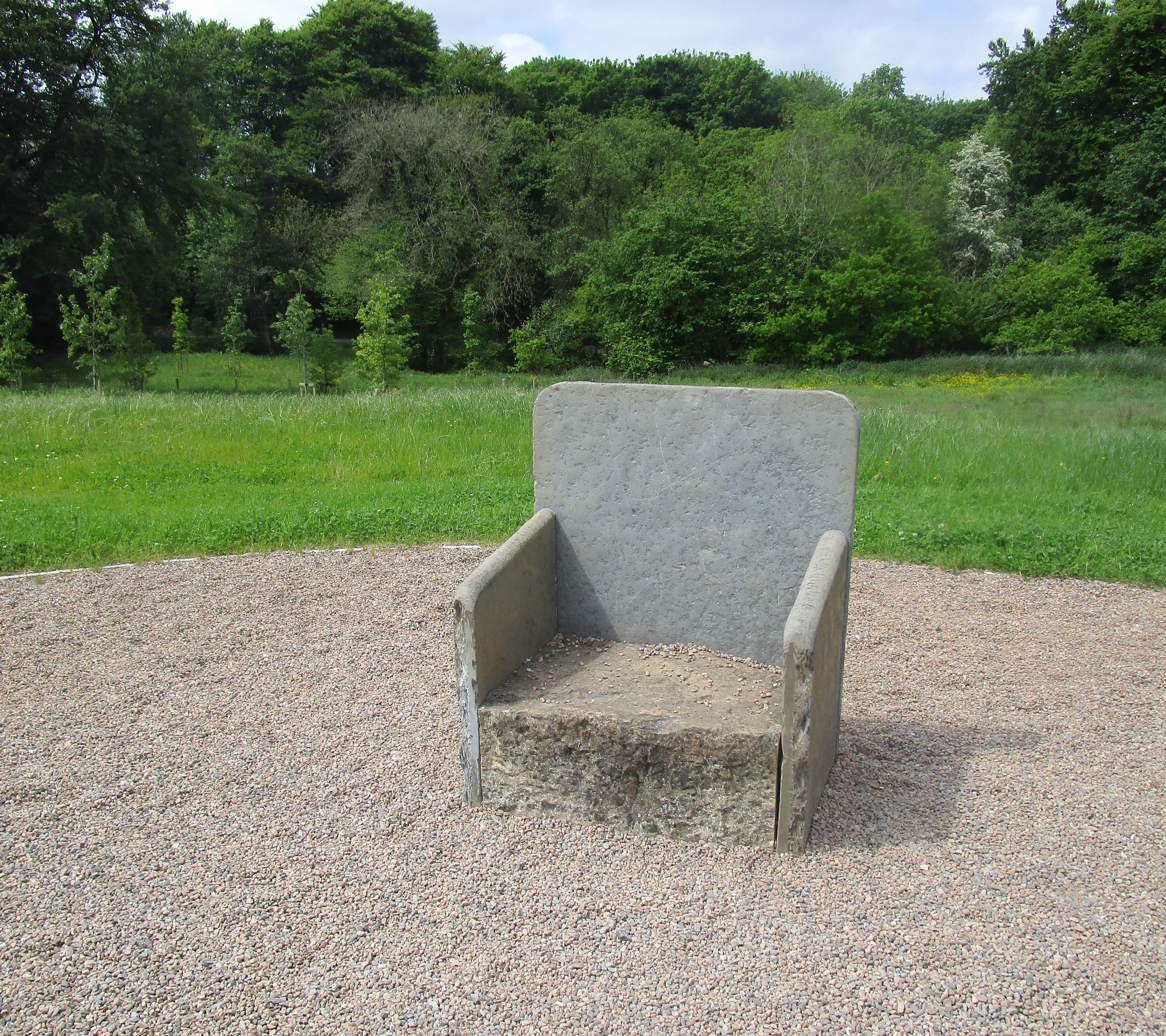
Reconstructed Tullahogue fort inauguration stone

It is a State Care Historic Monument sited in the townland of Ballymully Glebe, in the Cookstown District Council area, at grid reference: H8250 7430. The inauguration site is a Scheduled Historic Monument at grid ref: H8251 7428.

== History ==
The date of the construction of Tullyhogue fort is not known; however, it is believed to have held great significance from early times, possessing a form of ritual importance long before the O'Neills became associated with the site.

Tullyhogue ráth was originally associated with the Uí Tuirtri of Airgialla who were displaced by branches of the Cenél nEógain. The first to enter the area in the tenth-century were the Cenél mBinnig who are described in their genealogies in the twelfth-century manuscript Rawlinson B 502 as of 'Tilcha Oc'. Over time they moved north into Glenconkeyne and Loughinsholin and were replaced by the Cenél Feargusa who included the O'Hagans, supporters of the O'Neill dynasty interest. Before 1056 they took possession of the site as 'reachtaire' (steward or controller of the royal household) which they continued to occupy down to the 17th century. At this time the Cenél nEógain had been largely bereft of effective leadership candidates and the branches in the Tulach Óc district made the unusual political decision to import an alien dynasty; Conchobar and his brother Cennétig, grandsons of Donnchadh mac Briain, bitter rivals to the main branch of the royal Munster O'Brien dynasty. They became successive 'Kings of Telach Óc' for a short period before 1084 with the support of the Meic Lochlainn who were happy to deprive potential internal rivals of a secure base of operation. The Ua Briain branch was unable to establish itself permanently but the disruption allowed Domnall Ua Lochlainn, son-in-law to Cennétig, to become King of Ailech in 1083 and the threat of Ó Néill rivals disappeared for a number of generations. The O'Hagans continued to dwell at the site and became its hereditary guardians, with their burial place at Donaghrisk situated at the bottom of the hill. In the later medieval period it became the inauguration site of the O'Neill dynasty, where the title An Ó Néill ('The O'Neill') was bestowed upon each new lord. The inauguration was carried out by the heads of the O'Cahan and O'Hagan. O'Cahan, the O'Neill's principal sub-chief, would throw a golden sandal over the new lord's head to signify good fortune. O'Hagan, being the hereditary guardian of Tullyhogue, would place the shoe on the O'Neill's foot and present him with a rod of office.

The inauguration of Hugh O'Neill, Earl of Tyrone in 1595 (Note: One source dates this event to 1595) was the last such event for an O'Neill to take place at Tullyhogue.

=== Leac na Rí ===
The inauguration stone was a large boulder known as the Leac na Rí, which meant 'the flagstone of the kings'. It stood outside Tullyhogue fort where, by the 16th century, it had become incorporated into a ceremonial stone chair where three large slabs had been placed around it.

In 1602 (Note: Dates ranging from 1602–1607 are given by different sources, 1603 is the most commonly cited) during the Nine Years War, Lord Mountjoy, in charge of the English forces at war with Lord Tyrone, smashed the inauguration stone to symbolically end the O'Neill's sovereignty.

The Leac na Rí is stated as being the Ulster counterpart to the Stone of Destiny, which is now kept at Edinburgh Castle and is used as part of the Coronation Chair in Westminster Abbey during the Coronation of the British monarch. The Leac na Rí is also stated as reputedly having been blessed by St. Patrick.

== See also ==
- List of archaeological sites in County Tyrone
- Royal sites of Ireland
- Cenél nEógain
- Kings of Tír Eógain
- O'Neill dynasty
- Dungannon
