= Desertcreat =

Parish and townland in Northern Ireland

Coordinates: 54.602°N 6.743°W

Desertcreat is a parish and a townland in County Tyrone, Northern Ireland. The civil parish of Desertcreat is in the eastern part of County Tyrone in the barony Dungannon Upper, immediately south of the parish of Derryloran, which contains the town of Cookstown, and immediately north of the parish of Pomeroy. The parish has a Church of Ireland Church in the townland of Desertcreat (OS ref:H813733). Patrick Donnelley, the Roman Catholic Bishop who was known as Phelim Brady or the 'Bard of Armagh', is buried in the church graveyard.

It contains the following townlands: Allen, Annaghananam, Annaghmore, Annaghquin, Annaghteige, Annahavil, Ballymully Glebe, Ballynacroy, Ballynakilly, Bardahessiagh, Cady, Carnenny, Cross Glebe, Derrygortanea, Derryhash, Derryraghan, Desertcreat, Donaghrisk, Downs, Drumballyhugh, Drummillard, Drumraw, Edendoit, Finvey, Galcussagh, Gortacar (Doris), Gortacar (Glassy), Gortagowan, Gortavale, Gortavilly, Gortfad, Gortfad Glebe, Gortindarragh, Grange, Killycolp, Killygarvan, Killyneedan, Kiltyclay, Kiltyclogher, Knockavaddy, Lammy, Legacurry, Lime Hill, Lisnanane, Low Cross, Moneygaragh, Morree, Moymore, Moynagh, Mullaghshantullagh, Mullynure, Oughterard, Pomeroy, Rockdale, Sessiagh (Lindesay), Sessiagh (Scott), Shivey, Skenahergny, Skenarget, Tirnaskea, Tirnaskea (Bayly), Tolvin and Tullaghoge.

== Desertcreat Townland ==
The townland is situated in the historic barony of Dungannon Upper and the civil parish of Desertcreat and covers an area of 123 acres.

The population of the townland declined during the 19th century:

Year	1841	1851	1861	1871	1881	1891
Population	65	26	36	39	48	34
Houses	13	10	9	7	11	8

== See also ==
- List of townlands of County Tyrone
- List of civil parishes of County Tyrone
