= Royal sites of Ireland =

Seats of Gaelic Irish kingdoms

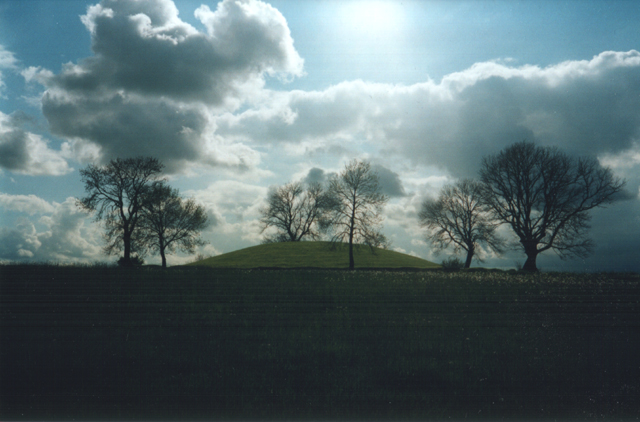
The royal site of the kings of Ulster, Eamhain Mhacha, now known as Navan Fort

The royal sites of Ireland were the seats of the Gaelic kings of Ireland. Medieval sources describe them as the ceremonial capitals of various Irish kingdoms, where kingly inaugurations, assemblies and athletic games were held. Archaeological investigations show that many royal sites were culturally significant for thousands of years before recorded history, and they often include ancient monuments such as Neolithic burial mounds, standing stones, cairns and enclosures.

Each Irish kingdom is thought to have had its own royal site, but six sites are considered to be the most important. These are Tara (Irish: Teamhair), seat of the Kings of Meath and the High King, along with the provincial capitals: Navan Fort (Eamhain Macha) for Ulster; Rathcroghan (Cruachan) for Connacht; Knockaulin (Dún Ailinne) for Leinster; and Cashel (Caiseal) for Munster. Uisneach represented the union of the provinces and may have served as a meeting place for the kings. These major sites, excluding Navan Fort (in Northern Ireland), have been listed as a potential UNESCO World Heritage Site.

These primary sites might be associated with less prominent sites that served other purposes for the kingship. For instance, the King of Tara presided over assemblies at Tailtiu (Teltown) and Tlachgta (the Hill of Ward) during the Lughnasadh festival.

== Features of a royal site ==
Historian Michael Herity analysed several historically designated royal sites to determine what feature they shared. He noted that each had ring-barrows, most had hillforts and linear earthwork avenues, a few had cairns or standing stones, but he noted the lack of these may have been due to these structures' fragility. Herity also notes that literary sources celebrate these sites as cemeteries and may indicate ancestor worship. Herity also notes that a composite mound and circular enclosure structure, exemplified by the combination of An Forradh and Teach Cormaic, is almost exclusively found on royal sites. Less frequent features include sacred trees ("bileda"), stone chairs, inauguration stones, stone basins, and churches.

== Inauguration sites ==
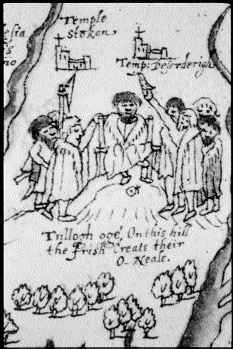
Detail of a copy of Richard Bartlett's 1602 map of Ulster that included this depiction of an Uí Néill (O'Neil) inauguration on Tulach Óg. A figure on the right, an Ó Catháin, can be seen holding a shoe over the king's head as part of the "single shoe" ritual.

Many royal sites served as ceremonial locations for inauguration ceremonies. The prospective monarchs benefited from associating themselves with the ancient monuments and cultural significance of the royal sites. Inauguration ceremonies treated the prospective king's lands as "betrothed" and the rituals followed the pattern of a marital feast or banais righe. The hilltop location of the inauguration sites offered panoramic views of the "betrothed" lands during the ceremony. Similar feis ceremonies in the early Middle Ages represented a direct marriage between the king and a goddess representing his lands. The significance of the marriage analogy declined in the later Middle Ages as kingship became more oriented toward ownership.

Historical accounts of inauguration ceremonies are scarce and varied. One account suggests that the Cenél Conaill king mated with a mare, had it ritually slaughtered and boiled, and then bathed in its broth while his subjects drank from the bath. This accounts has been criticised as propaganda designed to make the Irish look barbarous or pagan but would be consistent with an Indo-European tradition of inaugural horse slaughter. Records of inaugurations in the later Middle Ages indicate that there was no set inauguration ceremony, but races, drinking liquor, reading poetry, processions representing the kings lands, and granting the White Wand or rod of sovereignty seem to have been basic parts of the ceremony. Some inaugurations included the rite of the "single shoe." Accounts document the use of the rite at the inaugurations of the Uí Choncobhair in the fifteenth century and the Uí Néill and Méig Uidhir in the sixteenth century. An account of the Choncobhair ceremony records the would-be king leaving a single slipper at his inauguration site to signify his claim. The next day, the Mac Diarmada, a vassal family with the role of "king-maker", placed a shoe on his lord's foot during the inauguration. In the Uí Néill ceremony, the would-be king sat on a stone chair on the inauguration hill and Uí Ágáin or, in later ceremonies, Ó Catháin, (king-makers for the Uí Néill), cast the shoe over the seated prince's head. The throwing of the shoe may have been evolved from a tradition of throwing a shoe for good luck. The shoe may also be related to the footprints carved in inaugural stones.

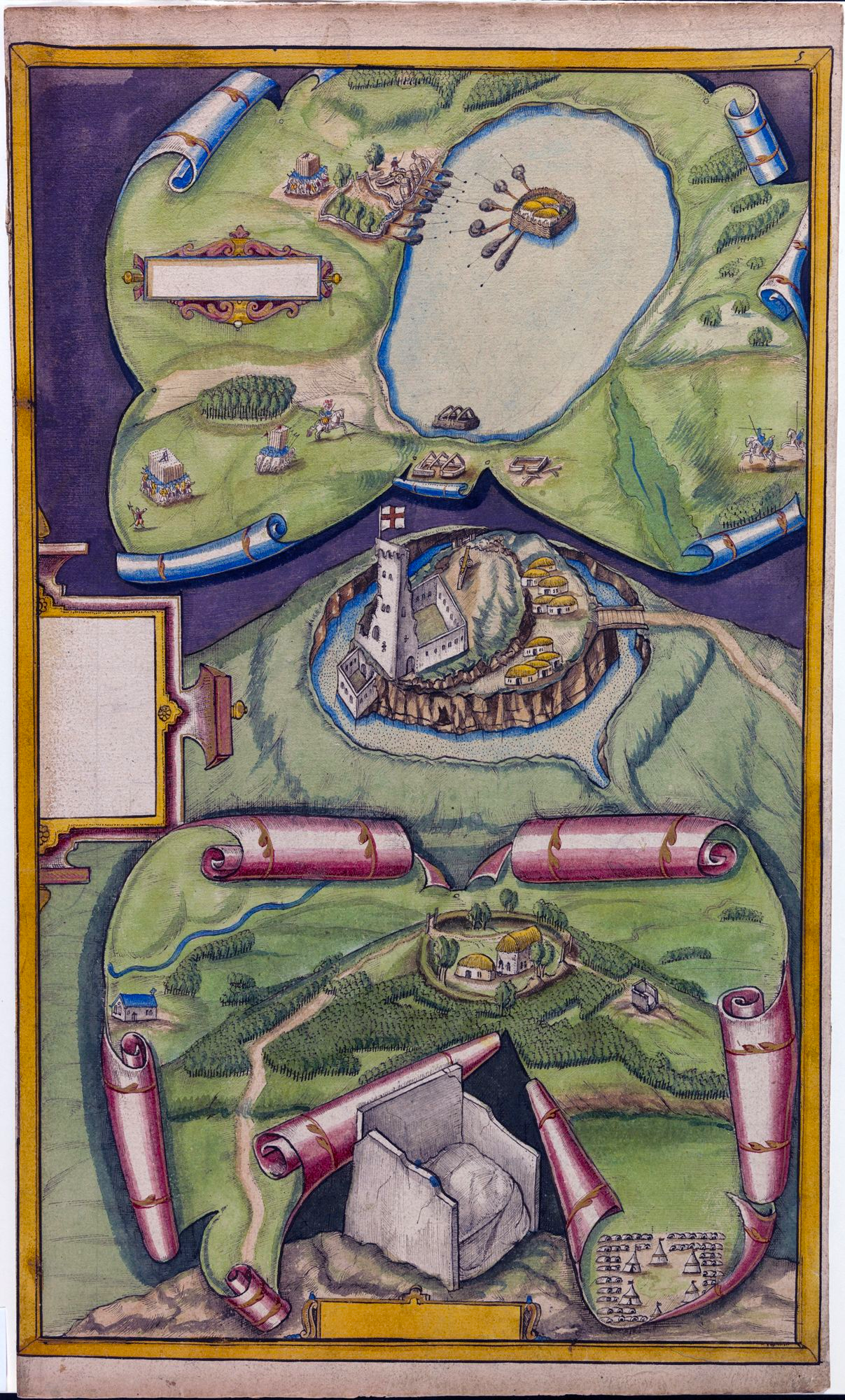
Detail of Bartlett's map with an inuauguration chair located at Tullyhogue Fort, County Tyrone at the bottom.

Inauguration sites had a diversity of features, attesting to their diverse ancient origins. Some of these ancient features seem to have been adapted for the purpose of inauguration ceremonies such as the flattening of the top of a burial mound. Many inauguration sites have small mounds with a flattened area on top just large enough for a man to stand on. These features have been interpreted as "throne mounds," and might have allowed a king to stand on a summit and survey the lands and people below. Several cases of using stone inauguration chairs were documented, although the use of a more conventional chair "throne" was probably an import dating to the later medieval period. Cartographer Richard Bartlett drew the chair at Tulach Óg the inauguration site of the Ui Neill of Tir Eoghain. The only extant Irish inauguration chair, now in the Ulster Museum, belonged to the Ui Neill dynasty of the Clann Aeda Buide.

== Other royal sites ==
- Aileach, early medieval seat of the Cenél nEógain of the Northern Uí Néill, referred to as the "Kings of Ailech". Their seat moved to Tulach Óg at the beginning of the eleventh century.
- Tullahoge (Tulach Óg), coronation place of the Ó Néill kings of Tír Eoghain from the eleventh century.
- Clogher (Clochar mac nDaimine), royal seat of the Uí Chremthainn dynasty, of the kingdom of Airgialla.
- Croghan Hill (Brí Éile), coronation place of the kings of Uí Failghe.
- Down Mound or Dun-da-lethglas (Dún da Lethglas), probable royal seat of the Dál Fiatach kings of Ulaid.
- Emly (Medón Mairtíne), ancient capital of central Munster and the Mairtine.
- Bruree (Brugh Rígh), ancient alternative capital of Munster and later capital of the Uí Fidgenti.
- Knowth (Cnoghbha), royal seat of the Síl nÁedo Sláine kings of Brega from the beginning of the ninth century.
- Knock Iveagh (Cnoc Uíbh Eachach), coronation place of the Magennis chiefs of Iveagh.
- Magh Adhair, coronation place of the Dál gCais and later O'Brien dynasty, kings of Thomond.
- Skeagoura (Sciath Ghabhra), coronation place of the Maguire kings and chiefs of Fermanagh.
- Shantemon Hill, Co. Cavan, a bronze age stone row called Finn McCool's Fingers inauguration place of the O'Reilly chiefs of East Breifne from the twelfth to seventeenth centuries
