= Aghaloo =

Civil parish in County Tyrone, Northern Ireland

Aghaloo is a civil parish in County Tyrone, Northern Ireland. It is situated in the historic barony of Dungannon Lower.

The Parish contains the following towns and villages:

- Aughnacloy
- Caledon
- Carnteel

The Parish contains the following 68 townlands:

== A ==
Aghenis, Annacramp, Annagh, Annagh More, Annaghroe, Annaghsallagh, Ards

== B ==
Ballagh, Ballyboy, Ballyvaddy, Bohard

== C ==
Caledon, Carricklongfield, Cavanboy, Creevelough, Crilly, Cronghill, Culligan, Cumber, Curlagh

== D ==
Demesne, Derrycourtney, Derrygooly, Derrykintone, Derrylappen, Dromore, Drumearn, Drumess, Drummond, Dunmacmay, Dyan

== E ==
Edenageeragh, Enagh

== F ==
Finglush

== G ==
Glasdrummond, Glenarb, Glencrew, Glendavagh, Glenkeen, Guiness

== K ==
Kedew, Kilgowney, Killynaul, Kilmore, Kilsampson, Kilsannagh, Knockaginny, Knocknaroy

== L ==
Lairakean, Legane, Lismulladown

== M ==
Millberry, Mullaghmore East, Mullaghmore West, Mullaghmossagh, Mullintor, Mullycarnan, Mullynaveagh, Mullyneill, Mulnahorn

== R ==
Ramaket, Rehaghy

== S ==
Stragrane

== T ==
Tannagh, Tannaghlane, Tullyblety, Tullnashane, Tullyremon

== See also ==
- List of civil parishes of County Tyrone
- List of townlands in County Tyrone
