= Clonfeacle =

Civil parish in Northern Ireland

Clonfeacle (Irish: Cluain Fiacal) is a civil parish in County Armagh and County Tyrone, Northern Ireland. It is split across the historic baronies of Armagh and Oneilland West in County Armagh and Dungannon Lower and Dungannon Middle in County Tyrone.

The parish contains the following 122 townlands:

== A ==
Altnavannog, Anagasna Glebe, Annagh

== B ==
Ballycullen or Drumask, Ballycullen or Shanmullagh, Ballymackilduff, Ballytroddan, Benburb, Blackwatertown or Lisbofin, Boland, Brossloy, Broughadowey

== C ==
Cadian, Canary, Carrowbeg, Carrowcolman, Carrycastle, Clogherny, Clonbeg, Clonmore, Clonteevy, Coolcush, Coolkill, Copney, Cormullagh, Creaghan, Crew, Crossteely, Crubinagh, Culkeeran, Culrevog, Curran

== D ==
Derrycaw, Derrycreevy, Derrycreevy (Knox), Derryfubble, Derrygoonan, Derrygortrevy, Derrylattinee, Derrymagowan, Derryoghill, Derryscollop, Donnydeade, Drain, Drumanuey, Drumarn, Drumask or Ballycullen, Drumay, Drumcullen, Drumderg, Drumflugh, Drumgart, Drumgold, Drumgormal, Drumgose, Drumgrannon, Drumlee, Drummond, Drumnamoless, Drumnashaloge, Drumnastrade, Drumskinny, Dunamony, Dunseark

== F ==
Finelly

== G ==
Garvaghy, Gorestown, Gort, Gortmerron, Grange

== K ==
Killybracken, Kilmore, Kilnacart, Kilnagrew, Knockarogan Glebe, Knocknacloy

== L ==
Legilly, Lisbancarney, Lisbanlemneigh, Lisbofin or Blackwatertown, Lisdermot, Lisduff, Lisgobban, Lismulrevy, Lisnacroy, Lisroan, Lissan, Listamlet

== M ==
Mossmore, Moy, Moyard, Moygashel, Mulboy, Mullaghboy, Mullaghdaly, Mullaghlongfield, Mullaghmossog Glebe, Mullanary, Mullybrannon, Mullycar, Mullycarnan, Mullyleggan

== R ==
Roan

== S ==
Sanaghanroe, Sessiamagaroll, Seyloran, Shanmoy, Shanmullagh or Ballycullen, Stangmore (Knox), Stangmore (Magee), Stiloga, Syerla

== T ==
Terryglassog, Terryscollop, Tireagerty, Tobermesson Glebe, Tullydowey, Tullygiven, Tullygoney, Tullykevan, Tullylearn, Tullyroan, Turleenan, Tyhan

== See also ==
- List of civil parishes of County Armagh
- List of civil parishes of County Tyrone
