= Tullyhogue =

Coordinates: 54.606°N 6.724°W

Tullyhogue: Irish: Tulach Óg
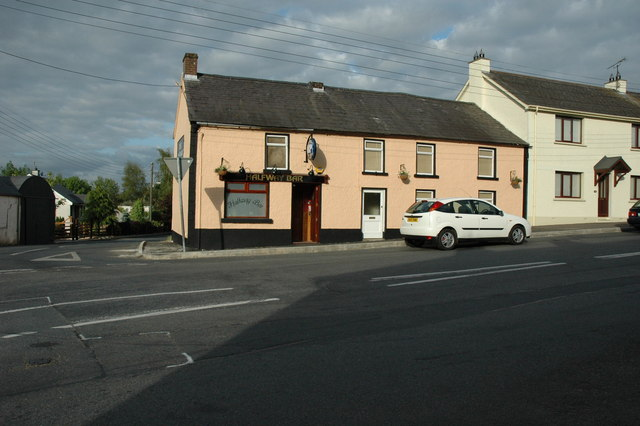
- Halfway Bar in Tullyhogue

- Location within Northern Ireland
- District: Mid Ulster
- County: County Tyrone
- Country: Northern Ireland
- Sovereign state: United Kingdom
- Post town: COOKSTOWN
- Postcode district: BT80
- Dialling code: 028
- UK Parliament: Mid Ulster
- NI Assembly: Mid Ulster

Tullyhogue, also called Tullaghoge or Tullahoge (from Irish Tulach Óg 'hill of youth'), is a small village and townland in County Tyrone, Northern Ireland. It is within the civil parish of Desertcreat and is about two miles or three kilometres south of Cookstown.

Nearby Tullyhogue Fort was the crowning place of the kings of Tír Eoghain until the Flight of the Earls in 1607.

== Notable people ==
- Alexander Carson (1776—1844) – Irish Baptist pastor and writer. Carson attended school in Tullyhogue.
