= Tullyniskan =

Civil parish in Northern Ireland

Tullyniskan (Irish: Tulaigh Naoscan) is a civil parish in Northern Ireland, in the traditional county of County Tyrone, Ireland. It has an area of 18.1 square kilometres (4,500 acres; 7.0 sq mi).

There are 27 townlands in Tullyniskan.

== List of townlands ==
=== A ===
- Achadh Cinn Saileach
- Aghakinsallagh Glebe

=== B ===
- Baile Meadhonach
- Ballymenagh
- Blacktown,
- Bloomhill Demesne,

=== C ===
- Carn
- Creenagh
- Críonach
- Cuileann
- Cullion
- Curran

=== D ===
- Derry
- Derrywinnin Glebe
- Doire
- Doire Mhaine
- DorasEdendork

=== F ===
- Farlough
- Fuar-loch

=== G ===
- Gleann Con
- Glencon
- Gort Gonaidh
- Gort na Sceach
- Gortgonis
- Gortin
- Gortnaskea
- Guirtin

=== M ===
- Min na bhFiach
- Mineveigh
- Mullach Margaidh
- Mullaghmarget

=== Q ===
- Quintinmanus

=== S ===
- Seiseadhach
- Sessia
- Stucan
- Stughan

=== W ===
- Whitetown
- Woodhill

== See also ==
- List of civil parishes of County Tyrone
- List of townlands in County Tyrone
