= Killeter =

Coordinates: 54.6687°N 7.6823°W

Killeter: Irish: Coill Íochtair
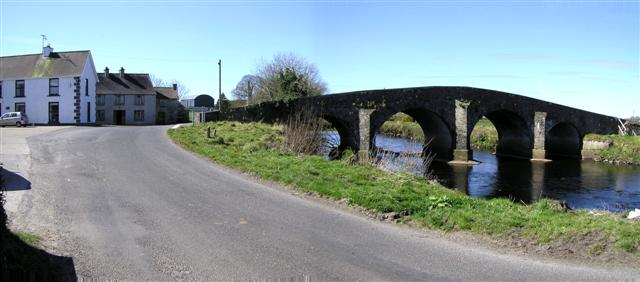
- Killeter Bridge

- Location within Northern Ireland
- Population: 93 (2021 census)
- Irish grid reference: H240806
- District: Strabane
- County: County Tyrone
- Country: Northern Ireland
- Sovereign state: United Kingdom
- Post town: CASTLEDERG
- Postcode district: BT81
- Dialling code: 028, +44 28
- UK Parliament: West Tyrone
- NI Assembly: West Tyrone

Killeter (from Irish Coill Íochtair, meaning 'lower wood') is a small village and townland near Castlederg in County Tyrone, Northern Ireland. In the 2021 census it had a population of 93.

Killeter has a yearly August fair, which "celebrates the diversity and richness of rural life". The village itself sits along an ancient pilgrimage trail which winds its way to Lough Derg. The national cycle network traverses part of this trail, which is bounded to the west by Killeter Forest.

The writer Benedict Kiely has stated that he based the fictional village of Carmincross, in his novel Nothing Happens in Carmincross, on Killeter.

== History ==
Near Killeter is the Magherakeel (from Irish Machaire Chille, meaning 'plain of the church') ecclesiastical site. This site contains a holy well, lime kiln and ruins of a 6th century church.

On 29 April 1844, a shower of meteoric stones fell, in the sight of several people, at Killeter. They were broken into small fragments and only one piece was found whole.

Killeter, plus the rural protrusion of Tyrone to its immediate west, would have been transferred to the Irish Free State had the recommendations of the Irish Boundary Commission been enacted in 1925.
