= Dungannon (barony) =

Dungannon (named after the town of Dungannon) is the name of a former barony in present-day County Tyrone, Northern Ireland. In 1613 it was enlarged with its amalgamation with the barony of Mountjoy and the south-west corner of the barony of Loughinsholin. By 1851 it was split into three baronies:

- Dungannon Lower
- Dungannon Middle
- Dungannon Upper
