= Rousky =

Village in County Tyrone, Northern Ireland

Coordinates: 54°43′N 7°09′W

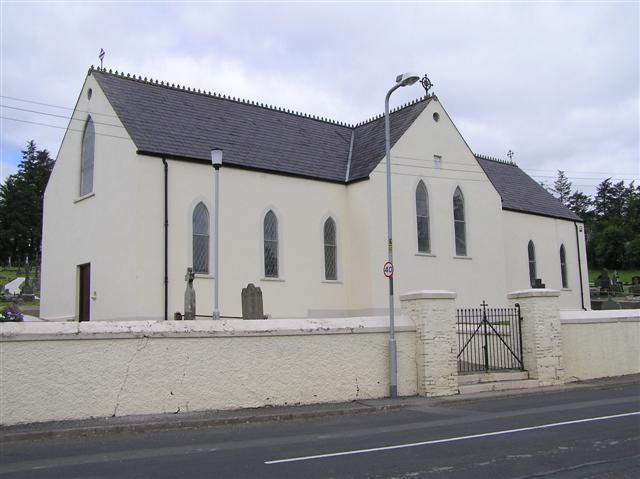
St. Mary's Roman Catholic Church

Rousky (from Irish Rúscaigh) is the name of a small village and of a townland in the Sperrin Mountains of County Tyrone, Northern Ireland. In the 2021 census it had a population of 51.

Rousky is on the main road between Gortin (to the west) and Greencastle (to the east). It lies within the parish of Badoney Lower, the barony of Strabane Upper and the Omagh District Council area.
