= Lissan =

Coordinates: 54.687°N 6.753°W

Lissan: Irish: Lios Áine
- Civil parish
- Location within Northern Ireland
- District: Mid Ulster
- County: County Londonderry; County Tyrone
- Country: Northern Ireland
- Sovereign state: United Kingdom
- Post town: COOKSTOWN
- Postcode district: BT80
- Police: Northern Ireland
- Fire: Northern Ireland
- Ambulance: Northern Ireland
- UK Parliament: Mid Ulster
- NI Assembly: Mid Ulster

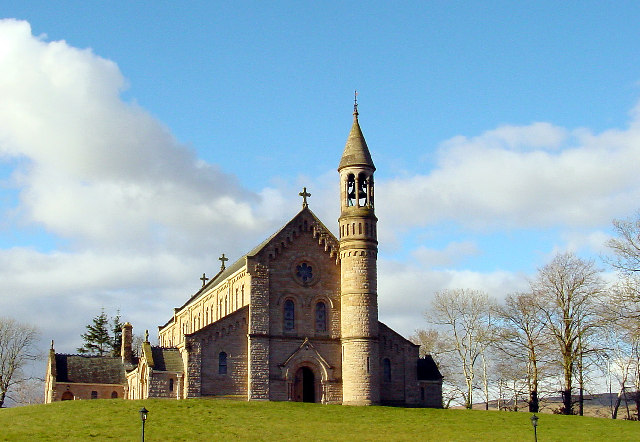
Roman Catholic Church of St Michael, Lissan Parish (March 2005)

Lissan (from Irish Lios Áine, meaning 'Aine's fort') is a civil and Anglican and Roman Catholic ecclesiastical parish that spans parts of County Londonderry and County Tyrone, Northern Ireland.

The local Roman Catholic Church, the Church of St Michael in Cookstown, was built in 1908. The local Anglican church, Lissan Parish Church, is in Churchtown.

== Education ==
The local Catholic primary school is Lissan Primary. Formerly, Creivagh Primary school was in the parish, but closed in 2015.

The nearest secondary schools are in Cookstown: Holy Trinity College (Catholic) and the Cookstown High School (controlled).

The nearest third-level institution is South West College, with a campus in Cookstown.

== Sport ==
- Lissan GAC is the local Gaelic Athletic Association club.

== See also ==
- List of civil parishes of County Londonderry
- List of civil parishes of County Tyrone
