= Dungannon Upper =

Barony in County Tyrone, Northern Ireland

Dungannon Upper Dún Geanainn Uachtarach (Irish)
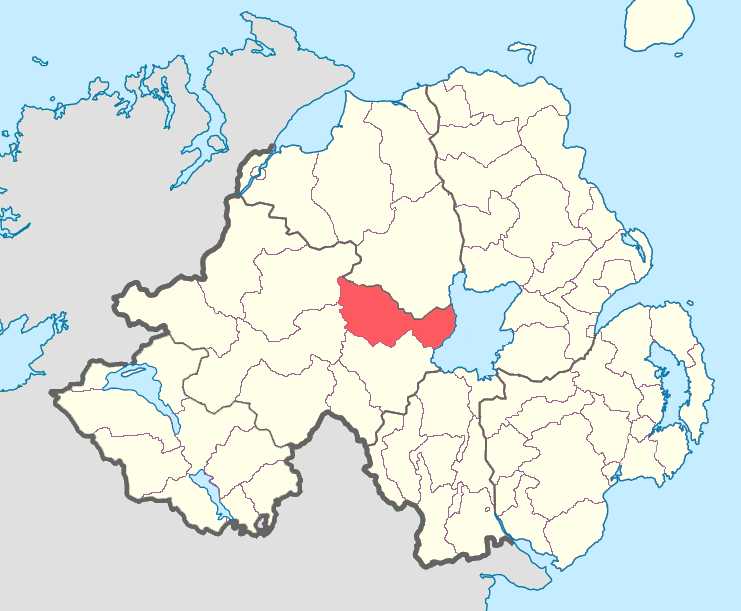
- Location of Dungannon Upper, County Tyrone, Northern Ireland.

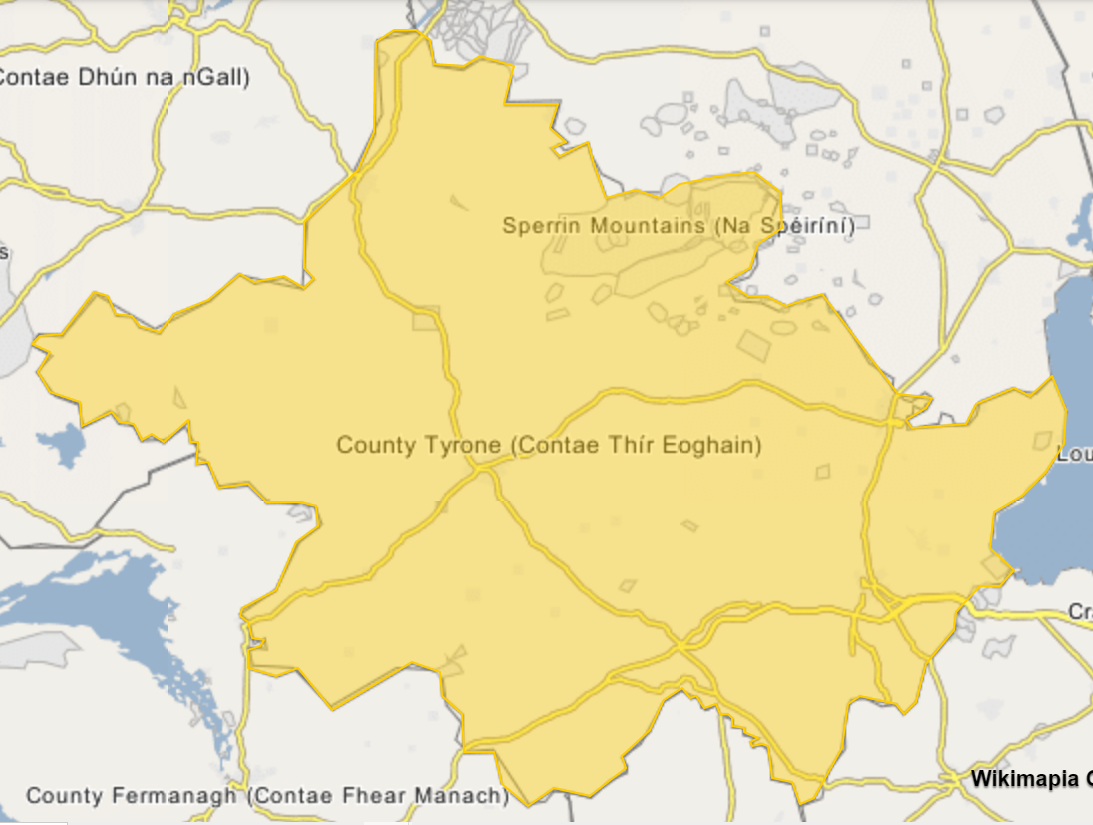
- Location within County Tyrone Location within Northern Ireland
- Sovereign state: United Kingdom
- Country: Northern Ireland
- County: Tyrone

Dungannon Upper is a barony in County Tyrone, Northern Ireland. It was created in 1851 with the splitting of the barony of Dungannon. Lough Neagh runs along its eastern boundary, and it is bordered by four other baronies: Dungannon Middle to the south; Loughinsholin to the north; Strabane Upper to the north-west; and Omagh East to the south-west.

== List of main settlements ==
- Ardboe
- Coagh
- Cookstown
- Tullyhogue

== List of civil parishes ==
Below is a list of civil parishes in Dungannon Upper:

- Arboe (split with barony of Loughinsholin)
- Artrea (split with barony of Loughinsholin)
- Ballinderry (split with barony of Loughinsholin)
- Ballyclog
- Derryloran (split with barony of Loughinsholin)
- Desertcreat
- Kildress
- Lissan (also partly in barony of Loughinsholin)
- Tamlaght (split with barony of Loughinsholin)
