= Dungannon Middle =

Dungannon Middle Dún Geanainn Láir (Irish)
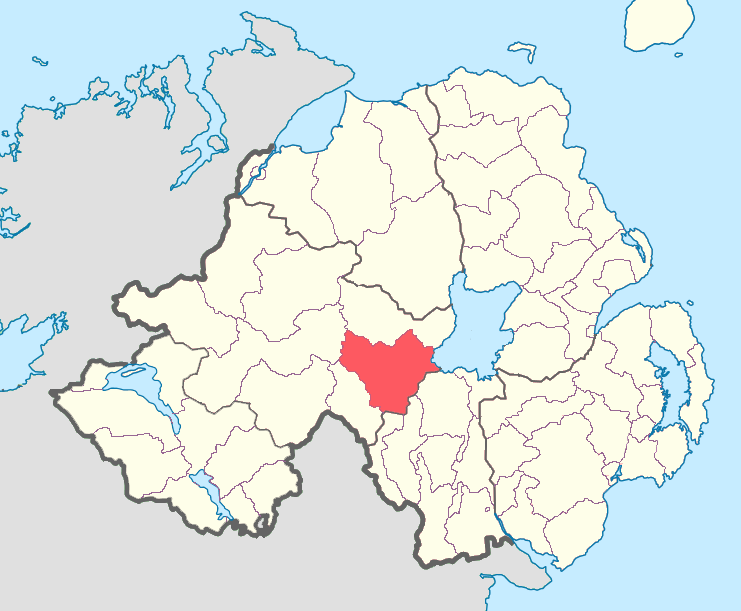
- Location of Dungannon Middle, County Tyrone, Northern Ireland.
- Sovereign state: United Kingdom
- Country: Northern Ireland
- County: County Tyrone

Dungannon Middle (named after Dungannon town) is a barony in County Tyrone, Northern Ireland. It was created in 1851 with the splitting of the barony of Dungannon. It is bordered by Lough Neagh to the east and six other baronies: Dungannon Upper to the north; Oneilland West to the south-east; Armagh and Tiranny to the south; Dungannon Lower to the south-west; and Omagh East to the west.

== List of main settlements ==
- Castlecaulfield
- Coalisland
- Donaghmore
- Dungannon
- Moy
- Moygashel
- Pomeroy
- Stewartstown

== List of civil parishes ==
Below is a list of civil parishes in Dungannon Middle:

- Clonfeacle (split with baronies of Dungannon Lower, Armagh and Oneilland West)
- Clonoe
- Donaghenry
- Donaghmore
- Drumglass
- Killyman (split with barony of Oneilland West)
- Pomeroy
- Tullyniskan
