= Strabane Upper =

Strabane Upper An Srath Bán Uachtarach (Irish)
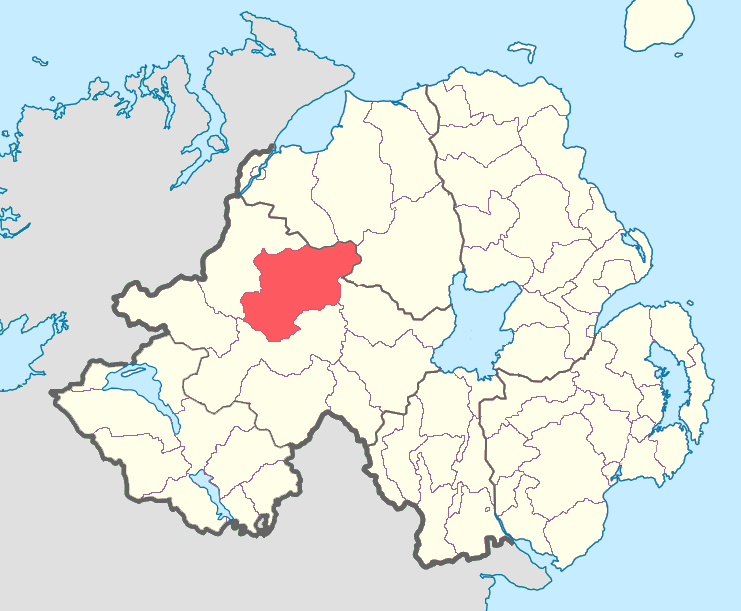
- Location of Strabane Upper, County Tyrone, Northern Ireland.
- Sovereign state: United Kingdom
- Country: Northern Ireland
- County: Tyrone

Strabane Upper (named after Strabane) is a barony in County Tyrone, Northern Ireland. It is bordered by six other baronies: Tirkeeran and Keenaght to the north; Loughinsholin and Dungannon Upper to the east; Omagh East to the south; and Strabane Lower to the west.

It was subdivided by 1851 from the earlier Strabane barony.

== List of settlements ==
Below is a list of the main settlements in Strabane Upper:

=== Villages ===
- Brockagh (also known as Mountjoy)
- Cranagh
- Drumnakilly
- Gortin
- Greencastle
- Knockmoyle
- Mountfield
- Plumbridge

== List of civil parishes ==
Below is a list of civil parishes in Strabane Upper:

- Bodoney Lower
- Bodoney Upper
- Cappagh (split with barony of Omagh East)
- Termonmaguirk (split with barony of Omagh East)
