= Omagh East =

Omagh East An Ómaigh Thoir (Irish)
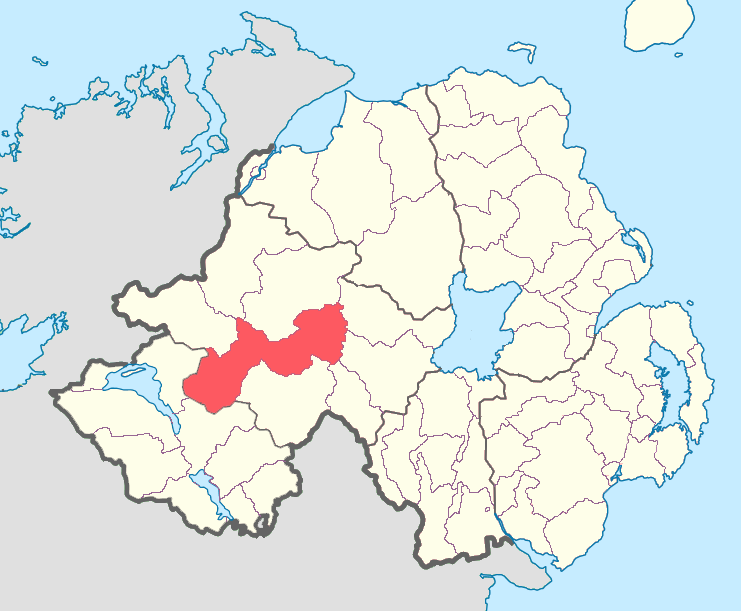
- Location of Omagh East, County Tyrone, Northern Ireland.
- Sovereign state: United Kingdom
- Country: Northern Ireland
- County: Tyrone

Omagh East (named after Omagh town) is a barony in County Tyrone, Northern Ireland. It is bordered by nine other baronies: Omagh West and Lurg to the west; Strabane Lower and Strabane Upper to the north; Dungannon Middle and Dungannon Upper to the east; Clogher and Tirkennedy to the south; and Dungannon Lower to the south-east.

== List of main settlements ==
- Beragh
- Carrickmore
- Dromore
- Omagh

== List of civil parishes ==
Below is a list of civil parishes in Omagh East:

- Cappagh (split with Strabane Upper)
- Clogherny
- Donacavey (split with barony of Clogher)
- Dromore
- Drumragh
- Kilskeery
- Magheracross (split with barony of Tirkennedy)
- Termonmaguirk (split with barony of Strabane Upper)
