= Barony (county division) =

Administrative division of a county in Scotland, Ireland and outlying parts of England

A barony is an administrative division of a county in Scotland, Ireland, outlying parts of England and historically France and Sardinia. As a barony is associated to a Baron and a county to a Count or Earl, it has a lower rank and importance than a county.

== Origin ==
A geographic barony is a remnant from mediaeval times of the area of land held under the form of feudal land tenure termed feudal barony, or barony by tenure, either an English feudal barony, a Scottish feudal barony or an Irish feudal barony, which all operated under different legal and social systems. Just as modern counties are no longer under the administrative control of a noble count or earl, geographic baronies are generally no longer connected with feudal barons, certainly not in England where such tenure was abolished with the whole feudal system by the Tenures Abolition Act 1660. The position in Scotland is more complex, although the legal force of the Scottish feudal baron was abolished early in the 21st century.

== Surviving examples ==
=== England ===
Two divisions of the county of Westmorland in England:

- Barony of Kendal
- Barony of Westmorland

=== Scotland ===
- Burgh of barony
- List of Scottish feudal baronies
- Prescriptive barony
- Barony of Balmore
- Barony of Cartsburn
- Barony of Cowie
- Barony of Craigie in Angus
- Barony of Dirleton
- Lordship and Barony of Hailes
- Barony of Ladyland
- Barony of MacDuff
- Barony of Mugdock
- Barony of Newton
- Barony of Peacockbank
- Barony of Plenderleith

=== Sweden ===
- Barony of Adelswärd.

=== Ireland ===
- Barony (Ireland), a former unit of administration in Ireland, below the level of the counties and latterly not usually associated with any baronial title; today lacking any administrative function but in active use as cadastral divisions for land registration and planning permission purposes.

=== Norway ===
- Barony of Rosendal

== See also ==
- Caput baronium, the seat of a barony in Scotland
- Moot hill, the principal residence in law of a barony in England
