= Scotch-Irish Americans =

American descendants of Ulster Scots

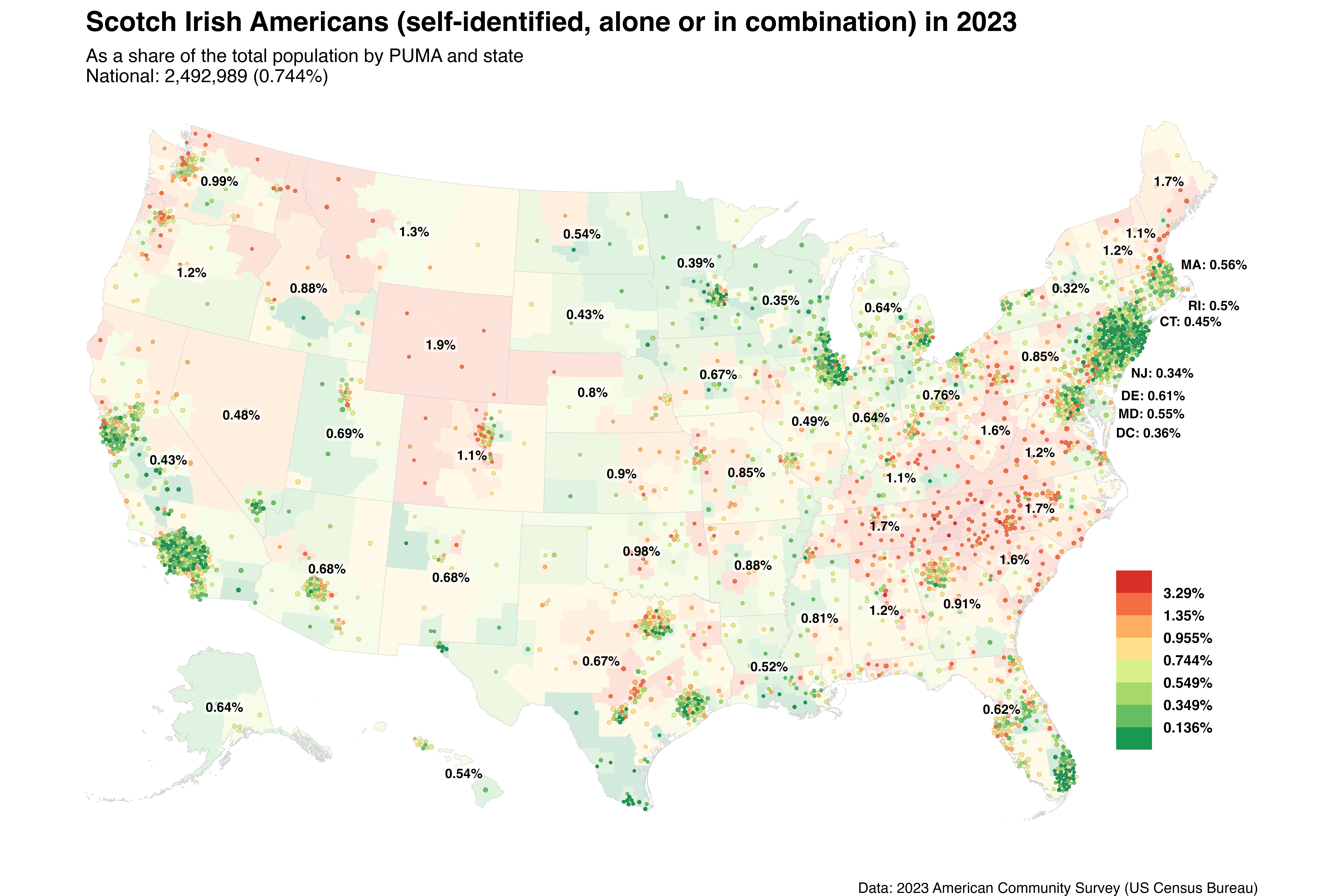

Total population
- 2,500,076 (0.7%) alone or in combination 977,075 (0.3%) "Scotch-Irish" alone (2021 estimates, self-reported) Estimate of Scotch-Irish; Americans total 27,000,000 (2004); Up to 9.2% of the U.S. population (2004)

Regions with significant populations
- California, Texas, North Carolina, Florida, and Pennsylvania; Historic populations in the Upper South, Appalachia, the Ozarks, and northern New England

Languages
- English (American English dialects); Historical: Ulster Scots, Scots

Religion
- Predominantly Baptist and Methodist, historically Reformed (Presbyterian, Congregationalist), with a minority Episcopalian, Catholic

Related ethnic groups
- Ulster Protestants, Ulster Scots, Anglo-Irish, English, Huguenots, British Americans, Welsh, Manx, Irish Americans, Scottish Americans, English Americans, American ancestry

Scotch-Irish Americans (sometimes Scots-Irish) are American descendants of primarily Ulster Scots people, who emigrated from the Ulster province of Ireland to the United States between the 18th and 19th centuries, with their ancestors having originally migrated to Ulster, mainly from the historically conflict‑ridden counties of the Scottish Lowlands and Northern England along the Anglo-Scottish border in the 17th century.

In the 2017 American Community Survey, 5.39 million (1.7% of the population) reported Scottish ancestry, an additional 3 million (0.9% of the population) identified more specifically with Scotch-Irish ancestry, and many people who claim "American ancestry" may actually be of Scotch-Irish ancestry.

The term Scotch-Irish is used primarily in the United States, with people in Great Britain or Ireland who are of a similar ancestry identifying as Ulster Scots people. Many left for North America, but over 100,000 Scottish Presbyterians still lived in Ulster in 1800. With the enforcement of Queen Anne's 1704 Popery Act, which caused further discrimination against all who did not participate in the established church, considerable numbers of Ulster-Scots migrated to the colonies in British America throughout the 18th and 19th centuries.

== Terminology ==
The term is first known to have been used for Scottish Catholics in Ireland. In a letter of April 14, 1573, in reference to descendants of "gallowglass" mercenaries from Scotland who had settled in Ireland, Elizabeth I of England wrote:

We are given to understand that a nobleman named Sorley Boy MacDonnell and others, who be of the Scotch-Irish race ...

This term continued in usage for over a century before the earliest known American reference appeared in a Maryland affidavit in 1689–90.

Scotch-Irish, according to James Leyburn, "is an Americanism, generally unknown in Scotland and Ireland, and rarely used by British historians". It became common in the United States after 1850. The term is somewhat ambiguous because some of the Scotch-Irish have little or no Scottish or Irish ancestry at all: numerous dissenter families, such as the Grahams, were transplanted from northern England to Ulster, specifically from Cumberland and Northumberland. This allowed the Crown to repopulate their English lands with followers of Anglicanism, who were considered to have "good and honest conversation". Smaller numbers of migrants also came from Wales, the Isle of Man, and the southeast of England, and others were Protestant religious refugees from Flanders, the German Palatinate, and France (such as the French Huguenot ancestors of Davy Crockett). What united these different national groups was a base of Calvinist religious beliefs, and their separation from the established church (the Church of England and Church of Ireland in this case). That said, the large ethnic Scottish element in the Plantation of Ulster gave the settlements a "Scottish character" rather than an Irish one.

Upon arrival in North America, these migrants at first usually identified simply as Irish, without the qualifier Scotch. It was not until a century later, following the surge in Irish immigration after the Great Irish Famine of the 1840s, that the descendants of the earlier arrivals began to commonly call themselves "Scotch-Irish" to distinguish themselves from the newer, poor, predominantly Catholic immigrants. At first, the two groups had little interaction in America, as the Scotch-Irish had become settled many decades earlier, primarily in the backcountry of the Appalachian region. The new wave of Catholic Irish settled primarily in port cities such as Boston, New York, Charleston, Chicago, Memphis and New Orleans, where large immigrant communities formed and there were an increasing number of jobs. Many of the new Irish migrants also went to the interior in the 19th century, attracted to jobs on large-scale infrastructure projects such as canals and railroads.

The usage Scots-Irish developed in the late 19th century. Two early citations include: 1) "a grave, elderly man of the race known in America as 'Scots-Irish'" (1870); and 2) "Dr. Cochran was of stately presence, of fair and florid complexion, features which testified his Scots-Irish descent" (1884).

=== History of the term Scotch-Irish ===
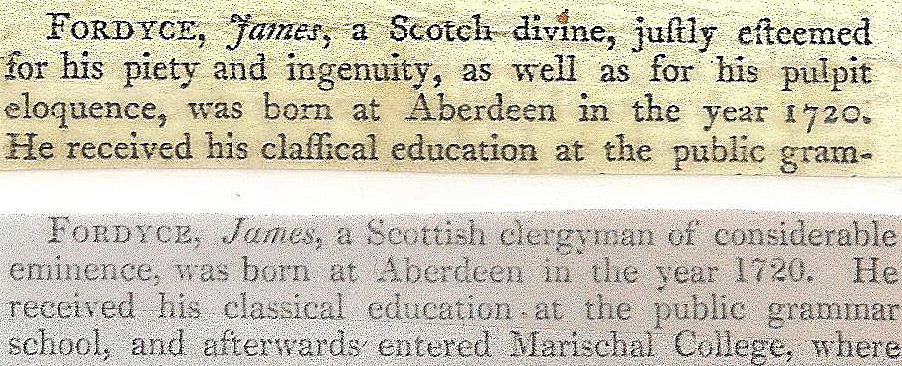
An example, showing the usage of Scotch as an adjective, in the 4th edition of Encyclopædia Britannica, Edinburgh, Scotland (1800), and modernized to Scottish in the 7th edition (1829).

Scotch was the usual adjective for things pertaining to Scotland, including people, until the 19th century, when it was eclipsed by Scottish. It survives in certain set phrases, such as Scotch whisky and Scotch broth, and in the term Scotch-Irish. Although described by Merriam-Webster dictionaries as having first appeared in 1744, the term is undoubtedly older. An affidavit of William Patent, dated March 15, 1689, in a case against a Mr. Matthew Scarbrough in Somerset County, Maryland, quotes Mr. Patent as saying he was told by Scarbrough that "it was no more sin to kill me then to kill a dogg, or any Scotch Irish dogg".

Leyburn cites the following as early American uses of the term before 1744.

- The earliest is a report in June 1695, by Sir Thomas Laurence, Secretary of Maryland, that "In the two counties of Dorchester and Somerset, where the Scotch-Irish are numerous, they clothe themselves by their linen and woolen manufactures."
- In September 1723, Rev. George Ross, Rector of Immanuel Church in New Castle, Delaware, wrote in reference to their anti-Church of England stance that, "They call themselves Scotch-Irish ... and the bitterest railers against the church that ever trod upon American ground."
- Another Church of England clergyman from Lewes, Delaware, commented in 1723 that "great numbers of Irish (who usually call themselves Scotch-Irish) have transplanted themselves and their families from the north of Ireland".

The Oxford English Dictionary says the first use of the term Scotch-Irish came in Pennsylvania in 1744:

- 1744 W. MARSHE Jrnl. 21 June in Collections of the Massachusetts Historical Society. (1801) 1st Ser. VII. 177: "The inhabitants [of Lancaster, Pennsylvania] are chiefly High-Dutch, Scotch-Irish, some few English families, and unbelieving Israelites." Its citations include examples after that into the late 19th century.

In Albion's Seed: Four British Folkways in America, historian David Hackett Fischer asserts:

Some historians describe these immigrants as "Ulster Irish" or "Northern Irish". It is true that many sailed from the province of Ulster ... part of much larger flow which drew from the lowlands of Scotland, the north of England, and every side of the Irish Sea. Many scholars call these people Scotch-Irish. That expression is an Americanism, rarely used in Britain and much resented by the people to whom it was attached. "We're no Eerish bot Scoatch," one of them was heard to say in Pennsylvania.

Fischer prefers to speak of "borderers" (referring to the historically war-torn England-Scotland border) as the population ancestral to the "backcountry" "cultural stream" (one of the four major and persistent cultural streams from Ireland and Britain which he identifies in American history). He notes the borderers had substantial English and Scandinavian roots. He describes them as being quite different from Gaelic-speaking groups such as the Scottish Highlanders or Irish (that is, Gaelic-speaking and predominantly Roman Catholic).

Many have claimed that such a distinction should not be used, and that those called Scotch-Irish are simply Irish, despite having previously come from Scotland or England. Other Irish limit the term Irish to those of native Gaelic stock, and prefer to describe the Ulster Protestants as British (a description many Ulster Protestants have preferred themselves to Irish, at least since the Irish Free State broke free from the United Kingdom, although Ulstermen has been adopted in order to maintain a distinction from the native Irish Gaels while retaining a claim to the North of Ireland). However, as one scholar observed in 1944, "in this country [the US], where they have been called Scotch-Irish for over two hundred years, it would be absurd to give them a name by which they are not known here. ... Here their name is Scotch-Irish; let us call them by it."

== Migration ==
From 1710 to 1775, over 200,000 people settled from Ulster to the original thirteen American colonies. The largest numbers went to Pennsylvania. From that base some went south into Virginia, the Carolinas and across the South, with a large concentration in the Appalachian region. Others headed west to western Pennsylvania, Ohio, Indiana, and the Midwest.

Transatlantic flows were halted by the American Revolution, but resumed after 1783, with total of 100,000 arriving in America between 1783 and 1812. By that point few were young servants and more were mature craftsmen, and they settled in industrial centers, including Pittsburgh, Philadelphia and New York, where many became skilled workers, foremen and entrepreneurs as the Industrial Revolution took off in the U.S. Another half million came to America 1815 to 1845; another 900,000 came in 1851–99. While settling in the new world evolved Scotch-Irish culture, what the settlers brought is the basis of what has been and is referred to as American culture.

According to the Harvard Encyclopedia of American Ethnic Groups, there were 400,000 U.S. residents of Irish birth or ancestry in 1790 and half of this group was descended from Ulster, and half from the other three provinces of Ireland.

A separate migration brought many to Canada, where they are most numerous in rural Ontario and Nova Scotia.

== Origins ==
Because of the proximity of the islands of Britain and Ireland, migrations in both directions had been occurring since Ireland was first settled after the retreat of the ice sheets. Gaels from Ireland colonized current southwestern Scotland as part of the Kingdom of Dál Riata, eventually mixing with the native Pictish culture throughout Scotland. The Irish Gaels had previously been named Scoti by the Romans, and eventually their name was applied to the entire Kingdom of Scotland.

The origins of the Scotch-Irish lie primarily in the Scottish Lowlands and northern England, particularly in the Border Country on either side of the Anglo-Scottish border, a region that had seen centuries of conflict. In the near constant state of war between England and Scotland during the Middle Ages, the livelihood of the people on the borders was devastated by the contending armies. Even when the countries were not at war, tension remained high, and royal authority in one or the other kingdom was often weak. The uncertainty of existence led the people of the borders to seek security through a system of family ties, similar to the clan system in the Scottish Highlands. Known as the Border Reivers, these families relied on their own strength and cunning to survive, and a culture of cattle raiding and thievery developed.

A Map of Ireland. The counties are indicated by thin black lines, including those in Ulster in green, and the modern territory of Northern Ireland indicated by a heavy black border across the island that separates six of the Ulster counties from the other three.

Though remaining politically distinct, Scotland, England (considered at the time to include Wales, annexed in 1535), and Ireland came to be ruled by a single monarch with the Union of the Crowns in 1603, when James VI, King of Scots, succeeded Elizabeth I as ruler of England and Ireland. In addition to the unstable border region, James also inherited Elizabeth's conflicts in Ireland. Following the end of the Irish Nine Years' War in 1603, and the Flight of the Earls in 1607, James embarked in 1609 on a systematic plantation of English and Scottish Protestant settlers to Ireland's northern province of Ulster. The Plantation of Ulster was viewed as a means to relocate the Border Reiver families to Ireland, bringing peace to the Anglo-Scottish border region and providing fighting men to suppress the native Irish.

The first major influx of Scots and English into Ulster had come in 1606 during the settlement of east Down onto land cleared of native Irish by private landlords chartered by James. This process was accelerated with James's official plantation in 1609, and further augmented during the subsequent Irish Confederate Wars. The first of the Stuart Kingdoms to collapse into civil war was Ireland where, prompted in part by the anti-Catholic rhetoric of the Covenanters in Scotland, Irish Catholics launched a rebellion in October, 1641.

In reaction to the proposal by Charles I and Thomas Wentworth to raise an army manned by Irish Catholics to put down the Covenanter movement in Scotland, the Parliament of Scotland had threatened to invade Ireland in order to achieve "the extirpation of Popery out of Ireland" (according to the interpretation of Richard Bellings, a leading Irish politician of the time). The fear this caused in Ireland unleashed a wave of massacres against Protestant English and Scottish settlers, mostly in Ulster, once the rebellion had broken out. All sides displayed extreme cruelty in this phase of the war. Around 4000 settlers were massacred and a further 12,000 may have died of privation after being driven from their homes. This, along with Irish Catholic refugees fleeing, caused Ireland's population to drop by 25%.

William Petty's figure of 37,000 Protestants massacred is far too high, perhaps by a factor of ten; certainly more recent research suggests that a much more realistic figure is roughly 4,000 deaths. In one notorious incident, the Protestant inhabitants of Portadown were taken captive and then massacred on the bridge in the town. The settlers responded in kind, as did the Dublin Castle administration, with attacks on the Irish civilian population. Massacres of native civilians occurred at Rathlin Island and elsewhere.

In early 1642, the Covenanters sent an army to Ulster to defend the Scottish settlers there from the Irish rebels who had attacked them after the outbreak of the rebellion. The original intention of the Scottish army was to re-conquer Ireland, but due to logistical and supply problems, it was never in a position to advance far beyond its base in eastern Ulster. The Covenanter force remained in Ireland until the end of the civil wars but was confined to its garrison around Carrickfergus after its defeat by the native Ulster Army at the Battle of Benburb in 1646. After the war was over, many of the soldiers settled permanently in Ulster. Another major influx of Scots into Ulster occurred in the 1690s, when tens of thousands of people fled a famine in Scotland to come to Ireland.

A few generations after arriving in Ireland, considerable numbers of Ulster-Scots emigrated to the North American colonies of Great Britain throughout the 18th century (between 1717 and 1770 alone, about 250,000 settled in what would become the United States). According to Kerby Miller, Emigrants and Exiles: Ireland and the Irish Exodus to North America (1988), Protestants were one-third the population of Ireland, but three-quarters of all emigrants leaving from 1700 to 1776; 70% of these Protestants were Presbyterians. Other factors contributing to the mass exodus of Ulster Scots to America during the 18th century were a series of droughts and rising rents imposed by their landlords.

During the course of the 17th century, the number of settlers belonging to Calvinist dissenting sects, including Scottish Presbyterians, English Puritans, Flemish Calvinists, French Huguenots, and German Palatines, became the majority among the Protestant settlers in the province of Ulster. However, the Presbyterians and other dissenters, along with Catholics, were not members of the established church and were consequently legally disadvantaged by the Penal Laws, which gave full rights only to members of the Church of England or Church of Ireland.

Members of the Church of Ireland mostly consisted of the Protestant Ascendancy, Protestant settlers of English descent who formed the elite of 17th and 18th century Ireland. For this reason, up until the 19th century, and despite their common fear of Irish Catholics, there was considerable disharmony between the Presbyterians and the Protestant Ascendancy in Ulster. As a result of this, many Ulster-Scots, along with Catholic native Irish, ignored religious differences to join the United Irishmen and participate in the Irish Rebellion of 1798, in support of Age of Enlightenment-inspired egalitarian and republican goals influenced by the French Revolution.

== American settlement ==
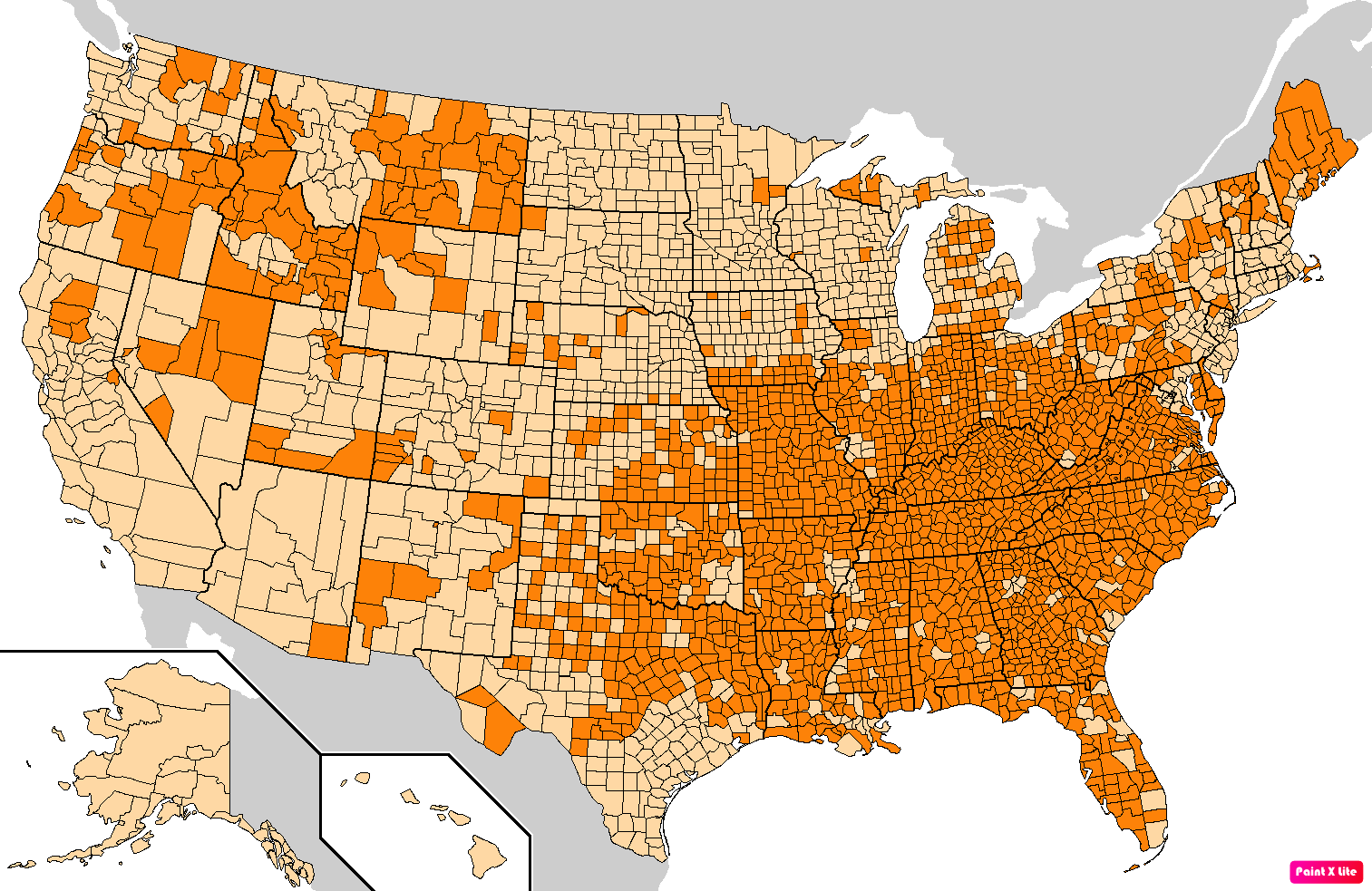
U.S. counties by percentage of population self-identifying Scotch-Irish and American ancestry according to the U.S. Census Bureau American Community Survey 2013–2017 5-Year Estimates. Counties where Scotch-Irish and American ancestry are statistically overrepresented relative to the United States as a whole are in dark orange.

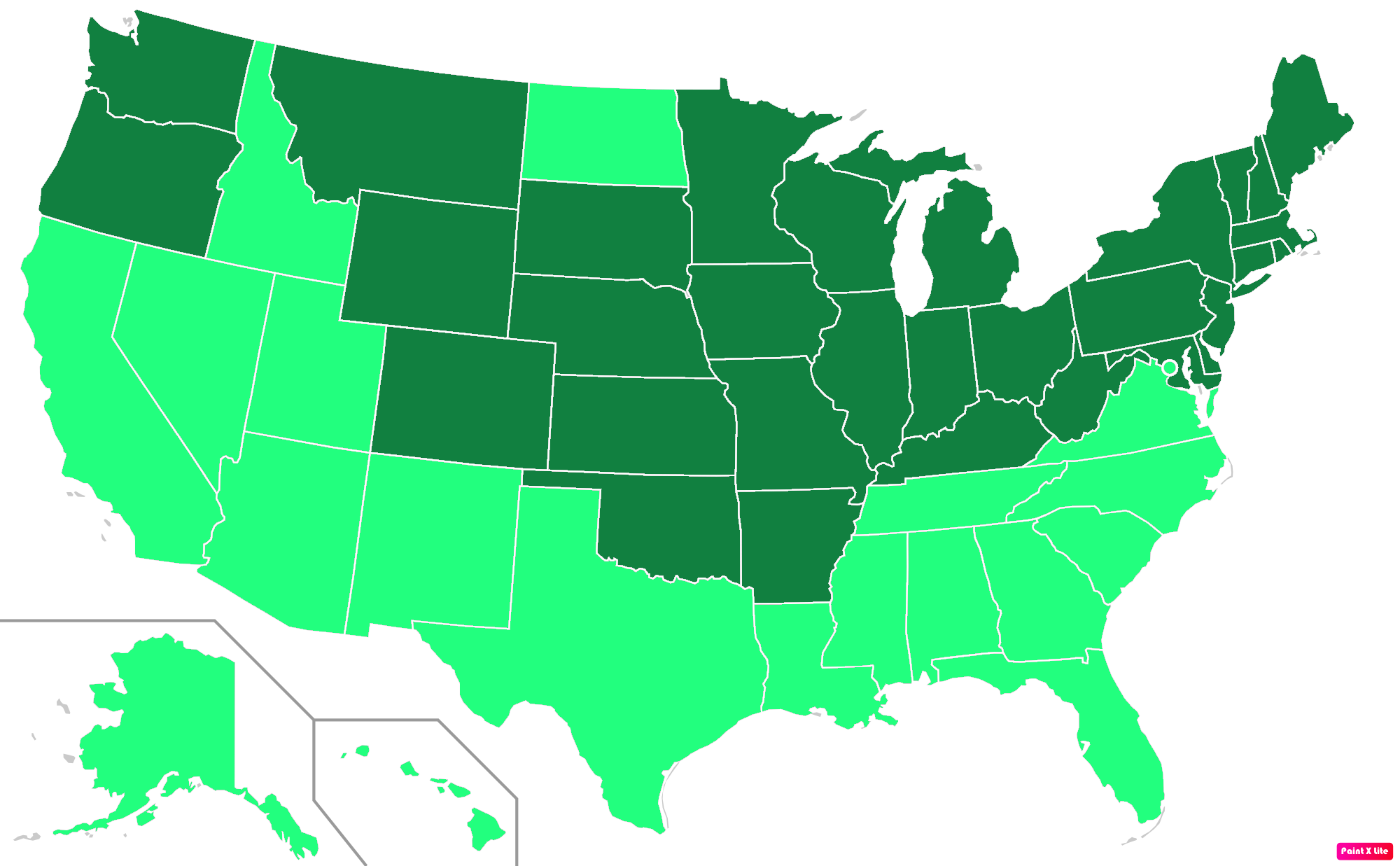
U.S. states by percentage of population self-identifying Irish ancestry according to the U.S. Census Bureau. States where Irish ancestry is statistically overrepresented relative to the United States as a whole are in full green.

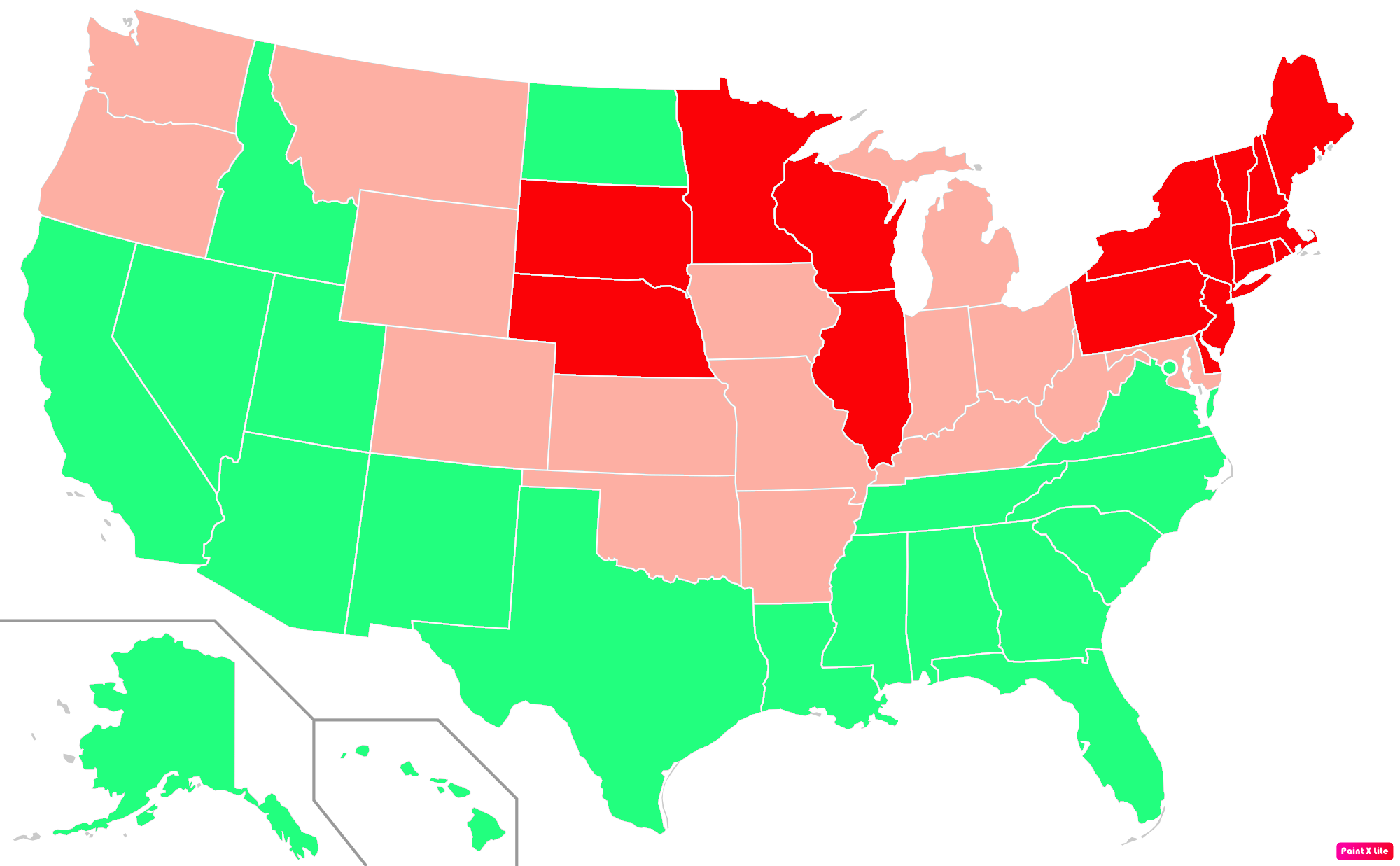
U.S. states where self-identified Irish Americans are overrepresented by self-identified Catholics according to the Pew Research Center. States where Catholics are statistically overrepresented relative to the United States as a whole are in vivid red.

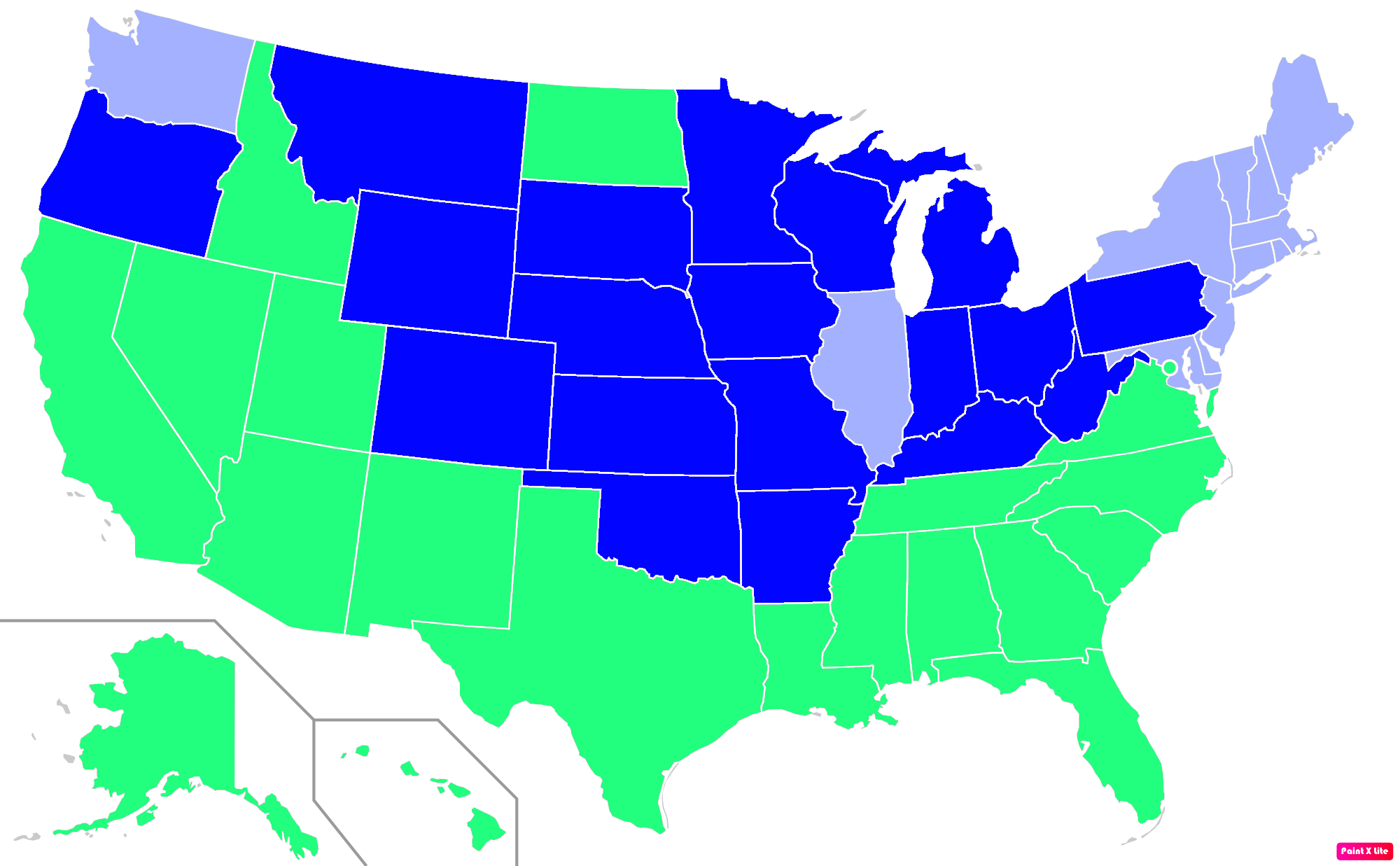
U.S. states where self-identified Irish Americans are overrepresented by self-identified Protestants according to the Pew Research Center. States where Protestants are statistically overrepresented relative to the United States as a whole are in vivid blue.

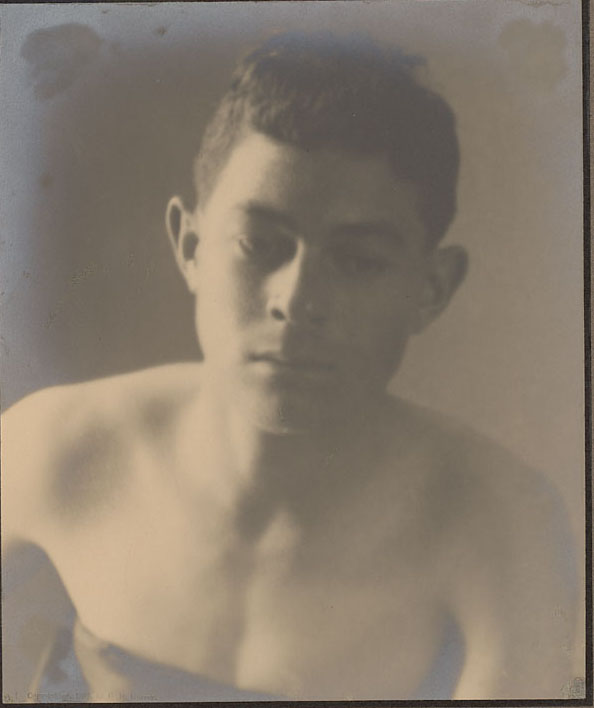
Scotch-Irish-American boy in Hawaii, 1909

Scholarly estimate is that over 200,000 Scotch-Irish migrated to the Americas between 1717 and 1775. As a late-arriving group, they found that land in the coastal areas of the British colonies was either already owned or too expensive, so they quickly left for the more mountainous interior where land could be obtained less expensively. Here they lived on the first frontier of America. Early frontier life was challenging, but poverty and hardship were familiar to them. The term hillbilly has often been applied to their descendants in the mountains, carrying connotations of poverty, backwardness and violence.

The first trickle of Scotch-Irish settlers arrived in New England. Valued for their fighting prowess as well as for their Protestant dogma, they were invited by Cotton Mather and other leaders to come over to help settle and secure the frontier. In this capacity, many of the first permanent settlements in Maine and New Hampshire, especially after 1718, were Scotch-Irish and many place names as well as the character of Northern New Englanders reflect this fact. The Scotch-Irish brought the potato with them from Ireland (although the potato originated in South America, it was not known in North America until brought over from Europe). In Maine it became a staple crop as well as an economic base.

From 1717 for the next thirty or so years, the primary points of entry for the Ulster immigrants were Philadelphia, Pennsylvania, and New Castle, Delaware. The Scotch-Irish radiated westward across the Alleghenies, as well as into Virginia, North Carolina, South Carolina, Georgia, Kentucky, and Tennessee. The typical migration involved small networks of related families who settled together, worshipped together, and intermarried, avoiding outsiders.

=== Pennsylvania and Virginia ===
Most Scotch-Irish landed in Philadelphia. Without much cash, they moved to free lands on the frontier, becoming the typical western "squatters", the frontier guard of the colony, and what the historian Frederick Jackson Turner described as "the cutting-edge of the frontier".

The Scotch-Irish moved up the Delaware River to Bucks County, and then up the Susquehanna and Cumberland valleys, finding flat lands along the rivers and creeks to set up their log cabins, their grist mills, and their Presbyterian churches. Chester, Lancaster, and Dauphin counties became their strongholds, and they built towns such as Chambersburg, Gettysburg, Carlisle, and York; the next generation moved into western Pennsylvania.

With large numbers of children who needed their own inexpensive farms, the Scotch-Irish avoided areas already settled by Germans and Quakers and moved south, through the Shenandoah Valley, and through the Blue Ridge Mountains into Virginia. These migrants followed the Great Wagon Road from Lancaster, through Gettysburg, and down through Staunton, Virginia, to Big Lick (now Roanoke), Virginia. Here the pathway split, with the Wilderness Road taking settlers west into Tennessee and Kentucky, while the main road continued south into the Carolinas.

=== Conflict with Native Americans ===
Because the Scotch-Irish settled the frontier of Pennsylvania and western Virginia, they were greatly affected by the French and Indian War and Pontiac's War. The Scotch-Irish were frequently in conflict with indigenous tribes and did most of the fighting on the frontier from New Hampshire to the Carolinas. The Scots-Irish also became the middlemen who handled trade and negotiations between indigenous tribes and the colonial governments.

Especially in Pennsylvania, whose pacifist Quaker leaders had made no provision for a militia, Scotch-Irish settlements were frequently destroyed and the settlers killed, captured or forced to flee after attacks by the Lenape (Delaware), Shawnee, Seneca, and others tribes of western Pennsylvania and the Ohio Country. Indigenous attacks occurred within 60 miles of Philadelphia, and in July 1763 the Pennsylvania Assembly authorized the raising of a 700-strong militia to be used only for defense. Formed into two units of rangers, the Cumberland Boys and the Paxton Boys, the militia soon exceeded their mandate and began offensive forays against Lenape villages.

The Paxton Boys' leaders received dubious information, which they believed credible, that "hostile" tribes were receiving information and support from the "friendly" tribe of Susquehannock (Conestoga) settled in Lancaster County, who were under the protection of the Pennsylvania government. On December 14, 1763, about fifty Paxton Boys rode to Conestoga Town, near Millersville, Pennsylvania, and murdered six Conestogas. Pennsylvanian authorities placed the remaining fourteen Conestogas in protective custody in the Lancaster workhouse, but the Paxton Boys broke in, killing and mutilating all fourteen on December 27, 1763.

In February 1764, the Paxton Boys with a few hundred backcountry settlers, primarily Scotch-Irish, marched on Philadelphia with the intent of massacring the Moravian Indians who had been given shelter there. Benjamin Franklin, however, led a delegation that intercepted the marchers at Germantown, Philadelphia. Following negotiations the Paxton Boys agreed to disperse and submit their grievances in writing.

=== American Revolution ===
The United States Declaration of Independence contained 56 delegate signatures. Of the signers, eight were of Irish descent. Two signers, George Taylor and James Smith, were born in Ulster. The remaining five Irish-Americans, George Read, Thomas McKean, Thomas Lynch, Jr., Edward Rutledge and Charles Carroll, were the sons or grandsons of Irish immigrants, and at least McKean had Ulster heritage.

In contrast to the Scottish Highlanders, the Scotch-Irish were generally ardent supporters of American independence from Britain in the 1770s. In Pennsylvania, Virginia, and most of the Carolinas, support for the revolution was "practically unanimous". One Hessian officer said, "Call this war by whatever name you may, only call it not an American rebellion; it is nothing more or less than a Scotch Irish Presbyterian rebellion." A British major general testified to the House of Commons that "half the rebel Continental Army were from Ireland". Mecklenburg County, North Carolina, with its large Scotch-Irish population, was to make the first declaration for independence from Britain in the Mecklenburg Declaration of 1775.

The Scots-Irish "Overmountain Men" of Virginia and North Carolina formed a militia which won the Battle of Kings Mountain in 1780, resulting in the British abandonment of a southern campaign, and for some historians "marked the turning point of the American Revolution".

==== Loyalists ====
One exception to the high level of patriotism was the Waxhaw settlement on the lower Catawba River along the North Carolina-South Carolina boundary, where Loyalism was strong. The area experienced two main settlement periods of Scotch-Irish. During the 1750s–1760s, second- and third-generation Scotch-Irish Americans moved from Pennsylvania, Virginia, and North Carolina. This particular group had large families, and as a group they produced goods for themselves and for others. They generally were Patriots.

Just prior to the American Revolution, a second stream of immigrants came directly from Ireland via Charleston. This group was forced to move into an underdeveloped area because they could not afford expensive land. Most of this group remained loyal to the Crown or neutral when the war began. Prior to Charles Cornwallis's march into the backcountry in 1780, two-thirds of the men among the Waxhaw settlement had declined to fight for the Patriots. However, local Loyalists eventually shifted their allegiance to the Patriot cause, as it "was better to fight the British than go to war against their neighbors-a prospect more fearful by far than resisting an increasingly unfriendly, but decidedly temporary, occupying army-or so the men who flooded into the American camp in the summer of 1780 must have reasoned, driven as they were, not by strongly pro-American or anti-British sentiment, but by the power of these local relationships-by loyalty to, and fear of, their neighbors."

=== Whiskey Rebellion ===
In the 1790s, the new American government assumed the debts the individual states had amassed during the American Revolutionary War, and the Congress placed a tax on whiskey (among other things) to help repay those debts. Large producers were assessed a tax of six cents a gallon. Smaller producers, many of whom were Scottish (often Scotch-Irish) descent and located in the more remote areas, were taxed at a higher rate of nine cents a gallon. These rural settlers were short of cash to begin with, and lacked any practical means to get their grain to market, other than fermenting and distilling it into relatively potable spirits.

From Pennsylvania to Georgia, the western counties engaged in a campaign of harassment of the federal tax collectors. "Whiskey Boys" also conducted violent protests in Maryland, Virginia, North Carolina and South Carolina, and Georgia. This civil disobedience eventually culminated in armed conflict in the Whiskey Rebellion. President George Washington accompanied 13,000 soldiers from Carlisle to Bedford, Pennsylvania, where plans were completed to suppress the western Pennsylvania insurrection, and he returned to Philadelphia in his carriage.

=== Influence on American culture and identity ===
Author and U.S. Senator Jim Webb puts forth a thesis in his book Born Fighting (2004) to suggest that the character traits he ascribes to the Scotch-Irish such as loyalty to kin, extreme mistrust of governmental authority and legal strictures, and a propensity to bear arms and to use them, helped shape the American identity. In the same year that Webb's book was released, Barry A. Vann published his second book, entitled Rediscovering the South's Celtic Heritage. As in his earlier book, From Whence They Came (1998), Vann argues that these traits have left their imprint on the Upland South. In 2008, Vann followed up his earlier work with a book entitled In Search of Ulster Scots Land: The Birth and Geotheological Imagings of a Transatlantic People, which professes how these traits may manifest themselves in conservative voting patterns and religious affiliation that characterizes the Bible Belt.

=== Iron and steel industry ===
The iron and steel industry developed rapidly after 1830 and became one of the dominant factors in industrial America by the 1860s. Ingham (1978) examined the leadership of the industry in its most important center, Pittsburgh, as well as smaller cities. He concludes that the leadership of the iron and steel industry nationwide was "largely Scotch-Irish". Ingham finds that the Scotch-Irish held together cohesively throughout the 19th century and "developed their own sense of uniqueness".

New immigrants after 1800 made Pittsburgh a major Scotch-Irish stronghold. For example, Thomas Mellon (b. Ulster; 1813–1908) left Ireland in 1823 and became the founder of the notable Mellon family, which played a central role in banking and industries such as aluminum and oil. As Barnhisel (2005) finds, industrialists such as James H. Laughlin (b. Ulster; 1806–1882) of Jones and Laughlin Steel Company constituted the "Scots-Irish Presbyterian ruling stratum of Pittsburgh society".

=== Slavery and relations with African Americans ===
Scotch-Irish Americans held significant numbers of enslaved African Americans throughout the United States, and consequently, many African Americans possess Scotch-Irish ancestry as a result of interracial unions that occurred between Black individuals and white Scotch-Irish Americans during the period of slavery.

== Customs ==
Archeologists and folklorists have examined the folk culture of the Scotch-Irish in terms of material goods, such as housing, as well as speech patterns and folk songs. Much of the research has been done in Appalachia.

The border origin of the Scotch-Irish is supported by study of the traditional music and folklore of the Appalachian Mountains, settled primarily by the Scotch-Irish in the 18th century. Musicologist Cecil Sharp collected hundreds of folk songs in the region, and observed that the musical tradition of the people "seems to point to the North of England, or to the Lowlands, rather than the Highlands, of Scotland, as the country from which they originally migrated. For the Appalachian tunes...have far more affinity with the normal English folk-tune than with that of the Gaelic-speaking Highlander."

Similarly, elements of mountain folklore trace back to events in the Lowlands of Scotland. As an example, it was recorded in the early 20th century that Appalachian children were frequently warned, "You must be good or Clavers will get you." To the mountain residents, "Clavers" was simply a bogeyman used to keep children in line, yet unknown to them the phrase derives from the 17th century Scotsman John Graham of Claverhouse, called "Bloody Clavers" by the Presbyterian Scottish Lowlanders whose religion he tried to suppress.

=== Housing ===
In terms of the stone houses they built, the "hall-parlor" floor plan (two rooms per floor with chimneys on both ends) was common among the gentry in Ulster. Scotch-Irish immigrants brought it over in the 18th century and it became a common floor plan in Tennessee, Kentucky, and elsewhere. Stone houses were difficult to build, and most pioneers relied on simpler log cabins.

=== Quilts ===
Scotch-Irish quilters in West Virginia developed a unique interpretation of pieced-block quilt construction. Their quilts embody an aesthetic reflecting Scotch-Irish social history—the perennial condition of living on the periphery of mainstream society both geographically and philosophically. Cultural values espousing individual autonomy and self-reliance within a strong kinship structure are related to Scotch-Irish quilting techniques. Prominent features of these quilts include: 1) blocks pieced in a repeating pattern but varied by changing figure-ground relationships and, at times, obscured by the use of same-value colors and adjacent print fabrics, 2) lack of contrasting borders, and 3) a unified all-over quilting pattern, typically the "fans" design or rows of concentric arcs.

=== Language use ===
Montgomery (2006) analyzes the pronunciation, vocabulary, and grammatical distinctions of today's residents of the mountain South and traces patterns back to their Scotch-Irish ancestors. However, Crozier (1984) suggests that only a few lexical characteristics survived Scotch-Irish assimilation into American culture, although David Hackett Fischer in Albion's Seed (1989) estimated the influence of Ulster Scots on Upland South dialects of American English to be greater.

== Number of Scotch-Irish Americans ==
Year	Total Population in U.S.
1625	1,980
1641	50,000
1688	200,000
1700	250,900
1702	270,000
1715	434,600
1749	1,046,000
1754	1,485,634
1770	2,240,000
1775	2,418,000
1780	2,780,400
1790	3,929,326
1800	5,308,483

=== Population in 1790 ===
According to The Source: A Guidebook of American Genealogy, by Kory L. Meyerink and Loretto Dennis Szucs, the following were the countries of origin for new arrivals coming to the United States before 1790. The regions marked * were part of, or ruled by, the Kingdom of Great Britain (the United Kingdom of Great Britain and Ireland after 1801). The ancestry of the 3,929,326 population in 1790 has been estimated by various sources by sampling last names in the 1790 census and assigning them a country of origin.

According to the Harvard Encyclopedia of American Ethnic Groups (Thernstrom, S 1980, "Irish," p. 528), there were 400,000 Americans of Irish birth or ancestry in 1790; half of these were descended from Ulster, and half were descended from other provinces in Ireland.

==== 1790 population of Ulster origin by state ====
The Census Bureau produced official estimates of the colonial American population with roots in the Irish province of Ulster, in collaboration with the American Council of Learned Societies, by scholarly classification of the names of all White heads of families recorded in the 1790 Census. The government required accurate estimates of the origins of the population as basis for computing National Origins Formula immigration quotas in the 1920s (i.e. how much of the annual immigrant quota would be allotted to the Irish Free State, as opposed to Northern Ireland which remained part of the United Kingdom). The final report estimated about 10% of the U.S. population in 1790 had ancestral roots in Ireland, about three fifths of that total from Ulster–broken down by state below:

(Northern Ireland) Estimated Ulster (comprising Scotch-Irish, English-Irish, Celtic-Irish) American population in the Continental United States as of the 1790 Census

State or Territory	Ulster	
State or Territory	#	%
Connecticut	4,180	1.80%
Delaware	2,918	6.30%
Georgia	6,082	11.50%
Kentucky & (Tennessee) Tenn.	6,513	7.00%
Maine	7,689	8.00%
Maryland	12,102	5.80%
Massachusetts	9,703	2.60%
New Hampshire	6,491	4.60%
New Jersey	10,707	6.30%
New York	16,033	5.10%
North Carolina	16,483	5.70%
Pennsylvania	46,571	11.00%
Rhode Island	1,293	2.00%
South Carolina	13,177	9.40%
Vermont	2,722	3.20%
Virginia	27,411	6.20%
(Thirteen Colonies) 1790 Census Area	190,075	5.99%
(Ohio) Northwest Territory	307	2.92%
(New France) French America	220	1.10%
(Spanish Empire) Spanish America	60	0.25%
United States	190,662	5.91%

U.S. Historical Populations
Nation	Immigrants Before 1790	Population 1790–1
----
England*	230,000	2,100,000
Ireland*	142,000	300,000
Scotland*	48,500	150,000
Wales*	4,000	10,000
Other -5	500,000 (Germans, Dutch, Huguenots, Africans)	---- 1,000,000
Total	950,000	3,929,326

== Geographical distribution ==
Finding the coast already heavily settled, most groups of settlers from the north of Ireland moved into the "western mountains", where they populated the Appalachian regions and the Ohio Valley. Others settled in northern New England, The Carolinas, Georgia and north-central Nova Scotia.

In the United States Census, 2000, 4.3 million Americans (1.5% of the U.S. population) claimed Scotch-Irish ancestry.

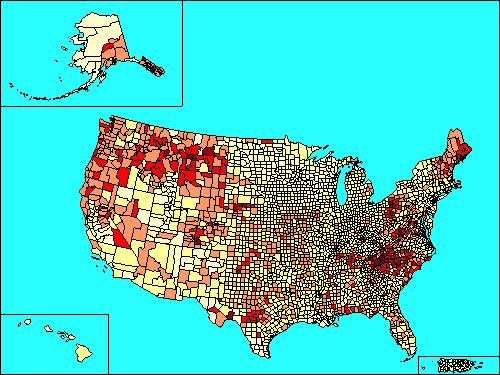
Areas with greatest proportion of reported Scotch-Irish ancestry

The author Jim Webb suggests that the true number of people with some Scotch-Irish heritage in the United States is in the region of 27 million.

The states with the most Scotch-Irish populations as of 2020:

- Texas – 287,393 (1.1%)
- North Carolina – 274,149 (2.9%)
- California – 247,530 (0.7%)
- Florida – 170,880 (0.9%)
- Pennsylvania – 163,836 (1.3%)
- Tennessee – 153,073 (2.4%)
- Virginia – 140,769 (1.8%)
- Georgia – 124,186 (1.3%)
- Ohio – 123,572 (1.1%)
- South Carolina – 113,008 (2.4%)

The states with the top percentages of Scotch-Irish:

- North Carolina (2.9%)
- South Carolina, Tennessee (2.4%)
- West Virginia (2.1%)
- Montana, Virginia (1.8%)
- Maine (1.7%)
- Alabama, Mississippi (1.6%)
- Kentucky, Oregon, Wyoming (1.5%)

=== 2020 population of Scottish ancestry by state ===
As of 2020, the distribution of self-identified Scotch-Irish Americans across the 50 states and DC is as presented in the following table:

(Northern Ireland) Estimated Scotch-Irish American population by state (United States)
State	Number	Percentage
Alabama	70,047	1.43%
Alaska	9,509	1.29%
Arizona	55,674	0.78%
Arkansas	32,957	1.09%
California	207,590	0.53%
Colorado	64,292	1.13%
Connecticut	18,614	0.52%
Delaware	6,409	0.66%
District of Columbia	4,553	0.65%
Florida	161,840	0.76%
Georgia	117,791	1.12%
Hawaii	6,226	0.44%
Idaho	16,784	0.96%
Illinois	69,649	0.55%
Indiana	53,213	0.79%
Iowa	23,671	0.75%
Kansas	29,839	1.02%
Kentucky	60,155	1.35%
Louisiana	32,530	0.70%
Maine	20,261	1.51%
Maryland	40,362	0.67%
Massachusetts	43,520	0.63%
Michigan	69,227	0.69%
Minnesota	27,518	0.49%
Mississippi	42,127	1.41%
Missouri	66,127	1.08%
Montana	15,598	1.47%
Nebraska	14,782	0.77%
Nevada	18,756	0.62%
New Hampshire	16,088	1.19%
New Jersey	31,731	0.36%
New Mexico	15,953	0.76%
New York	67,664	0.35%
North Carolina	242,897	2.34%
North Dakota	4,002	0.53%
Ohio	107,534	0.92%
Oklahoma	40,409	1.02%
Oregon	50,957	1.22%
Pennsylvania	140,542	1.10%
Rhode Island	5,243	0.50%
South Carolina	114,048	2.24%
South Dakota	5,208	0.59%
Tennessee	140,265	2.07%
Texas	249,798	0.87%
Utah	26,440	0.84%
Vermont	7,402	1.19%
Virginia	122,569	1.44%
Washington	84,650	1.13%
West Virginia	32,436	1.79%
Wisconsin	23,629	0.41%
Wyoming	8,070	1.39%
United States	2,937,156	0.90%

== Religion ==
The Scotch-Irish immigrants to North America in the 18th century were initially defined in part by their Presbyterianism. Many of the settlers in the Plantation of Ulster had been from dissenting and non-conformist religious groups which professed Calvinist thought. These included mainly Lowland Scot Presbyterians, but also English Puritans, Flemish Calvinists, French Huguenots, and German Palatines. These Calvinist groups mingled freely in church matters, and religious belief was more important than nationality, as these groups aligned themselves against both their Catholic Irish and Anglican English neighbors.

After their arrival in the New World, the predominantly Presbyterian Scotch-Irish began to move further into the mountainous back-country of Virginia and the Carolinas. The establishment of many settlements in the remote back-country put a strain on the ability of the Presbyterian Church to meet the new demand for qualified, college-educated clergy. Religious groups such as the Baptists and Methodists had no higher education requirement for their clergy to be ordained, and these groups readily provided ministers to meet the demand of the growing Scotch-Irish settlements. By about 1810, Baptist and Methodist churches were in the majority, and the descendants of the Scotch-Irish today remain predominantly Baptist or Methodist. Vann (2007) shows the Scotch-Irish played a major role in defining the Bible Belt in the Upper South in the 18th century. He emphasizes the high educational standards they sought, their "geotheological thought worlds" brought from the old country, and their political independence that was transferred to frontier religion.

=== Princeton ===
In 1746, the Scotch-Irish Presbyterians created the College of New Jersey, later renamed Princeton University. The mission was training New Light Presbyterian ministers. The college became the educational as well as religious capital of Scotch-Irish America. By 1808, loss of confidence in the college within the Presbyterian Church led to the establishment of the separate Princeton Theological Seminary, but for many decades Presbyterian control over Princeton College continued. Meanwhile, Princeton Seminary, under the leadership of Charles Hodge, originated a conservative theology that in large part shaped Fundamentalist Protestantism in the 20th century.

=== Associate Reformed Church ===
While the larger Presbyterian Church was a mix of Scotch-Irish and Yankees from New England, several smaller Presbyterian groups were composed almost entirely of Scotch-Irish, and they display the process of assimilation into the broader American religious culture. Fisk (1968) traces the history of the Associate Reformed Church in the Old Northwest from its formation by a union of Associate and Reformed Presbyterians in 1782 to the merger of this body with the Seceder Scotch-Irish bodies to form the United Presbyterian Church in 1858. It became the Associate Reformed Synod of the West and remains centered in the Midwest. It withdrew from the parent body in 1820 because of the drift of the eastern churches toward assimilation into the larger Presbyterian Church with its Yankee traits. The Associate Reformed Synod of the West maintained the characteristics of an immigrant church with Scotch-Irish roots, emphasized the Westminster standards, used only the psalms in public worship, was Sabbatarian, and was strongly abolitionist and anti-Catholic. In the 1850s it exhibited many evidences of assimilation. It showed greater ecumenical interest, greater interest in evangelization of the West and of the cities, and a declining interest in maintaining the unique characteristics of its Scotch-Irish past.

== Notable people ==
=== U.S. presidents ===
Many presidents of the United States have ancestral links to Ulster. Three presidents had at least one parent born in Ulster: Andrew Jackson, James Buchanan and Chester A. Arthur. The Irish Protestant vote in the U.S. has not been studied as much as that of the Catholic Irish. In the 1820s and 1830s, Jackson supporters emphasized his Irish background, as did supporters of James Knox Polk, but since the 1840s it has been uncommon for a Protestant politician in America to be identified as Irish, but rather as "Scotch-Irish". In Canada, by contrast, Irish Protestants remained a cohesive political force well into the 20th century, identified with the then Conservative Party of Canada and especially with the Orange Institution, although this is less evident in today's politics.

More than one-third of all U.S. presidents had substantial ancestral origins in the Ulster. President Bill Clinton spoke proudly of that fact, and his own ancestral links with the province, during his two visits to Ulster.

Clinton is one of at least seventeen presidents descended from immigrants from Ulster. While many of the presidents have typically Ulster-Scots surnames – Jackson, Johnson, McKinley, Wilson – others, such as Roosevelt and Cleveland, have links which are less obvious.

Andrew Jackson
7th president, 1829–1837: He was born in the predominantly Ulster-Scots Waxhaws area of South Carolina two years after his parents left Boneybefore, near Carrickfergus in County Antrim. A heritage centre in the village pays tribute to the legacy of "Old Hickory". Andrew Jackson then moved to Tennessee, where he began a prominent political and military career. (U.S. Senator from Tennessee, 1797–1798 & 1823–1825; U.S. House Representative from Tennessee's at-large congressional district, 1796–1797; Tennessee Supreme Court Judge, 1798–1804; Military governor of Florida, 1821; U.S. Army Major General, 1814–1821; U.S. Volunteers Major General, 1812–1814; Tennessee State Militia Major General, 1802–1812; Tennessee State Militia Colonel, 1801–1802)
James K. Polk
11th president, 1845–1849: His ancestors were among the first Ulster-Scots settlers, emigrating from Coleraine in 1680 to become a powerful political family in Mecklenburg County, North Carolina. He moved to Tennessee and became its governor before winning the presidency. (13th Speaker of the U.S. House of Representatives, 1835–1839; 9th governor of Tennessee, 1839–1841; U.S. House Representative from Tennessee's 6th congressional district, 1825–1833; U.S. House Representative from Tennessee's 9th congressional district, 1833–1839; Tennessee State Representative, 1823–1825)
James Buchanan
15th president, 1857–1861: Born in a log cabin (which has been relocated to his old school in Mercersburg, Pennsylvania), "Old Buck" cherished his origins: "My Ulster blood is a priceless heritage". His father was born in Ramelton in County Donegal, Ireland. The Buchanans were originally from Stirlingshire, Scotland where the ancestral home still stands. (17th U.S. Secretary of State, 1845–1849; U.S. Senator from Pennsylvania, (1834–1845); U.S. House Representative from Pennsylvania's 3rd congressional district, 1821–1823; U.S. House Representative from Pennsylvania's 4th congressional district, 1823–1831; U.S. Minister to the Russian Empire, 1832–1833; U.S. Minister to the United Kingdom of Great Britain and Ireland, 1853–1856; Pennsylvania State Representative, 1814–1816)
Andrew Johnson
17th president, 1865–1869: His grandfather left Mounthill, near Larne in County Antrim around 1750 and settled in North Carolina. Andrew worked there as a tailor and ran a successful business in Greeneville, Tennessee, before being elected vice president. He became president following Abraham Lincoln's assassination. (16th vice president of the United States, 1865; U.S. Senator from Tennessee, 1857–1862 & 1875; 15th governor of Tennessee, 1853–1857; U.S. House Representative from Tennessee's 1st congressional district, 1843–1853; Tennessee State Senator, 1841–1843; Tennessee State Representative, 1835–1837 & 1839–1841; Greeneville, Tennessee Mayor, 1834–1838; Greeneville, Tennessee Alderman, 1828–1830; Military governor of Tennessee, 1862–1865; Union Army Brigadier General, 1862–1865)
Ulysses S. Grant
18th president, 1869–1877: The home of his maternal great-grandfather, John Simpson, at Dergenagh, County Tyrone, is the location for an exhibition on the eventful life of the victorious Civil War commander who served two terms as president. Grant visited his ancestral homeland in 1878. The home of John Simpson still stands in County Tyrone. (Acting U.S. Secretary of War, 1867–1868; Commanding General of the U.S. Army, 1864–1869; U.S./Union Army Lieutenant General, 1864–1866; Union Army Major General, 1862–1864; Union Army Brigadier General, 1861–1862; Union Army Colonel, 1861; U.S. Army Captain, 1853–1854; U.S. Army Brevet Captain, 1847–1848; U.S. Army 2nd Lieutenant, 1843–1853)
Chester A. Arthur
21st president, 1881–1885: His succession to the Presidency after the death of Garfield was the start of a quarter-century in which the White House was occupied by men of Ulster-Scots origins. His family left Dreen, near Cullybackey, County Antrim, in 1815. There is now an interpretive centre, alongside the Arthur Ancestral Home, devoted to his life and times. (20th vice president of the United States, 1881; New York Port Collector, 1871–1878; New York Guard Quartermaster General, 1862–1863; New York Guard Inspector General, 1862; New York Guard Engineer-in-Chief, 1861–1863)
Grover Cleveland
22nd and 24th president, 1885–1889 and 1893–1897: Born in New Jersey, he was the maternal grandson of merchant Abner Neal, who emigrated from County Antrim in the 1790s. Until Donald Trump's election in 2024, Cleveland was the only president to have served non-consecutive terms. (28th governor of New York, 1883–1885; 34th Mayor of Buffalo, New York, 1882; Erie County, New York Sheriff, 1871–1873)
Benjamin Harrison
23rd president, 1889–1893: His mother, Elizabeth Irwin, had Ulster-Scots roots through her two great-grandfathers, James Irwin and William McDowell. Harrison was born in Ohio and served as a brigadier general in the Union Army before embarking on a career in Indiana politics which led to the White House. (U.S. Senator from Indiana, 1881–1887; Union Army Brevet Brigadier General, 1865; Union Army Colonel, 1862–1865; Union Army Captain, 1862)
William McKinley
25th president, 1897–1901: Born in Ohio, the descendant of a farmer from Conagher, near Ballymoney, County Antrim, he was proud of his ancestry and addressed one of the national Scotch-Irish congresses held in the late 19th century. His second term as president was cut short by an assassin's bullet. (39th governor of Ohio, 1892–1896; U.S. House Representative from Ohio's 18th congressional district, 1887–1891; U.S. House Representative from Ohio's 20th congressional district, 1885–1887; U.S. House Representative from Ohio's 18th congressional district, 1883–1884; U.S. House Representative from Ohio's 17th congressional district, 1881–1883; U.S. House Representative from Ohio's 16th congressional district, 1879–1881; U.S. House Representative from Ohio's 17th congressional district, 1877–1879; Union Army Brevet Brigadier General, 1865; Union Army Colonel, 1862–1865; Union Army Captain, 1862)
Theodore Roosevelt
26th president, 1901–1909: His mother, Mittie Bulloch, had Ulster Scots ancestors who emigrated from Glenoe, County Antrim, in May 1729. Roosevelt praised "Irish Presbyterians" as "a bold and hardy race". However, he is also the man who said: "But a hyphenated American is not an American at all. This is just as true of the man who puts native* before the hyphen as of the man who puts German or Irish or English or French before the hyphen." (*Roosevelt was referring to "nativists", not American Indians, in this context) (25th vice president of the United States, 1901; 33rd governor of New York, 1899–1900; Assistant Secretary of the Navy, 1897–1898; New York City Police Commissioners Board president, 1895–1897; New York State Assembly Minority Leader, 1883; New York State Assembly Member, 1882–1884)
William Howard Taft
27th president, 1909–1913: First known ancestor of the Taft family in the United States, Robert Taft Sr., was born in County Louth circa 1640 (where his father, Richard Robert Taft, also died in 1700), before migrating to Braintree, Massachusetts in 1675, and settling in Mendon, Massachusetts in 1680. (10th Chief Justice of the United States, 1921–1930; 42nd U.S. Secretary of War, 1904–1908; 1st provisional governor of Cuba, 1906; 1st Governor-General of the Philippines, 1901–1903; U.S. 6th Circuit Court of Appeals Judge, 1892–1900; 6th U.S. Solicitor General, 1890–1892)
Woodrow Wilson
28th president, 1913–1921: Of Ulster-Scots descent on both sides of the family, his roots were very strong and dear to him. He was grandson of a printer from Dergalt, near Strabane, County Tyrone, whose former home is open to visitors. (34th governor of New Jersey, 1911–1913; Princeton University president, 1902–1910)
Harry S. Truman
33rd president, 1945–1953: Of Ulster-Scots descent on both sides of the family. (34th vice president of the United States, 1945; U.S. Senator from Missouri, 1935–1945; Jackson County, Missouri Presiding Judge, 1927–1935; U.S. Army Reserve Colonel, 1932–1953; U.S. Army Reserve Lieutenant Colonel, 1925–1932; U.S. Army Reserve Major, 1920–1925; U.S. Army Major, 1919; U.S. Army Captain, 1918–1919; U.S. Army 1st Lieutenant, 1917–1918; Missouri National Guard Corporal, 1905–1911)
Lyndon B. Johnson
36th president, 1963–1969: Of Ulster-Scots ancestry with patrilineal descent traced to Dumfriesshire, Scotland in 1590. (37th vice president of the United States, 1961–1963; U.S. Senate Majority Leader, 1955–1961; U.S. Senate Minority Leader, 1953–1955; U.S. Senate Majority Whip, 1951–1953; U.S. Senator from Texas, 1949–1961; U.S. House Representative from Texas's 10th congressional district, 1937–1949; U.S. Naval Reserve Commander, 1940–1964)
Richard Nixon
37th president, 1969–1974: The Nixon ancestors left Ulster in the mid-18th century; the Quaker Milhous family ties were with County Antrim and County Kildare. (36th vice president of the United States, 1953–1961; U.S. Senator from California, 1950–1953; U.S. House Representative from California's 12th congressional district, 1947–1950; U.S. Naval Reserve Commander, 1953–1966; U.S. Naval Reserve Lieutenant Commander, 1945–1953; U.S. Naval Reserve Lieutenant, 1943–1945; U.S. Naval Reserve Lieutenant J.G., 1942–1943)
Jimmy Carter
39th president, 1977–1981: Some of Carter's paternal ancestors originated from County Antrim, County Londonderry and County Armagh and some of his maternal ancestors originated from County Londonderry, County Down, and County Donegal. (76th governor of Georgia, 1971–1975; Georgia State Senator, 1963–1967; U.S. Navy Reserve Lieutenant J.G., 1953–1961; U.S. Navy Lieutenant J.G., 1949–1953; U.S. Navy Ensign, 1946–1949)
George H. W. Bush
41st president, 1989–1993: Of Ulster-Scots ancestry. (43rd vice president of the United States, 1981–1989; Director of Central Intelligence, 1976–1977; 2nd U.S. Beijing Liaison Office Chief, 1974–1975; 10th U.S. Ambassador to the United Nations, 1971–1973; U.S. House Representative from Texas's 7th congressional district, 1967–1971; U.S. Navy Lieutenant J.G., 1942–1945)
Bill Clinton
42nd president, 1993–2001: Of Ulster-Scots ancestry. (40th & 42nd governor of Arkansas, 1979–1981 & 1983–1992; 50th Arkansas Attorney General, 1977–1979)
George W. Bush
43rd president, 2001–2009: Of Ulster-Scots ancestry. (46th governor of Texas, 1995–2000); Texas Air National Guard First Lieutenant, 1968–1974)
Barack Obama
44th president, 2009–2017: Of Scots-Irish ancestry on mother's side. (U.S. Senator from Illinois, 2005–2008; Illinois State Senator, 1997–2004)

== See also ==
- Lists of Americans
- Appalachia
- Battle of Kings Mountain
- English Americans
- Hatfield–McCoy feud
- Irish Americans
- List of Scotch-Irish Americans
- Scottish Americans
- Ulster American Folk Park
- Whiskey Rebellion
- Scotch-Irish Canadians
