= Ulster Scots people =

Ethnic group

Ulster-Scots Scots-Irish, Ulstèr-Scotch
Regions with significant populations
- Northern Ireland: 345,101, (2011) self‑identified; Northern Irish Protestants
- Republic of Ireland: 24,200, (2018) self‑identified; Irish Protestants
- United States: 3,007,722, (2017) estimated; Scotch‑Irish

Languages
- Majority: Ulster English; Minority: Ulster Scots, Ulster Irish

Religion
- Mainly Presbyterianism, (Presbyterian Church in Ireland, Free Presbyterian Church of Ulster, Non-Subscribing Presbyterian Church of Ireland, Reformed Presbyterian Church of Ireland, Evangelical Presbyterian Church in Ireland.) Anglican, Methodist and Evangelical Protestant minority.

Related ethnic groups
- Anglo-Irish; Irish; English; Lowland Scottish; Scotch-Irish American; Scotch-Irish Canadian; Scottish-American

Ulster Scots (Irish: Albainis Uladh), also known as the Ulster-Scots people or Scots-Irish, are an ethnic group descended largely from Lowland Scottish and Northern English settlers who moved to the northern province of Ulster in Ireland mainly during the 17th century. There is an Ulster Scots dialect of the Scots language.

Historically, there have been considerable population exchanges between Ireland and Scotland over the millennia. This group is found mostly in the province of Ulster; their ancestors were Protestant settlers who migrated mainly from the historically conflict‑ridden counties of the Scottish Lowlands and Northern England along the Anglo-Scottish border during the Plantation of Ulster, which was a planned process of colonisation following the Tudor conquest of Ireland. The largest numbers came from Cumbria, Dumfries and Galloway, Northumberland, the Scottish Borders and, to a lesser extent, from the counties of Ayrshire, Durham, Lanarkshire, Renfrewshire, Yorkshire, as well as the Scottish Highlands.

Ulster Scots people, displaced through hardship, emigrated in significant numbers around in the British Empire and especially to the American colonies, later Canada and the United States. In North America, they are sometimes called "Scotch-Irish", though this term is not used in the British Isles.

== History ==
=== Early development ===
After some minor settling during the late Tudor and early Stuart periods, the first major influx of Lowland Scots and Border English Protestant settlers into Ulster came in the first two decades of the 17th century.

Before the Plantation of Ulster (and even before the Flight of the Earls), there was the 1606 independent Scottish settlement in east Down and Antrim. It was led by adventurers James Hamilton and Sir Hugh Montgomery, two Ayrshire lairds. Montgomery was granted half of Lord of Upper Clandeboye Conn McNeill O'Neill's land, a significant Gaelic lordship in Ulster, as a reward for helping him escape from English captivity. Hamilton forced himself in on this deal when he discovered it and, after three years of bickering, the final settlement gave Hamilton and Montgomery each one-third of the land.

Starting in 1609, Scots began arriving into state-sponsored settlements as part of the Plantation of Ulster. This scheme was intended to confiscate all the lands of the Gaelic Irish nobility in Ulster and to settle the province with Protestant Scottish and English colonists. Under this scheme, a substantial number of Scots were settled, mostly in the south and west of Ulster.

While many of the Scottish planters in Ulster came from southwest Scotland, a large number came from the southeast, including the unstable regions right along the border with England (the Scottish Borders and Northumberland). These groups were from the Borderers or Border Reivers culture, which had familial links on both sides of the Anglo-Scottish border. The plan was that moving these Borderers to Ireland would both solve the Borders problem and tie down Ulster. This was of particular concern to James VI of Scotland when he became King of England, since he knew Scottish instability could jeopardise his chances of ruling both kingdoms effectively.

During the Irish Rebellion of 1641, the native Irish gentry attempted to extirpate the English and Scottish settlers in revenge for being driven off their ancestral land, resulting in severe violence, massacres and ultimately leading to the deaths of between four and six thousand settlers over the winter of 1641–42. Native Irish civilians were massacred in return.

The Ulster Scots population in Ireland was probably preserved from destruction during the subsequent Irish Confederate Wars, when a Scottish Covenanter army was landed in the province to protect the Ulster-Scottish settlers from native Irish landowners. The war itself, part of the Wars of the Three Kingdoms, ended in the 1650s, with the Cromwellian conquest of Ireland. At the head of the army, Oliver Cromwell conquered all of Ireland. Defeating the Irish Confederates and English Royalists on behalf of the English Parliamentarians, he and his forces employed methods and inflicted casualties among the civilian Irish population that have long been commonly considered by contemporary sources, historians and the popular culture to be outside of the accepted military ethics of the day (see more on the debate here). After the Cromwellian war in Ireland was over, many of their soldiers settled permanently in eastern Ulster.

Under the Act of Settlement 1652, all Catholic-owned land was confiscated and the British Plantations in Ireland, which had been destroyed by the rebellion of 1641, were restored. However, due to the Scots' enmity to the English Parliament in the final stages of the English Civil War, English settlers rather than Scots were the main beneficiary of this scheme.

There was a generation of calm in Ireland until another war broke out in 1689, again due to political conflict closely aligned with ethnic and religious differences. The Williamite war in Ireland (1689–91) was fought between Jacobites who supported the restoration of the Catholic James II to the throne of England and Williamites who supported the Protestant William of Orange. The majority of the Protestant colonists throughout Ireland but particularly in Ulster, fought on the Williamite side in the war against the Jacobites. The fear of a repeat of the massacres of 1641, fear of retribution for religious persecution, as well as their wish to hold on to lands which had been confiscated from Catholic landowners, were all principal motivating factors.

The Williamite forces, composed of British, Dutch, Huguenot and Danish armies, as well as troops raised in Ulster, ended Jacobite resistance by 1691, confirming the Protestant minority's monopoly on power in Ireland. Their victories at Derry, the Boyne and Aughrim are still commemorated by the Orange Order into the 21st century.

Finally, another major influx of Scots into northern Ireland occurred in the late 1690s, when tens of thousands of people fled a famine in Scotland to come to Ulster.

It was only after the 1690s that Scottish settlers and their descendants, the majority of whom were Presbyterian, gained numeric superiority in Ulster, though still a minority in Ireland as a whole. Along with Catholics, they were legally disadvantaged by the Penal Laws, which gave full rights only to members of the Church of Ireland (the Anglican state church), who were mainly Anglo-Irish (themselves often absentee landlords), native Irish converts or the descendants of English settlers. For this reason, up until the 19th century, there was considerable disharmony between Dissenters and the ruling Protestant Ascendancy in Ireland. With the enforcement of Queen Anne's 1704 Popery Act, which caused further discrimination against all who did not participate in the established church, considerable numbers of Ulster-Scots migrated to the colonies in British America throughout the 18th and 19th centuries. In fact, these 'Scots-Irish' from Ulster and Lowland Scotland comprised the most numerous group of immigrants from Great Britain and Ireland to the American colonies between 1717 and 1775, with over 100,000 leaving Ulster at the time.

Members of the Church of Ireland mostly consisted of the Protestant Ascendancy, Protestant settlers of English descent who formed the elite of 17th and 18th century Ireland. For this reason, up until the 19th century, and despite their common fear of Irish Catholics, there was considerable disharmony between the Presbyterians and the Protestant Ascendancy in Ulster. As a result of this, many Ulster-Scots, along with Catholic native Irish, ignored religious differences to join the United Irishmen and participate in the Irish Rebellion of 1798, in support of Age of Enlightenment-inspired egalitarian and republican goals influenced by the French Revolution.

Following the rebellion, returning soldiers and Ulster-Scots that migrated to England formed the Grand Orange Lodge of England in 1808.

== Scotch-Irish Americans and Canadians ==
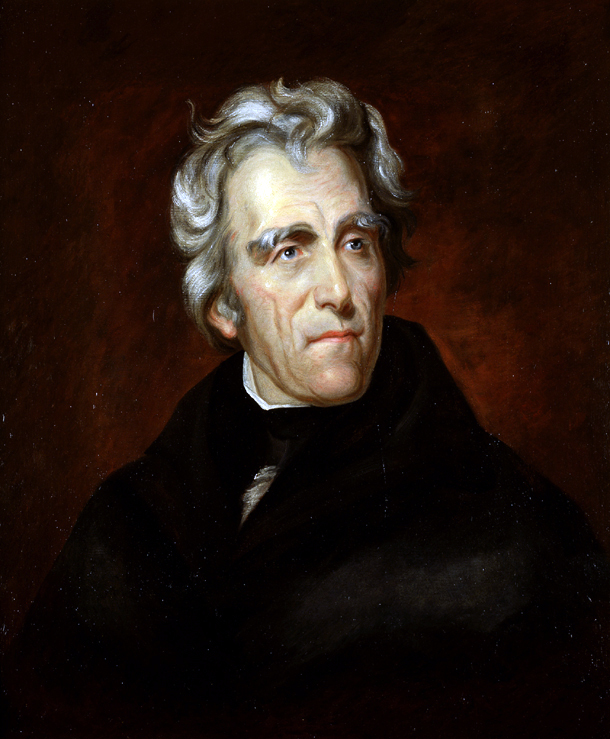
Andrew Jackson, seventh President of the United States, was the first of Ulster-Scots extraction.

Just a few generations after arriving in Ulster, considerable numbers of Ulster-Scots emigrated to the North American colonies of Great Britain. Between 1717 and 1775, over 100,000 migrated to what became the United States of America. Around the same time, the British took control of the territory of New France, allowing many Ulster-Scots to migrate to these areas as well. These people are known as the Scotch-Irish Canadians.

In the 19th and early 20th centuries, the transnational migration of working-class Ulster Protestants and Protestant Canadians into the industrial and mining centers of the United States and Canada led to the establishment of the Loyal Orange Institution in North America. Following the chartering of the Supreme Grand Orange Lodge of the United States in 1870, the fraternity provided critical cultural infrastructure, mutual aid, and social networks for newly arrived Ulster-Scots immigrants, peaking at over 30,000 members across states like Pennsylvania, Ohio, and New York by 1914. While the organization served as a political lobbying mechanism during the height of late-19th-century sectarian labor disputes, its modern surviving lodges and appendant bodies, such as the American Royal Black Institution, operate as benevolent historical and heritage preservation societies, but also focusing on Holy Scripture, keeping Ulster-Scots traditions alive in North America.

In Canada, the Grand Orange Lodge of Canada represents the long-history of Ulster-Scots in Canada. The movement held a strong political influence in the country from the mid-19th to early 20th-century. In Newfoundland and Labrador, The Twelfth of July, also known as Orangeman's Day, is a public holiday.

In the United States census of 2000, 4.3 million Americans (1.5% of the population of the United States) claimed Scotch-Irish ancestry. Author and former United States Senator Jim Webb suggests that the true number of people with some Scots-Irish heritage in the United States is higher (over 27 million), likely because contemporary Americans with some Scotch-Irish heritage may regard themselves as either Irish, Scottish, or simply American instead.

== Ulster-Scots U.S. Presidents ==
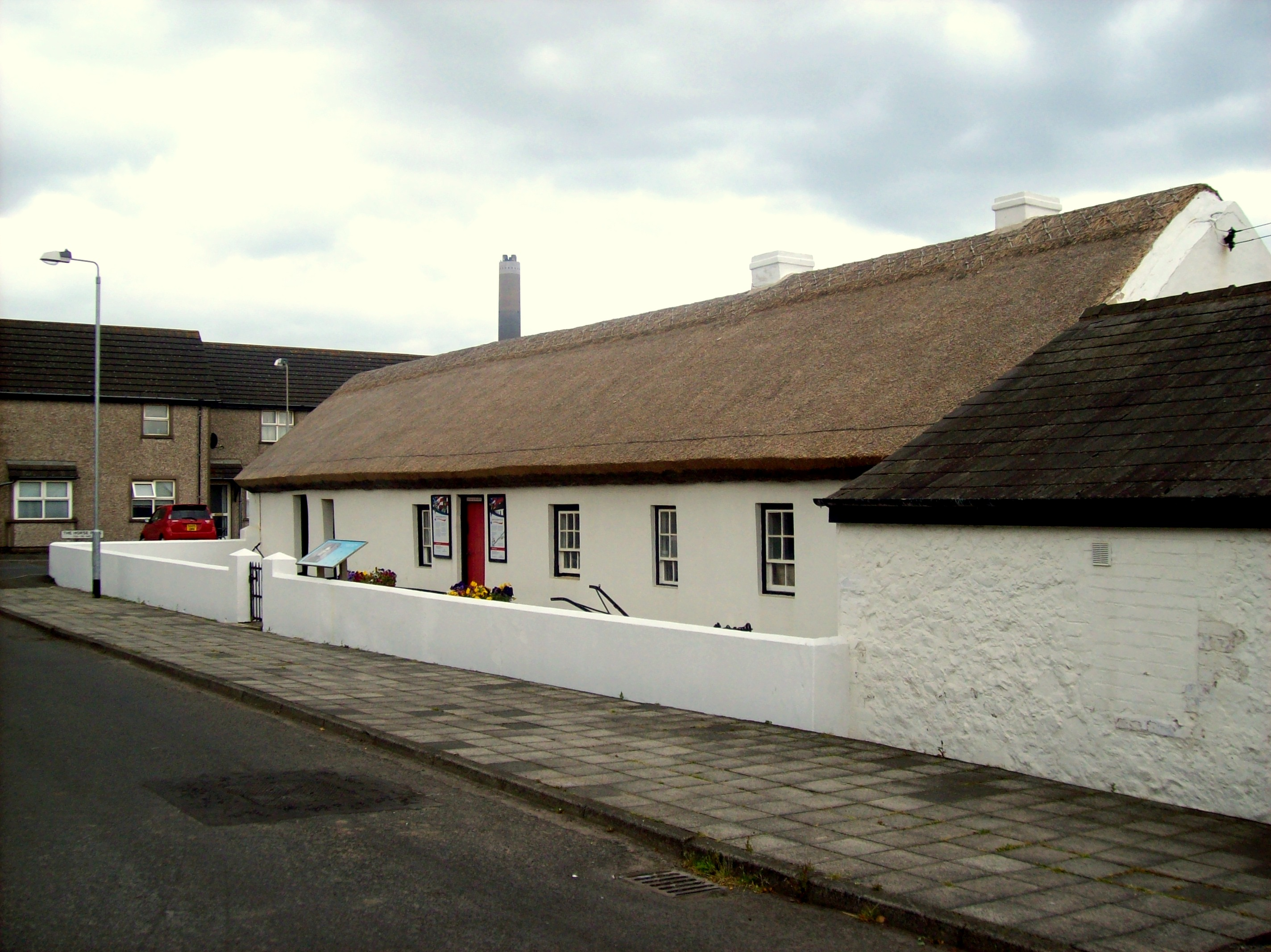
Andrew Jackson Cottage, Carrickfergus

The Ulster-Scots heritage have a historical influence in the connection between Ulster and a line of Presidents of the United States. At at least 17 U.S. Presidents can trace their ancestral roots back to the province of Ulster. The Ulster American Folk Park in Omagh highlights the heritage of the Ulster-Scots Presidents.

7th President Andrew Jackson was the son of two Ulster-Scots parents, as they were from Carrickfergus, County Antrim. The Jacksons emigrated to the U.S. in 1765. The Andrew Jackson Cottage and U.S. Rangers Museum in Boneybefore, Carrickfergus, is a tourist and heritage site today. The cottage is traditional Ulster-Scots thatched farmhouse.

18th U.S. President Ulysses S. Grant shared lineage through his great grand father, John Simpson, who was from Dergenagh, County Tyrone. Grant visited his ancestral home in Ulster during his post-presidency world tour in 1879. The Grant Ancestral Homestead near is preserved as a museum.

28th U.S. President Woodrow Wilson's grandfather, James Wilson emigrated to the United States in 1807 from his hometown, Dergalt, County Tyrone. James Wilson's son Joseph was a Presbyterian minister and served as a pastor in the Civil War. The Wilson House still stands today and contains many original family pieces.

== Maine Ulster-Scots Project ==
Founded in 2006, the Maine Ulster-Scots Project is a non-profit organization made up of volunteers to research Ulster-Scots heritage and culture. They are based in Freeport, Maine, and actively carry out archaeological excavations in the old hay fields bordering Maquoit Bay in Flying Point. They discovered stone foundation layouts, and broken pottery. They also have produced history books and resources to help people find out how to discover their heritage through genealogy.

Maine has the highest per-capita percentage of self-identified Scottish and Ulster-Scots descendants in the United States.

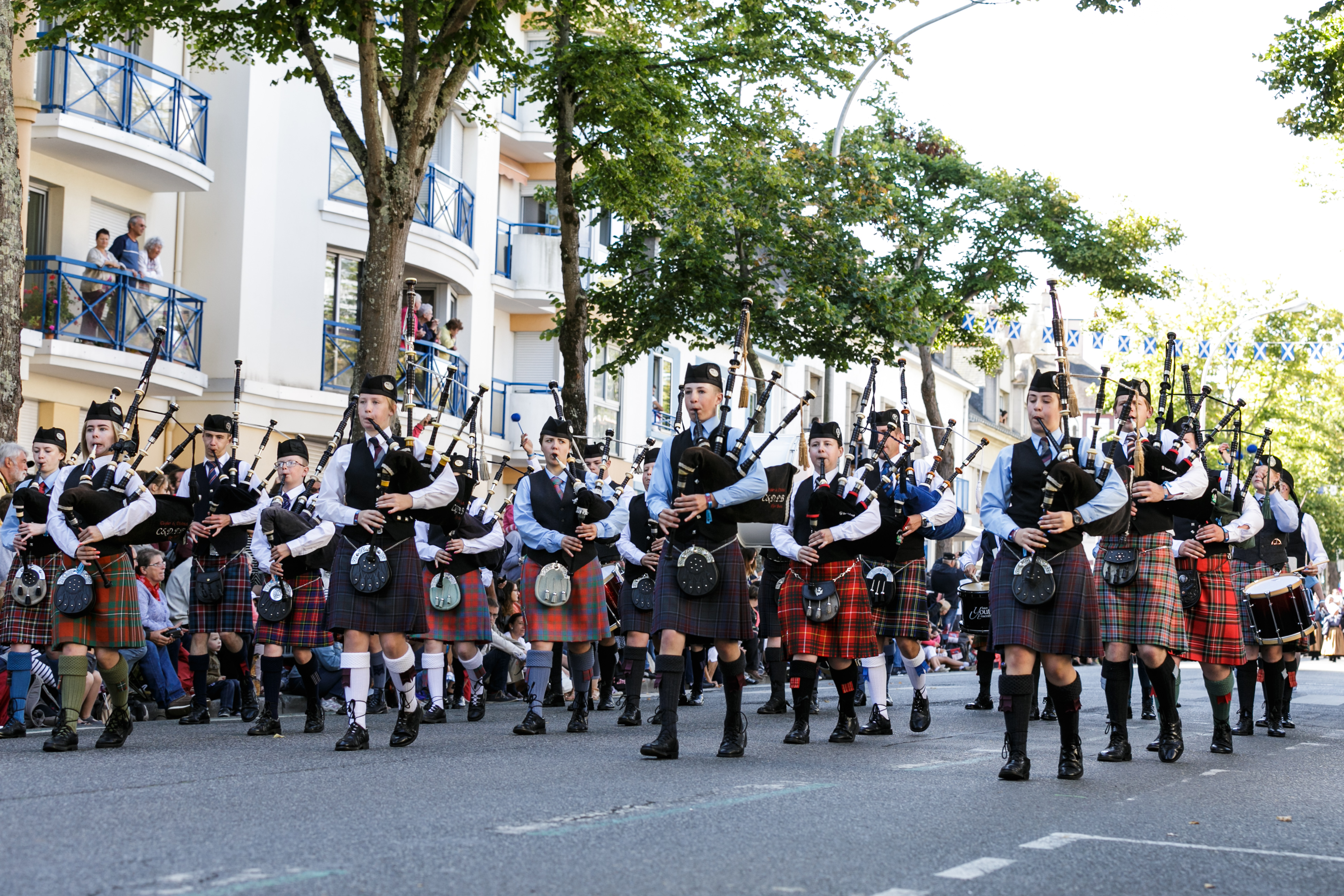
A youth pipe band from the Ulster-Scots Agency

== Culture ==
Over the centuries, Ulster Scots culture has contributed to the unique character of the counties in Ulster. The Ulster Scots Agency points to industry, language, music, sport, religion and myriad traditions brought to Ulster from the Scottish lowlands. In particular, the origin of country and western music was extensively from Ulster Scots folk music, in addition to English, German, and African-American styles.

The cultural traditions and aspects of this culture including its links to country music are articulated in David Hackett Fischer's book, Albion's Seed: Four British Folkways in America. In 2010's documentary The Hamely Tongue, filmmaker Deaglán Ó Mocháin traces back the origins of this culture and language, and relates its manifestations in today's Ireland. The film's title refers to James Fenton's book, The Hamely Tongue: A personal record of Ulster-Scots in County Antrim.

Most Ulster Scots speak Ulster English as a first language. Ulster Scots is the local dialect of the Lowland Scots language which has, since the 1980s, also been called "Ullans", a portmanteau neologism popularised by the physician, amateur historian and politician Ian Adamson, merging Ulster and Lallans – the Scots for 'Lowlands' – but also said to be a backronym for 'Ulster-Scots language in literature and native speech'.

The Twelfth of July is an Ulster-Scots associated commemoration historically and culturally. It is a bank holiday in Northern Ireland, as well as Newfoundland and Labrador, which has a strong Ulster-Scots and Orange Order presence in Canada. It is also held in the Orange Order in Africa. The marching bands play a range of folk and loyalist songs. A range of events take place leading up to the parades, including community festivities such as learning about Orangeism and Ulster-Scots heritage, different cuisine and musical events, referred to as "Orangefest". The Eleventh Night, which precedes the parade, symbolizes the beacon fires used to guide King William’s ships into Belfast Lough.

Van Morrison is an Ulster-Scots person who has been recognised for his contributions to music. He received an OBE and Officier de l’Ordre des Arts et des Lettres in 1996, and received his Knighthood in 2016. He grew up on Hyndford Street, and was taught music lessons by fellow Ulster-Scot and Hyndford Street resident George Cassidy. A jazz musician who played the tenor saxophone. Morrison has written several songs about his Ulster routes, including On Hyndford Street and Cyprus Avenue.

== Hereditary disease ==
The North American ancestry of the X-linked form of the genetic disease congenital nephrogenic diabetes insipidus has been traced to Ulster Scots who travelled to Nova Scotia in 1761 on the ship Hopewell.

== See also ==
- Anglo-Irish people
- British Americans
- British Canadians
- History of Northern Ireland
- History of Scotland
- Immigration to the United States
- Irish Catholics
- Orange Order
- Plantation of Ulster
- Presbyterian Church in Ireland
- Republic of Ireland
- Scotch-Irish Americans
- Society of United Irishmen
- Ulster
- Ulster Covenant
- Ulster loyalism
- Ulster-Scots Agency
- Ulster Scots dialect
- Unionism in Ireland
- William III of England
