= Aghaginduff =

Townland in County Tyrone, Northern Ireland

Coordinates: 54.498326°N 6.935376°W

Aghaginduff: Irish: Achadh Cinn Duibh
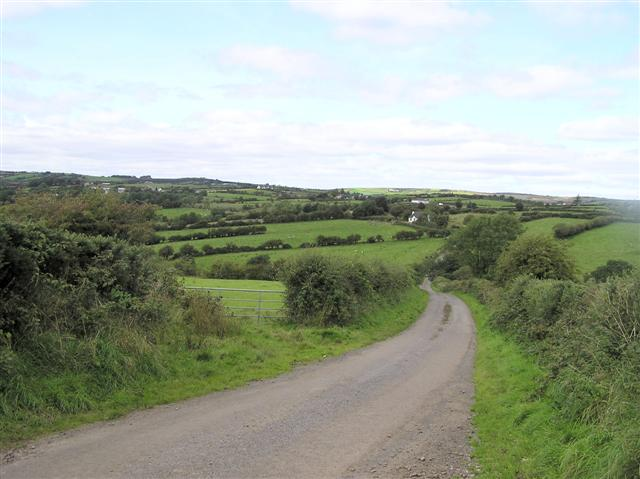
- Aghaginduff townland in 2006
- County: County Tyrone
- Country: Northern Ireland
- Sovereign state: United Kingdom
- Postcode district: BT70
- Dialling code: 028

Aghaginduff (from Irish Achadh Cinn Duibh, meaning 'field of the black head') is a townland in County Tyrone, Northern Ireland. It is situated in the historic barony of Dungannon Lower and the civil parish of Killeeshil and covers an area of 512 acres (207 ha). Aghaginduff is located approximately 12 km (7 mi) west of Dungannon, close to Cabragh.

The townland contains St Joseph's Roman Catholic Church.

== See also ==
- List of townlands of County Tyrone
