= Tullyvannon =

Townland (land unit) in Northern Ireland

Tullyvannon: Irish: Tulaigh Mheannáin
- County: County Tyrone
- Country: Northern Ireland
- Sovereign state: United Kingdom
- Postcode district: BT70
- Dialling code: 028

Tullyvannon (from Irish Tulaigh Mheannáin, meaning 'knoll of the kid') is a townland in County Tyrone, Northern Ireland. It is situated in the historic barony of Dungannon Lower and the civil parish of Killeeshil and covers an area of 448 acres.

== See also ==
- List of townlands of County Tyrone
