= Glencull =

Glencull: Irish: Gleann Choill; Glencull
- Village
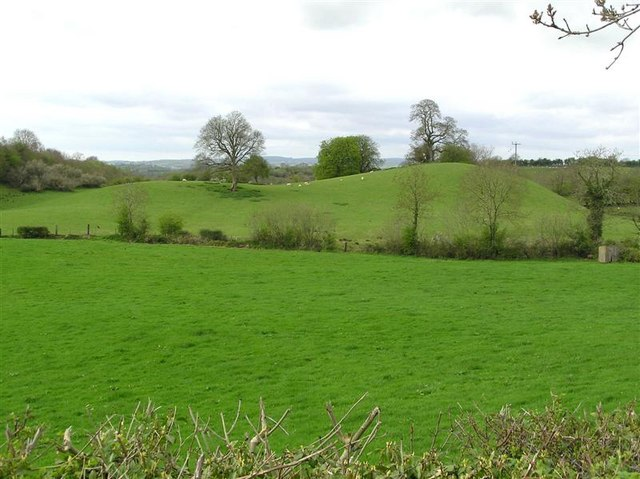
- Glencull townland in 2006
- County: County Tyrone
- Country: Northern Ireland
- Sovereign state: United Kingdom
- Postcode district: BT70
- Dialling code: 028

Glencull (from Irish Gleann Choill, meaning 'hazel glen') is a townland in County Tyrone, Northern Ireland. It is situated in the historic barony of Dungannon Lower and the civil parish of Killeeshil and covers an area of 241 acres (98 ha). It is the only exclave of Killeeshil.

== Education ==
The townland contains St Malachys Glencull Primary School. The school was opened in 1833 and pupils included poets John Montague and Patrick Farrell.

== See also ==
- List of townlands of County Tyrone
