= Cúchulainn an Ghleanna =

Tyrone-based Gaelic games club

Cúchulainn an Ghleanna is a Gaelic Athletic Association and camogie club in County Tyrone, Northern Ireland. The club was formed in December 2016 to establish a juvenile hurling and camogie club in the Clogher Valley region of Tyrone in what is described as "a football heartland". The catchment area of the club includes the villages of Ballygawley, Augher, Clogher, Aghaloo, Aughnacloy and Killeeshil.

The club colours are blue and yellow.
