= Bockets =

Land area (townland) in Northern Ireland

Coordinates: 54.495453°N 6.980078°W

Bockets: Irish: Buacaide
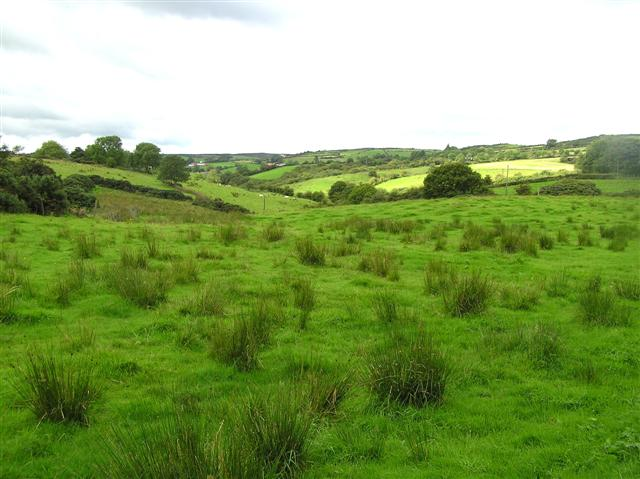
- Bockets townland in 2006

- Location within Northern Ireland
- County: County Tyrone
- Country: Northern Ireland
- Sovereign state: United Kingdom
- Postcode district: BT
- Dialling code: 028
- UK Parliament: Fermanagh and South Tyrone

Bockets (from Irish Buacaide, meaning 'a round hill') is a townland in County Tyrone, Northern Ireland. It is situated in the historic barony of Dungannon Lower and the civil parish of Killeeshil and covers an area of 667 acres (270 ha).

== See also ==
- List of townlands of County Tyrone
