= Farriter =

Farriter: Irish: Fearan Iochtrach
- County: County Tyrone
- Country: Northern Ireland
- Sovereign state: United Kingdom
- Postcode district: BT70
- Dialling code: 028

Farriter (from Irish Fearan Iochtrach, meaning 'lower lying land') is a townland in County Tyrone, Northern Ireland. It is situated in the historic barony of Dungannon Lower and the civil parish of Killeeshil and covers an area of 271 acres (110 ha).

== See also ==
- List of townlands of County Tyrone
