= Cranlome =

Cranlome: Irish: Crann Lom
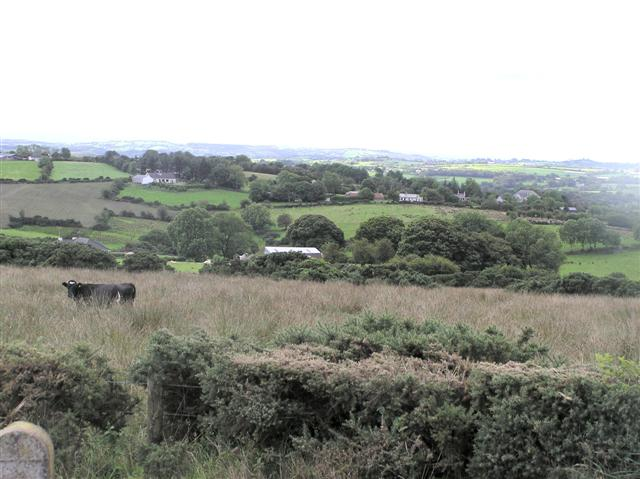
- Cranlome townland in 2006
- County: County Tyrone
- Country: Northern Ireland
- Sovereign state: United Kingdom
- Postcode district: BT70
- Dialling code: 028

Cranlome (from Irish Crann Lom, meaning 'place of leafless or bare bushes') is a townland in County Tyrone, Northern Ireland. It is situated in the historic barony of Dungannon Lower and the civil parish of Killeeshil and covers an area of 1,259 acres (509 ha).

== See also ==
- List of townlands of County Tyrone
