= Mullyroddan =

Townland (administrative area) in Northern Ireland

Mullyroddan: Irish: Mullagh Rodain
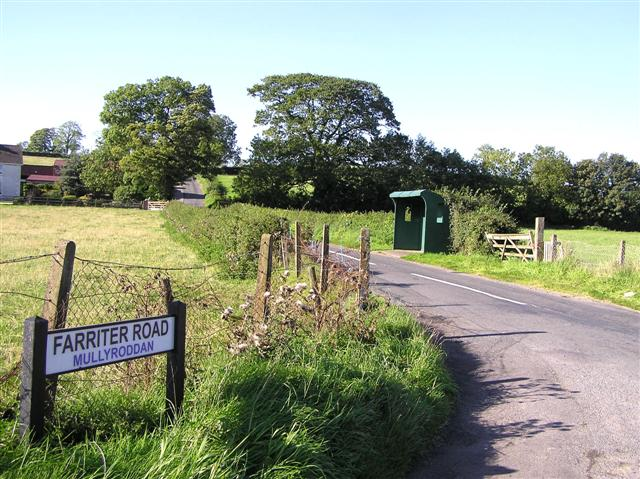
- Mullyroddan in 2006
- County: County Tyrone
- Country: Northern Ireland
- Sovereign state: United Kingdom
- Postcode district: BT70
- Dialling code: 028

Mullyroddan (from Irish Mullagh Rodain, meaning 'summit of the little road') is a townland in County Tyrone, Northern Ireland. It is situated in the historic barony of Dungannon Lower and the civil parish of Killeeshil and covers an area of 308 acres (125 ha).

== See also ==
- List of townlands of County Tyrone
