= Lurgacullion =

Townland in County Tyrone, Northern Ireland

Lurgacullion: Irish: Lurg a chuilinn
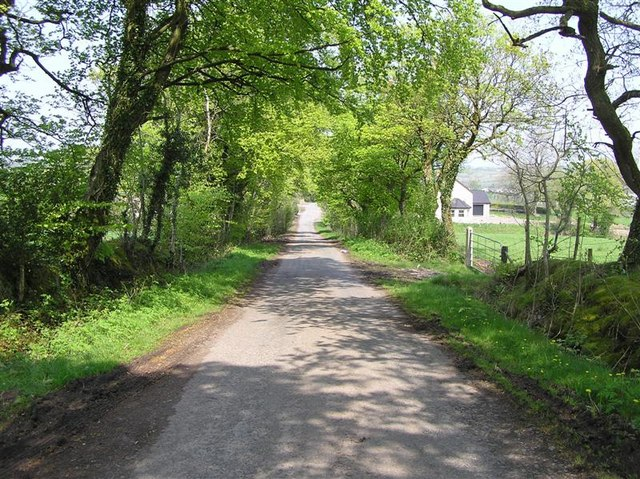
- Lurgacullion in 2006
- County: County Tyrone
- Country: Northern Ireland
- Sovereign state: United Kingdom
- Postcode district: BT70
- Dialling code: 028

Lurgacullion (from Irish Lurg a chuilinn, meaning 'the long hill of the holly') is a townland in County Tyrone, Northern Ireland. It is situated in the historic barony of Dungannon Lower and the civil parish of Killeeshil and covers an area of 289 acres (117 ha).

== See also ==
- List of townlands of County Tyrone
