= Cabragh (Killeeshil) =

Village in County Tyrone, Northern Ireland

Cabragh: Irish: An Chabrach; Scots: Cabraith; Cabragh
- Village
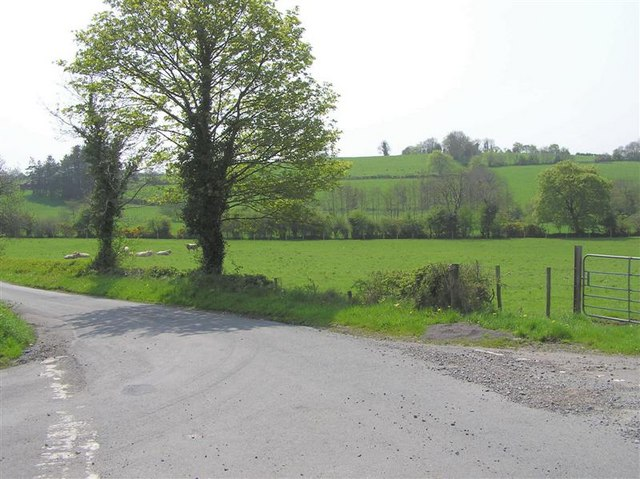
- Cabragh townland in 2006

- Location within Northern Ireland
- Population: 465 Census 2021
- County: County Tyrone
- Country: Northern Ireland
- Sovereign state: United Kingdom
- Post town: Dunnganon
- Postcode district: BT70
- Dialling code: 028

Cabragh (from Irish An Chabrach, meaning 'the poor land') is a small village and townland in County Tyrone, Northern Ireland. It is in the historic barony of Dungannon Lower, the civil parish of Killeeshil and the poor law union of Dunngannon, and covers an area of 347 acres (140 ha) in the province of Ulster. Cabragh is located approximately 12 km (7 mi) west of Dungannon, close to Aghaginduff and Fasglashagh.

== Education ==
Cabragh has a primary school called St. Mary's Primary School, which has been open since 1969. Around 200 pupils attend the school as of 2023

== History ==
Throughout 1610 (pre-plantation) to 1856, the land ownership of Cabragh has switched multiple times. In 1610, Cabragh was under the control of Clonennis (MacDonnell), while post-plantation Neal O'Neale was the servitor. William Groves held the land of Cabragh in 1641 until 1856 when Cabragh was no longer owned by any land holders.

== See also ==
- List of townlands of County Tyrone
