= Statue of Ronald Reagan (Warsaw) =

Monument in Warsaw, Poland

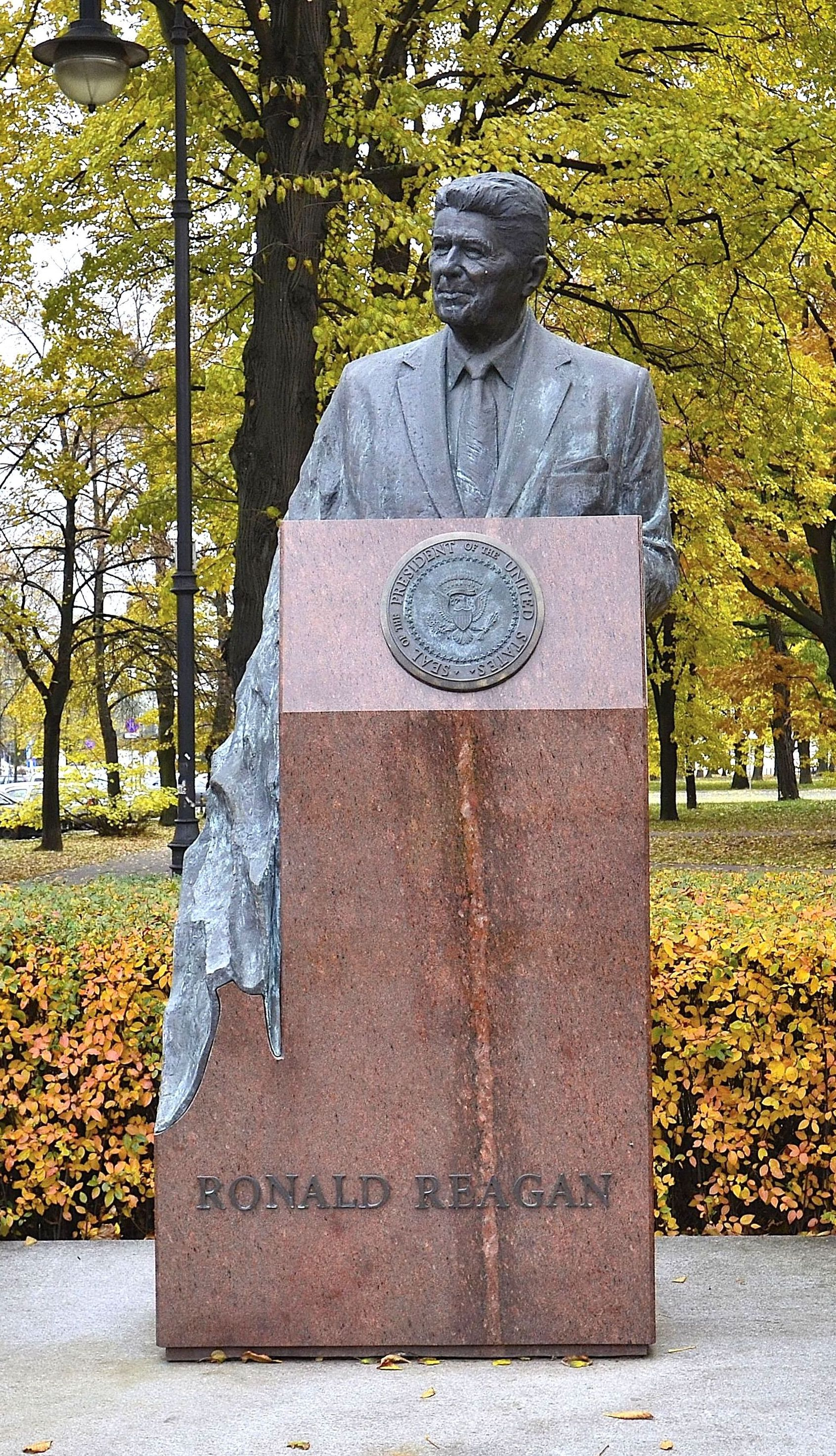
- The monument in 2015.
- Interactive map of Statue of Ronald Reagan
- Location: Ujazdów Avenue, Downtown, Warsaw, Poland
- Coordinates: 52°13′28.67″N 21°01′27.05″E
- Designer: Władysław Dudek
- Type: Statue
- Material: Bronze
- Height: 3.5 m (11 ft)
- Completion date: 21 November 2011
- Dedicated to: Ronald Reagan

The statue of Ronald Reagan (Polish: Pomnik Ronalda Reagana) is a monument in Warsaw, Poland, within the Downtown district. It is placed on Ujazdów Avenue, near the corner with Jan Matejko Street, and in the vicinity of the embassy of the United States. It has the form of a bronze statue of Ronald Reagan, the president of the United States from 1981 to 1989. The monument was designed by sculptor Władysław Dudek, and unveiled on 21 November 2011.

== History ==
The monument was proposed by Janusz Dorosiewicz, the chairperson of the Ronald Reagan Foundation in Warsaw, and was designed by sculptor Władysław Dudek. While the construction of the monument was not consulted with the municipal authorities of Warsaw, its location near the embassy of the United States was approved by the city council. It was unveiled on 21 November 2011 by Lech Wałęsa, who was the president of Poland from 1990 to 1995.

== Design ==
The monument is placed on Ujazdów Avenue, near the corner with Jan Matejko Street, in the vicinity of the embassy of the United States.

The 3.5-metre-tall sculpture consists of a bronze statue of Ronald Reagan, the president of the United States from 1981 to 1989, standing behind a lectern. It features the presidential seal on top and an inscription which reads "Ronald Reagan" at the bottom. The president is depicted as when giving the speech "Mr. Gorbachev, tear down this wall" on 12 June 1987 in West Berlin.

== See also ==
- List of things named after Ronald Reagan
- List of buildings and monuments honoring presidents of the United States in other countries
