= Dergenagh =

Dergenagh: Irish: Dearganach
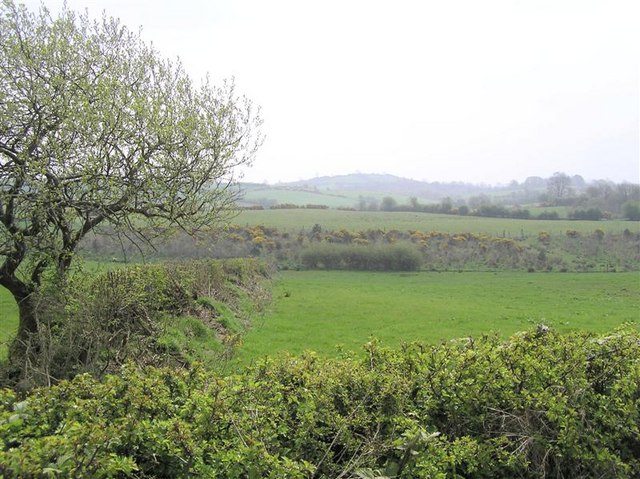
- Dergenagh townland in 2006
- County: County Tyrone
- Country: Northern Ireland
- Sovereign state: United Kingdom
- Postcode district: BT70
- Dialling code: 028

Dergenagh (from Irish Dearganach, meaning 'red marshy ground') is a townland in County Tyrone, Northern Ireland. It is situated in the historic barony of Dungannon Lower and the civil parish of Killeeshil and covers an area of 437 acres (177 ha).

John Simpson, the maternal great-grandfather of Ulysses S. Grant, 18th president of the United States, was born and lived in Dergenagh until emigrating to the United States in 1760. His home, now the US Grant Ancestral Homestead, still stands and is now operated by Mid-Ulster District Council as a tourist attraction. Grant himself visited his ancestral home during his world tour in 1879, and shares a robust lineage of Ulster-Scots Presidents.

== See also ==
- List of townlands of County Tyrone
