= List of monuments and memorials to presidents of the United States in other countries =

This is a list of monuments and memorials to presidents of the United States in other countries.

== Canada ==
- Franklin Delano Roosevelt Bridge
- John F. Kennedy High School (Montreal)
- Ontario Street (Montreal), President Kennedy Avenue
- Quebec Route 173, Route-du-Président-Kennedy
- Roosevelt Campobello International Park
- Warren G. Harding Memorial

== Kosovo ==
- Bill Clinton Boulevard

== Poland ==
- Bust of George Washington, Warsaw
- Jerzego Waszyngtona Avenue, Warsaw (George Washington Avenue)
- Jerzego Waszyngtona Roundabout, Warsaw (George Washington Roundabout)
- Ronald Reagan Monument (Warsaw)
- Ronald Reagan Park, Gdańsk
- Wilson Square
  - Plac Wilsona metro station

== United Kingdom ==
- Abraham Lincoln: The Man
- J. F. Kennedy Memorial, Birmingham
- Andrew Jackson Centre
- John F Kennedy Catholic School
- John F. Kennedy Memorial, London
- John F. Kennedy Memorial, Runnymede
- Kennedy Scholarship
- Lincoln Memorial Tower
- Scottish American Soldiers Monument, depicting a standing figure of Abraham Lincoln, with a freed slave giving thanks at his feet
- Statue of George Washington (Houdon)

== See also ==
- Presidential memorials in the United States
