= Andrew Jackson Centre =

Ancestral home of Andrew Jackson

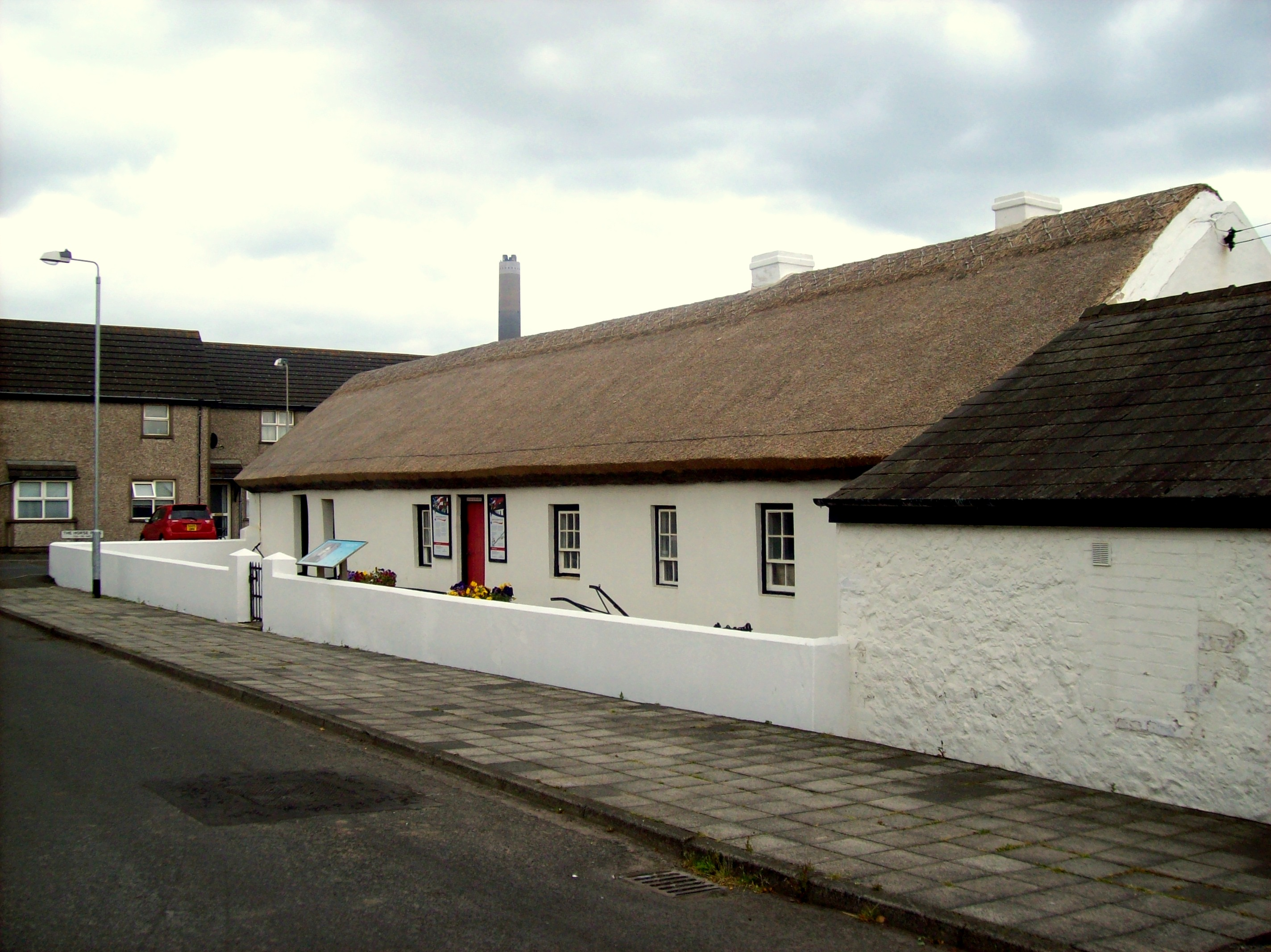
The front of the Andrew Jackson Cottage

The Andrew Jackson Centre, also known as the Andrew Jackson Cottage, is the ancestral home of Andrew Jackson, 7th President of the United States. It is located in the village of Boneybefore in County Antrim, Northern Ireland.

The centre consists of a refurbished traditional thatched Ulster–Scots farmhouse, which is known to have been built in the 1750s and was home to Andrew Jackson's parents shortly before they emigrated to South Carolina in the United States. The interior of the farmhouse is effectively a small museum, consisting of original rooms decorated in the style of that period and featuring an extensive display on the life of Andrew Jackson.

The cottage's grounds feature the US Rangers Centre, which pays homage to the soldiers of the First Battalions of the elite US Rangers, which was first "activated" in the town Carrickfergus in 1942.

The Carrickfergus Borough Council made efforts to make the centre more accessible to tourists. These include the installation of new information plaques in the recent standardised style of those found elsewhere in Carrickfergus, as well as the installation of roadsigns that more clearly show its location. These changes were put in place in an attempt to promote the town's historical Ulster-Scots connection to the United States, a connection that many locals take a great deal of pride in. The Carrickfergus Borough Council was consolidated in 2015 into the Mid and East Antrim Borough Council, who have since opened the cottage five days a week for public visits.

== See also ==
- List of buildings and monuments honoring presidents of the United States in other countries
