= Dergalt =

Townland in County Tyrone, Northern Ireland

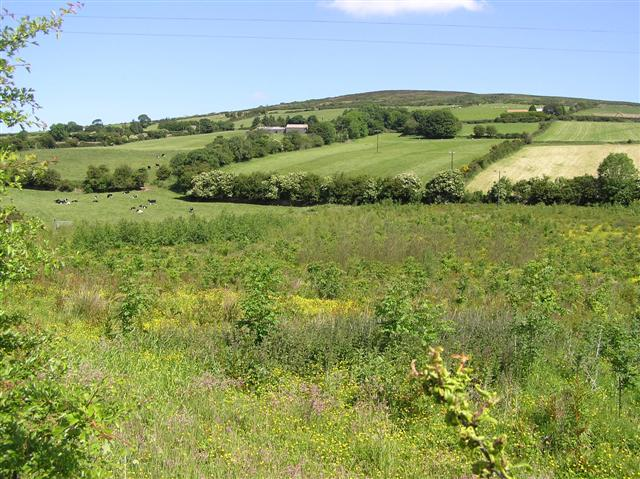
Dergalt townland in 2006

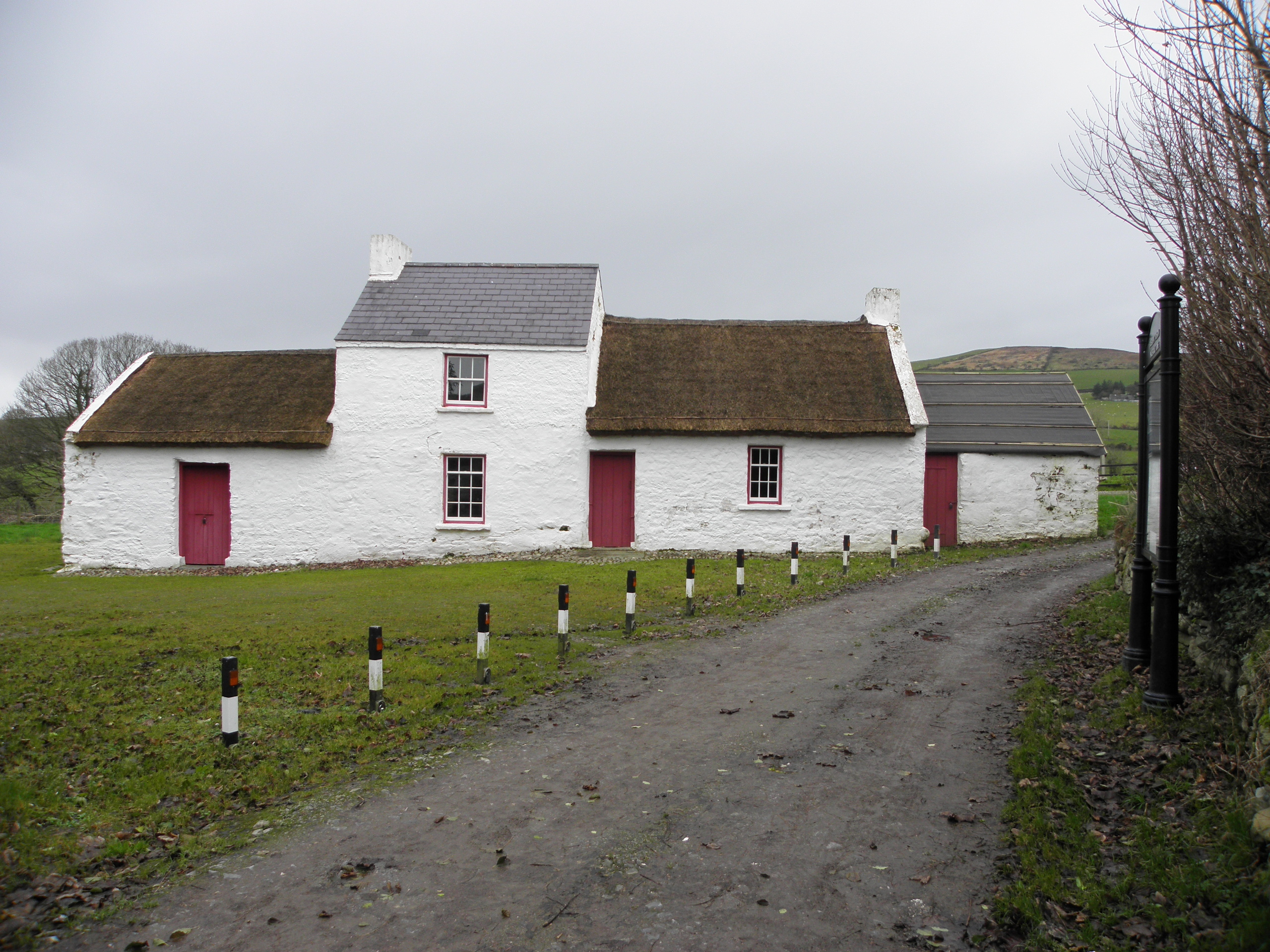
Wilson Homestead, Dergalt, 2006

Dergalt is a townland in County Tyrone, Northern Ireland. It is situated in the historic barony of Strabane Lower and the civil parish of Camus and covers an area of 488 acres. United States president Woodrow Wilson's ancestral home is located in the townland.

The name derives from the Irish: dearg alt (red glenside).

The population of the townland declined during the 19th century:

Year	1841	1851	1861	1871	1881	1891
Population	217	175	168	114	111	100
Houses	43	34	32	27	24	22

== See also ==
- List of townlands of County Tyrone
