= Boneybefore =

Village in County Antrim, Northern Ireland

Coordinates: 54°43′24″N 5°46′56″W

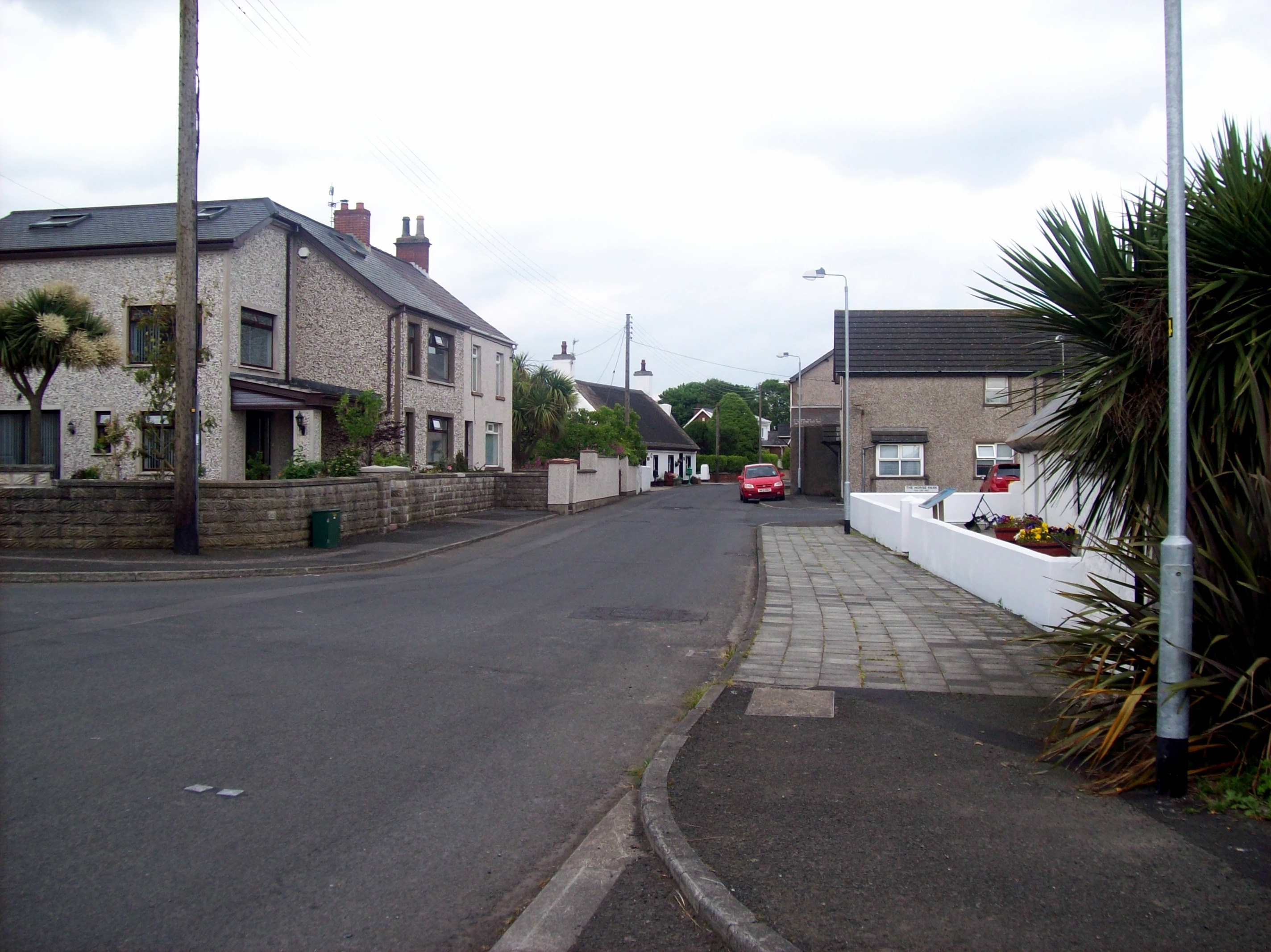
Boneybefore, facing east. The Andrew Jackson Cottage is just visible to the right.

Boneybefore (/ˈbɒnibɪˌfɔːr/ BON-ee-bi-for) is a village near Carrickfergus in County Antrim, Northern Ireland. It lies between the A2 road and Belfast Lough. It is home to the Andrew Jackson Centre (also known as the Andrew Jackson Cottage), the ancestral home of Andrew Jackson, 7th president of the United States.

== History ==
In some historical references the name of the village was originally Bonnybefore and given the English name of Fair Prospect before being changed to Boneybefore to reflect the local Ulster pronunciation of the name. It is also claimed that the name came from a French commander who landed in Boneybefore prior to the Battle of Carrickfergus and is alleged to have said: "A niver seen sich a bonny place before". Though Boneybefore was not formally recognised as a village until the 1820s, in 1829 there were twenty-one houses in the area of Boneybefore, including twelve identical cottages used as farmhouses.

== United States associations ==
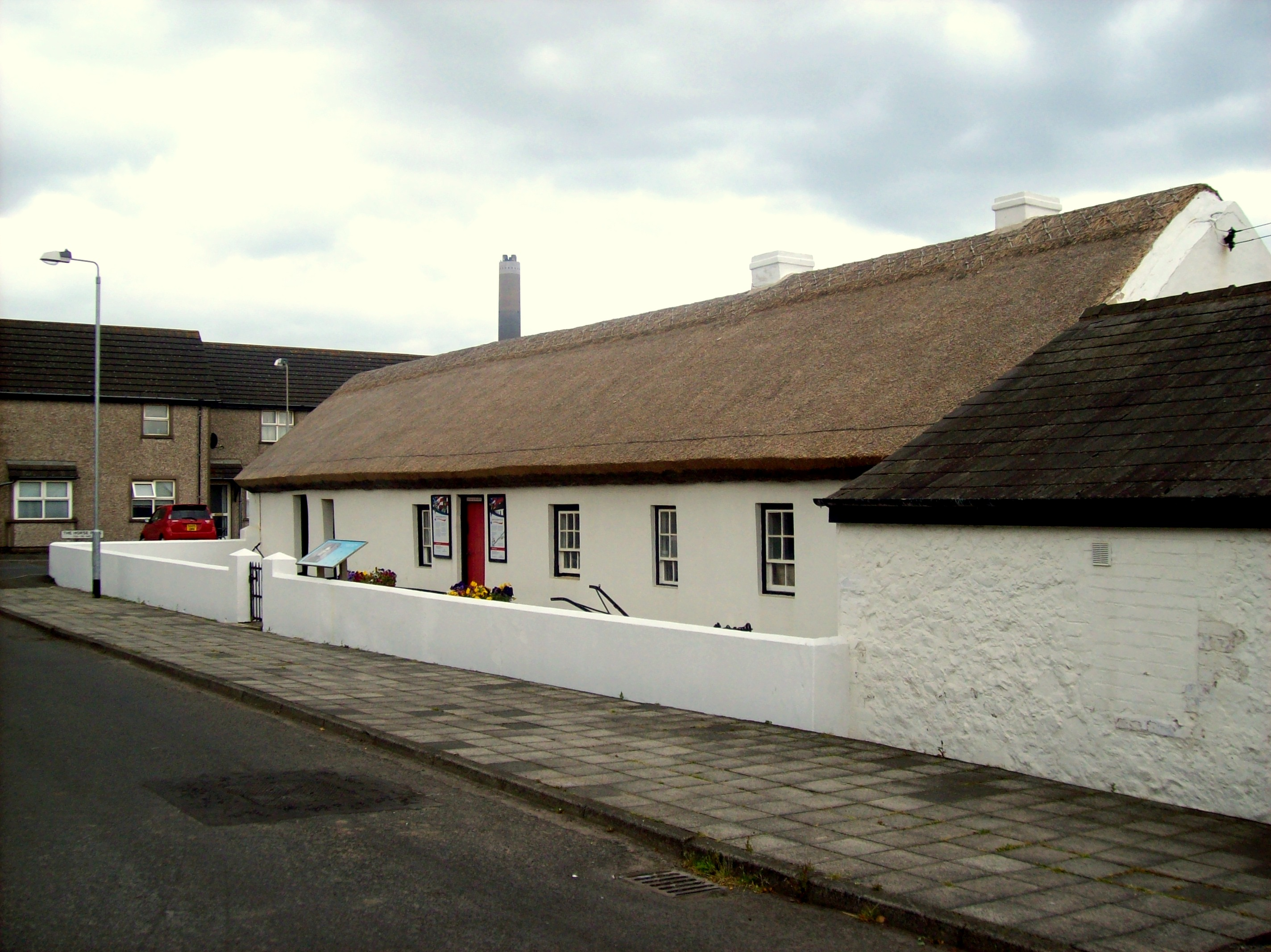
Andrew Jackson's cottage

Boneybefore is the location of the ancestral home of the 7th president of the United States, Andrew Jackson. It was a thatched farmhouse constructed in the 1750s. Though the original had been demolished to make way for the construction of railway lines, it was eventually restored in detail. It was rebuilt by the Donaldson family, who lived in it until 1979, when they sold it to Carrickfergus Borough Council. It had been open to the public since 1984. It temporarily closed in 2018 and underwent a ten-month, £250,000 renovation project to fix the thatched roof and repair damage from damp before reopening in 2019.

Boneybefore also hosts a United States Army Rangers centre which was opened as a museum to pay tribute to the 1st Ranger Battalion, who were activated in Northern Ireland in 1942 and based in nearby Carrickfergus. The museum opened in 1994 following a reunion of Rangers veterans to commemorate 50 years since the battalion's foundation and is operated by Mid and East Antrim Borough Council.
