= Killeeshil =

Townland in County Tyrone, Northern Ireland

Killeeshil is a townland (of 521 acres (211 ha)) and civil parish in County Tyrone, Northern Ireland. It is situated in the historic barony of Dungannon Lower. Killeeshil is home to their local community centre (killeeshil community centre) which helps the local community throughout killeeshil parish. It is also home to Killeeshil St Mary's GAC club, as well as the Killeeshil GAA pitch

The parish contains the following 23 townlands:

== A ==
Aghaginduff, Aghnahoe

== B ==
Ballynahaye, Bockets

== C ==
Cabragh, Clontyclevin, Clontyfallow, Coolhill, Cranlome, Cullentra

== D ==
Dergenagh, Drumfad

== E ==
Ennish, Eskragh

== F ==
Farriter, Fasglashagh

== G ==
Glencull

== K ==
Killeeshil

== L ==
Lisfearty, Lurgacullion

== M ==
Mullyroddan, Mullysilly, Mulnahunch

== See also ==
- List of civil parishes of County Tyrone
- List of townlands in County Tyrone
