= Dungannon Lower =

Dungannon Lower Dún Geanainn Íochtarach (Irish)
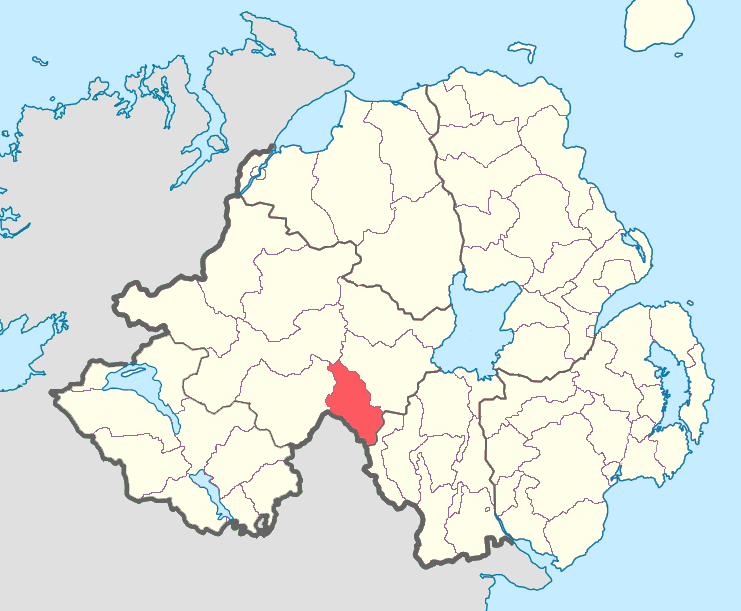
- Location of Dungannon Lower, County Tyrone, Northern Ireland.
- Sovereign state: United Kingdom
- Country: Northern Ireland
- County: Tyrone

Dungannon Lower (named after Dungannon town) is a historic barony in County Tyrone, Northern Ireland. It was created in 1851 with the splitting of the barony of Dungannon. It is bordered by four other baronies in Northern Ireland: Dungannon Middle to the north; Tiranny to the south-east; Clogher to the west; and Omagh East to the north-west. It is also bordered in the south-west by the barony of Trough in the Republic of Ireland.

== List of main settlements ==
- Aughnacloy
- Caledon

== List of civil parishes ==
Below is a list of civil parishes in Dungannon Lower:

- Aghaloo
- Carnteel
- Clonfeacle (split with Dungannon Middle, Armagh and Oneilland West)
- Killeeshil
