= Favour Royal =

Manor/estate in County Tyrone, Northern Ireland

Coordinates: 54.4197°N 7.051°W

Location of Favour Royal in Northern Ireland

Favour Royal (previously known as Portclare) is a manor and estate in County Tyrone, Northern Ireland. It is located in the townland of Favor Royal Demesne, around 3 miles (4.8 km) east of Augher, close to the Irish border. It is within the parish of Errigal-Trough which is part of the historic barony of Clogher.

== History ==
Portclare was granted, in 1613, by James I to Sir Thomas Ridgeway, a prominent figure in the plantation of Ulster. Samuel Lewis recorded Ridgeway's grants as comprising 3,000 acres (12 km^{2}) of arable land and extending over the present towns of Aughnacloy and Augher, including the districts of Lismore and Garvey, with all the intermediate country. In 1622 Ridgeway sold Portclare to Sir James Erskine, younger son of Alexander Erskine of Gogar. In 1665, ownership of the manor of Portclare was confirmed to the Erskines by Charles II, under the name Favour Royal. The estate was subsequently divided between Sir James Erskine's two granddaughters. Favour Royal comprises one part, while the other, lying to the west of Augher, is known as Spur Royal or Augher Castle.

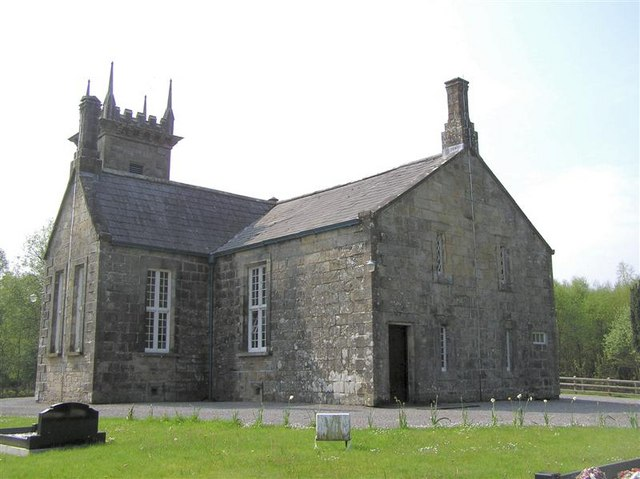
St Mary's, Portclare, on the Favour Royal Estate

John Moutray married the Erskine heiress of Favour Royal, and the original house was built by them in 1670. In 1816 the Moutrays briefly employed a local boy, John Hughes, as an apprentice gardener - Hughes would go on to become the Catholic Archbishop of New York in 1842. The old house was destroyed in 1823 by an accidental fire, and was replaced with a larger structure by Captain John Corry Moutray of Castle Coole. Captain Moutray commissioned the architect John Hargrave to design the new building, which was completed in 1825 in a Tudor Revival style. Captain Moutray also commissioned the building of a private chapel on the estate, consecrated on 3 July 1835, which is now the parish church of St Mary's, Portclare. Favour Royal continued to be the family home of the Moutrays until 1976, when the house, demesne and contents were sold. It was occupied until the 1990s but is now derelict.

The demesne comprised 740 acres (3.0 km^{2}) of fertile and highly cultivated land, and is finely diversified and richly wooded. The house is situated on the bank of the River Blackwater, and is built of freestone found on the estate. It is embellished with a noble portico, and with elegant architectural details. The demesne includes an ornamental lake and an 18th-century walled garden, and is listed on the Register of Parks, Gardens and Demesnes of Special Historic Interest. More recently it has been planted with coniferous forestry by the Forest Service Northern Ireland. Favour Royal Forest is one of Ireland's Millennium Forest sites. Several planning applications were submitted for permission to restore Favour Royal as a hotel and golf course, but these expired, and the house was on the market in 2013.

== See also ==
- Augher Castle, built by Sir Thomas Ridgeway
