= Favor Royal Demesne =

Townland in County Tyrone, Northern Ireland

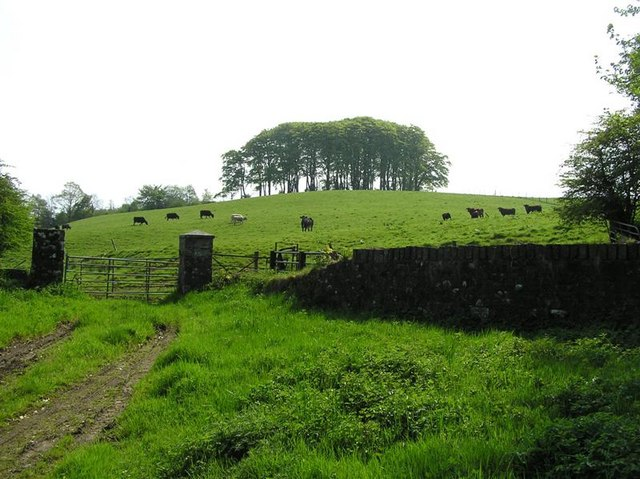
Rath (ringfort) in Favor Royal Demesne

Favor Royal Demesne, also spelled Favour Royal, is a townland in County Tyrone, Northern Ireland. It is situated in the barony of Clogher and the civil parish of Errigal-Trough, adjacent to the Irish border. The townland covers an area of 670 acres (270 ha).

In 1841 the population of the townland was 105 people (21 houses) and in 1851 it was 95 people (20 houses).

The townland is named after the demesne of Favour Royal, a manor granted to Sir Thomas Ridgeway in 1613. The demesne is listed on the Register of Parks, Gardens and Demesnes of Special Historic Interest, and the house, built in 1823 and currently derelict, is listed at grade B+. The townland also contains two scheduled historic monuments: both bivallate raths (grid refs: H6060 5290 and H6128 5215).

== See also ==
- List of townlands of County Tyrone
- List of archaeological sites in County Tyrone
