= Manor of Tor Mohun =

Historic manor and parish in England

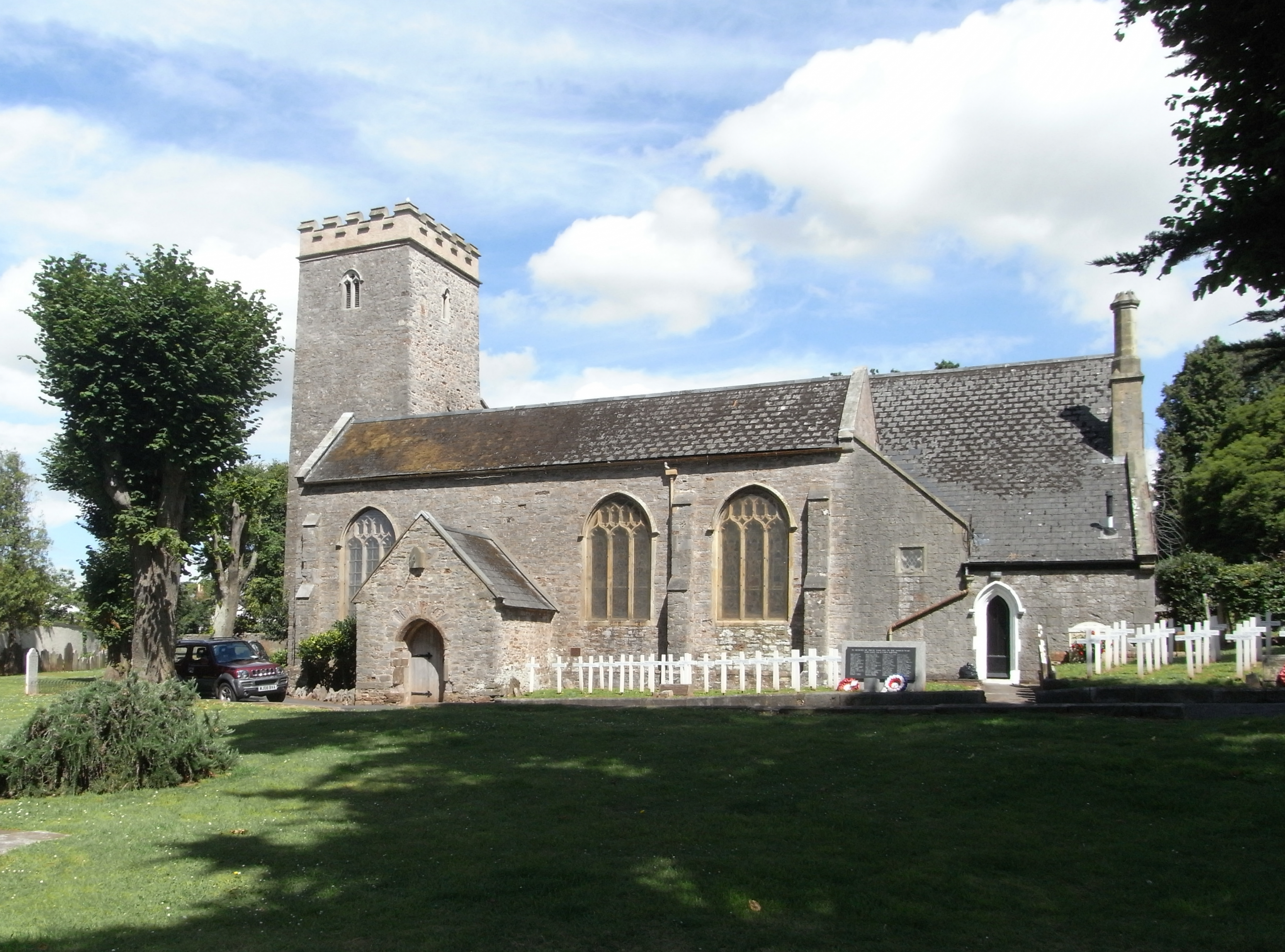
St Saviour's Church, the mediaeval parish church of Tor Mohun

Tor Mohun (formerly Tor Brewer) is a historic manor and parish on the south coast of Devon, England, now superseded by the Victorian sea-side resort of Torquay and known as Tormohun, an area within that town. In 1876 the Local Board of Health obtained the sanction of Government to alter the name of the district from Tormoham (sic) to Torquay.

The ancient Church of St Saviour, the parish church of Tor Mohun, is on Tor Church Road, today serving as the Greek Orthodox Church of Saint Andrew. It contains several monuments, most notably to Thomas Ridgeway (1543–1598) of Torwood House, lord of the manor of Tor Mohun, and of the Cary families of nearby Torre Abbey, and Cockington Court, both within the parish.

== Descent ==
Arms of Brewer

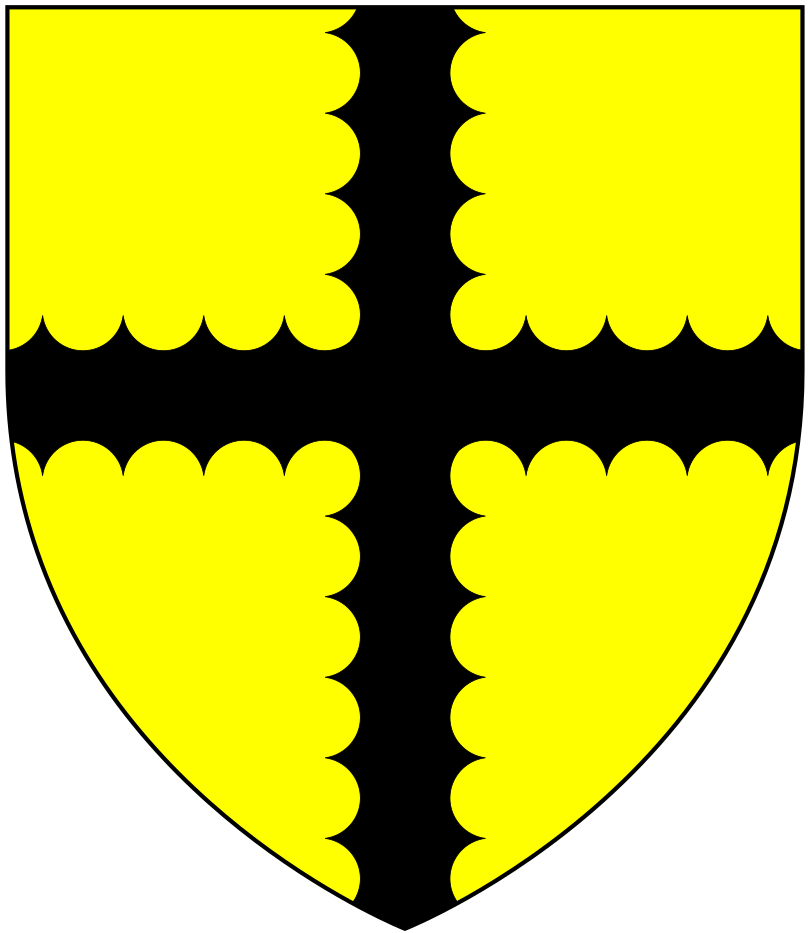
Arms of Mohun of Dunster

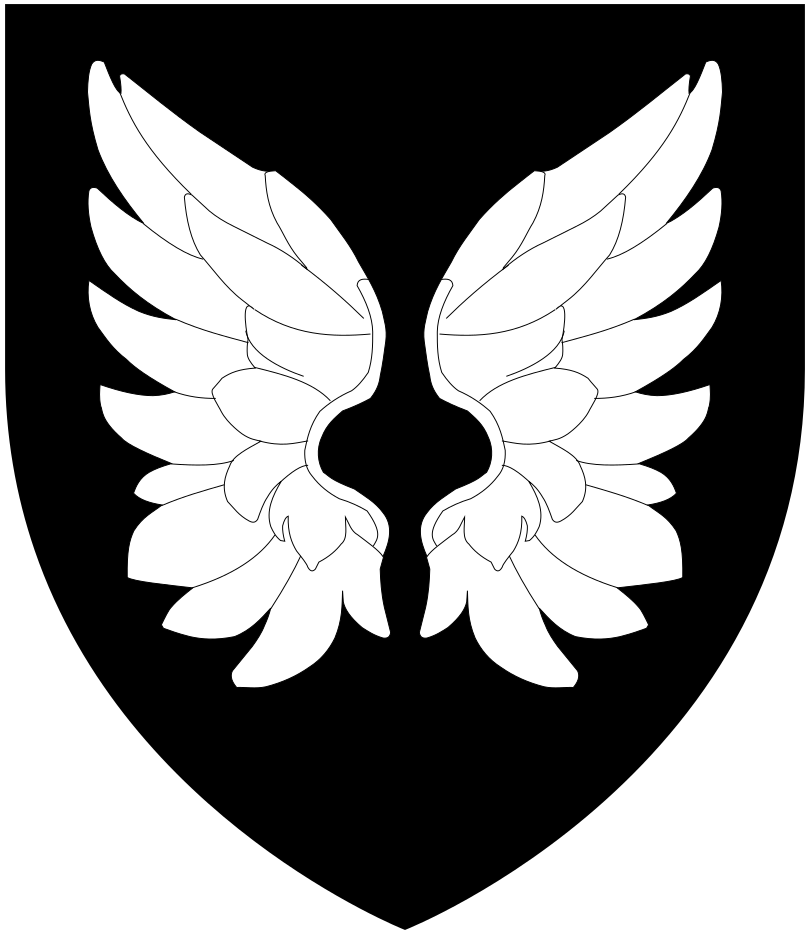
Arms of Ridgeway

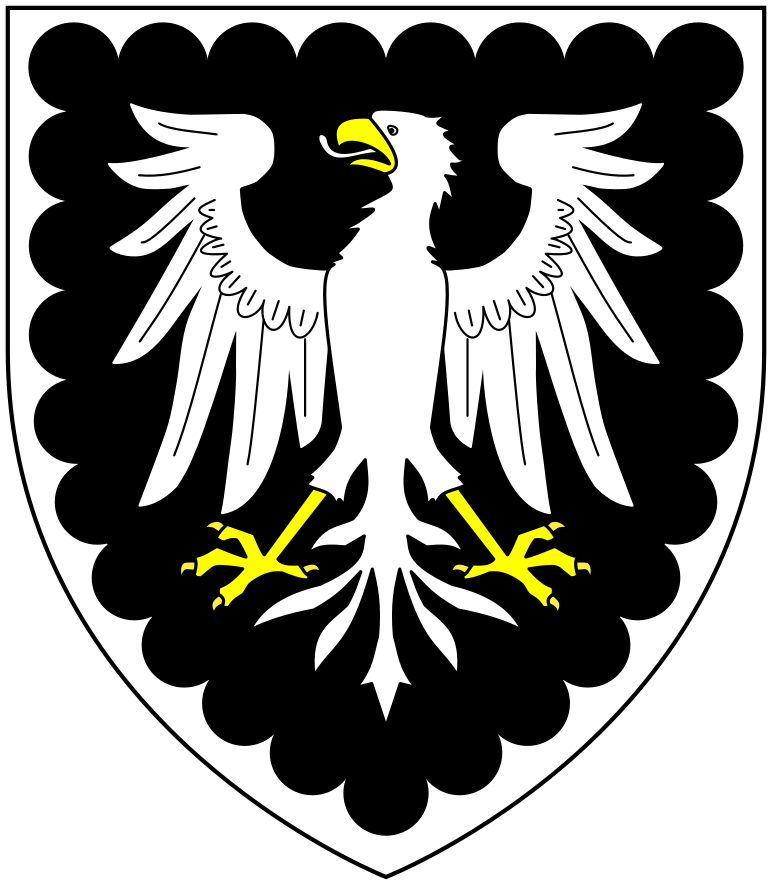
Arms of Palk

=== William the Usher ===
The manor of TORRE is listed in the Domesday Book of 1086 as held in-chief and in demesne by Willelmus Hostiarius ("William the Usher"), a servant of King William the Conqueror and one of the minor Devon Domesday Book tenants-in-chief of that king. He also held from the king in Devon the manors of Taw Green, Raddon, Bolham, Ilsham and Mariansleigh.

=== Brewer ===
The manor subsequently became known as Tor Brewer when held by William Brewer (died 1226). In 1196 he gave part of the manor's land for the founding of Torre Abbey, a monastery for Premonstratensian canons. The two estates of Tor Mohun and Torre Abbey remained apart until shortly after the Dissolution of the Monasteries in the 16th century and were once again parted in the 17th century (see below). Since Brewer's only surviving son died childless, his eventual heirs became his daughters, the fourth of whom, Alice married (as her first husband) Reginald de Mohun (1185–1213) feudal baron of Dunster, of Dunster Castle in Somerset. She brought him a great estate, and "is set down among the benefactors to the new Cathedral Church of Salisbury, having contributed thereto all the marble necessary for the building thereof for twelve years."

=== Mohun ===
Reginald de Mohun (1185–1213) acquired Tor on his marriage to Alice Brewer, and thenceforth it was known as Tor Mohun. She gave the manor to her younger son, who died childless, when it reverted to the Mohun family of Dunster. (For future descent see: Feudal barony of Dunster).

=== Ridgeway ===
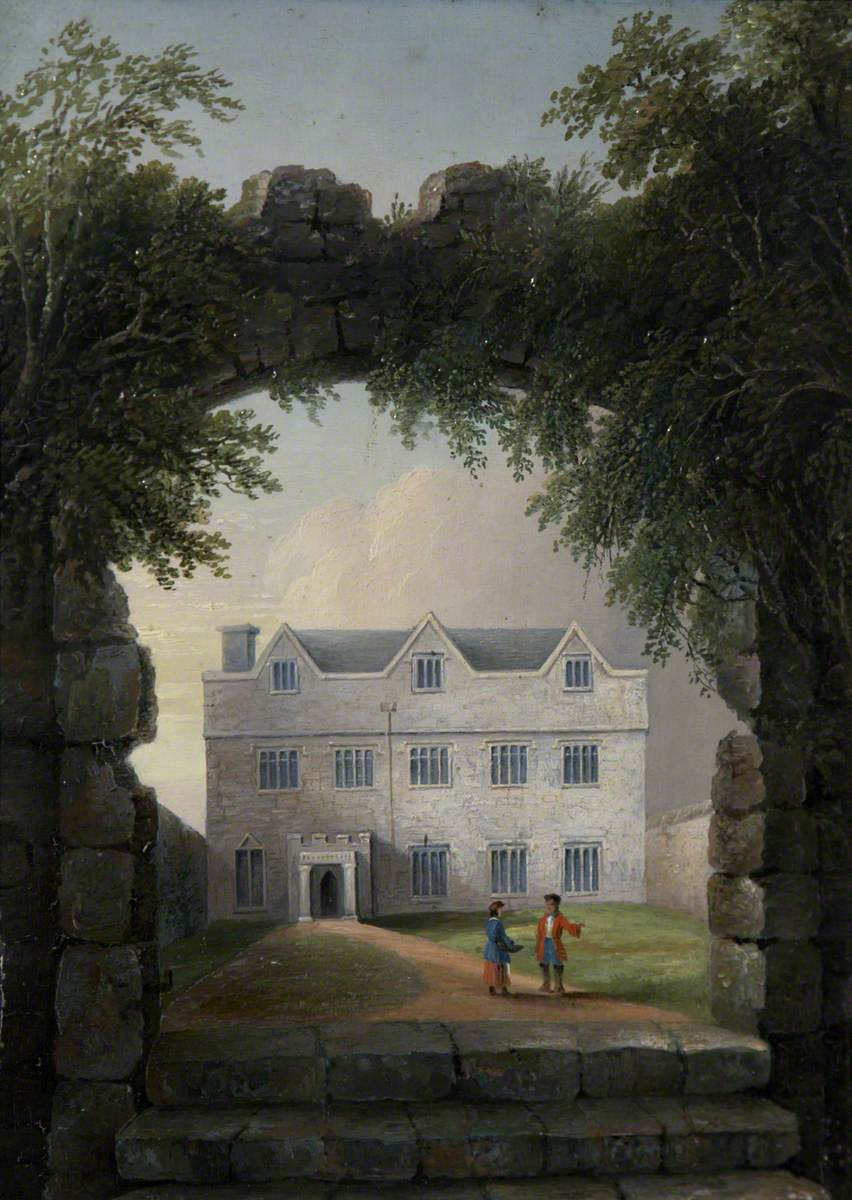
Torwood House, Tor Mohun, residence of the Ridgeway family. Demolished 1840s. Painted by John Wallace Tucker (1808–1869)

Tor Mohun was purchased by John Ridgeway (c. 1517 – 1560) of Abbots Carswell in Devon, a Member of Parliament for Dartmouth and Exeter. His son Thomas Ridgeway (1543–1598), MP, later purchased the adjoining Torre Abbey from Sir Edward Seymour, 1st Baronet (c. 1563–1613) of Berry Pomeroy, Devon. A monument to Thomas Ridgeway, with his effigy, survives in the former St Saviour's Church, Tor Mohun. Thomas Ridgeway's son was Thomas Ridgeway, 1st Earl of Londonderry (c. 1565 – 1631).

In 1653 Torre Abbey was sold to Sir John Stawell (1625-1669) of Parke in the parish of Bovey Tracey, Devon (whose mural monument survives in Bovey Tracey Church), a counsellor-at-law. In 1662 Stawell sold it to Sir George Cary, (d.1678) whose first cousin Sir Henry Cary, Sheriff of Devon in 1637, had sold nearby Cockington (the ancient Cary family seat) during the Civil War "in his zeal for royalty". The last male member of the family was Robert Ridgeway, 4th Earl of Londonderry (died 1714), who died without male progeny and was buried at Tor Mohun. His two daughters and co-heiresses were:

- Lucy Ridgeway (died 1736), wife of Arthur Chichester, 4th Earl of Donegall (1695–1757), without progeny. In 1768 Tor Mohun was sold "by the Earl of Donegal" (sic, deceased) to Sir Robert Palk, 1st Baronet (1717–1798), later of Haldon House in the parish of Kenn, Devon.
- Frances Ridgeway, wife of Thomas Pitt, 1st Earl of Londonderry (died 1729), who in 1726 was created Earl of Londonderry.

=== Palk ===
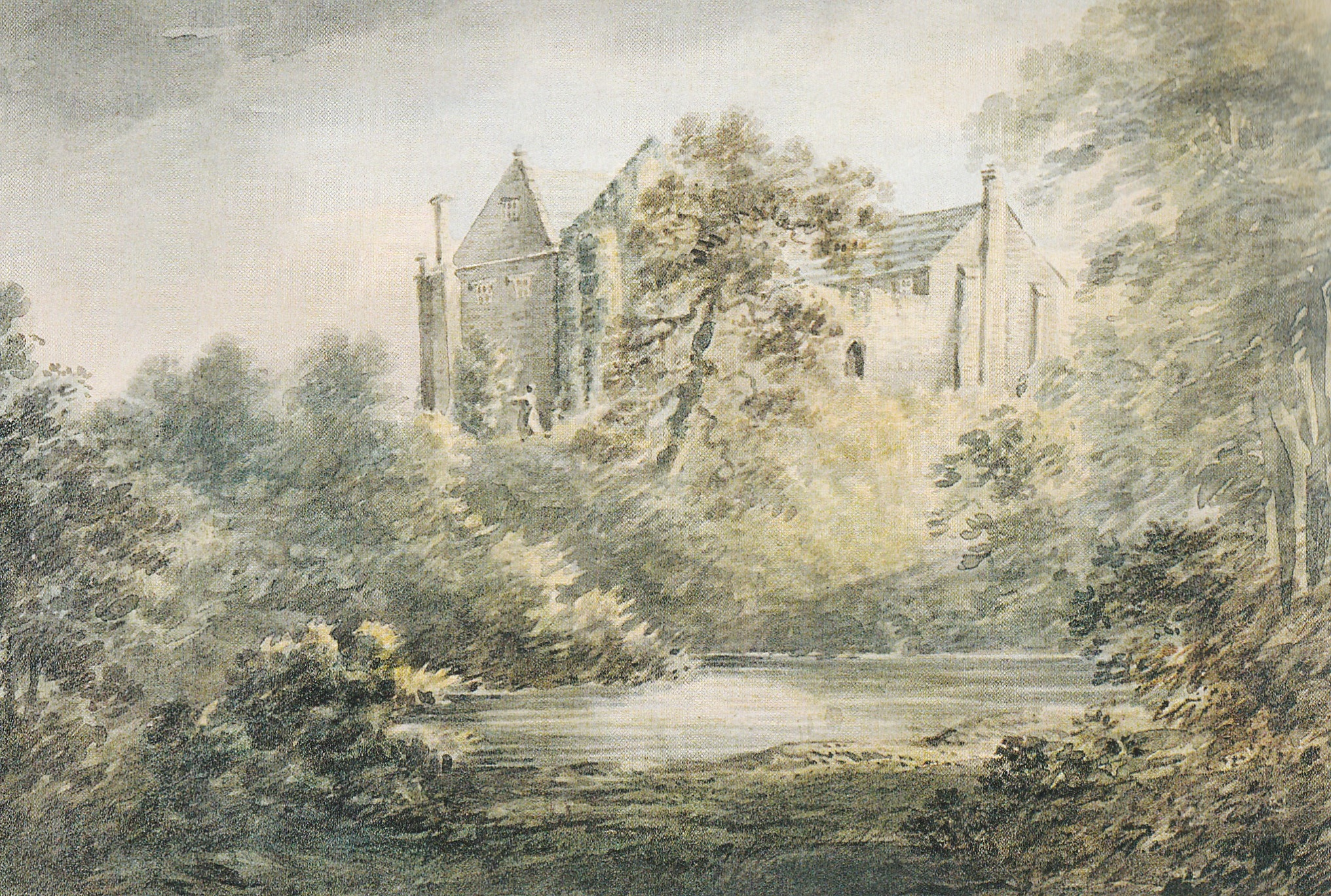
Torwood House, former mansion house of the Ridgeway family, painted by John Swete in 1793

In about 1768, the Earl of Donegal sold Tor Mohun with its manor house known as Torwood, and several other estates, to Sir Robert Palk, 1st Baronet (1717–1798), who had recently returned from his career as Governor of Madras in the East Indies with a "princely fortune" at his disposal and was "in quest of a seat in his native county where he might enjoy the fruits of his toil in elegant leisure and courteous hospitality". He was not however happy with the layout of the estate as fields next to Torwood House had been sold off by the Ridgeways and thus "interfered with the demesne", that is to say interfered with his privacy. He attempted to buy back the fields in question from his neighbour Mr Cary of Torre Abbey, who refused to sell. He therefore decided to alter his plan of turning Torwood House into a palatial residence, and purchased another estate at Haldon, where he built Haldon House as his new seat, one of the grandest houses in Devon. He let Torwood House and the Tor Mohun estate to a farmer ("converted it into a farm house" (Swete)). Torwood House was described by Rev. John Swete as follows, when he visited the area in 1793:

"The house was not quite half mile distant from the quay: passing by an elm of great bulk I ascended some steps and through an arch'd gateway enter'd a spacious court of a quadrangular form surrounded by high walls. The house had a venerable aspect, its windows formed by stone mullions and over its projecting doorway was a sculpture, possibly the arms of the family of Ridgeway, its antient possessor. The rooms within have nothing remarkable but their size; the Hall in particular possesses from this circumstance no small degree of consequence and the chamber above, now converted into a general dormitory for the servants of the farmer who rents the estate, seems to be of equal dimensions. There are however no other remains of the magnificence of the family that inhabited it, no fretwork, no sculpture but the arms I have before noticed, no painted glass in the windows..."

Swete painted three watercolours of the house and its setting in 1792/3, which survive in the Devon Record Office. The only element he found which reminded him of the "savour of antient workmanship" was the staircase, the steps of which were made not of planks but of solid blocks of oak. Eventually Palk, together with his neighbour Cary of Torre Abbey, devised a plan to develop the two adjoining estates of Tor Mohun and Torre Abbey into a seaside resort town for visitors, now Torquay. On a previous visit in 1792 to the then small village of "Torquay", Swete remarked in his Travel Journal: "About six in the evening I quitted Torquay which under the auspices of Sir Robert Palk (if the plans which I have seen be carried into execution) will be one day raised into importance".

Cockington Chapel was anciently a chapel of ease of St Saviour's Church, Tor Mohun.

The Manor itself and manorial title are now separated. The current manorial lord is American Philanthropist Terry A. Perkins.

== Sources ==
- Gray, Todd & Rowe, Margery (Eds.), Travels in Georgian Devon: The Illustrated Journals of The Reverend John Swete, 1789–1800, 4 vols., Tiverton: Devon Books, 1999.
- Risdon, Tristram (died 1640), Survey of Devon. With considerable additions. London, 1811.
- Sanders, I.J. English Baronies: A Study of their Origin and Descent 1086-1327, Oxford, 1960.
- Thorn, Caroline & Frank, (eds.) Domesday Book Vol. 9: Devon, Parts 1 & 2, Phillimore Press, Chichester, 1985. ISBN 0-85033-492-6
- Vivian, Lt.Col. J.L., (Ed.) The Visitations of the County of Devon: Comprising the Heralds' Visitations of 1531, 1564 & 1620. Exeter, 1895.
