= Robert Ridgeway, 4th Earl of Londonderry =

Anglo-Irish peer (died 1714)

Robert Ridgeway, 4th Earl of Londonderry (died 7 March 1714) was an Anglo-Irish peer.

== Early life ==
Londonderry was the son of Weston Ridgeway, 3rd Earl of Londonderry and Frances Temple. His father was the grandson of the former Cicely MacWilliam and Thomas Ridgeway, 1st Earl of Londonderry. His maternal grandparents were Sir Peter Temple, 2nd Baronet, MP for Buckingham, and the former Christiana Leveson.

== Career ==
Upon the death of his father in 1672, he became the 4th Earl of Londonderry (also "Lord Baron of Gallen Ridgeway").

== Personal life ==
In 1686, Lord Londonderry married Lucy Jopson, a daughter of Sir William Jopson, 2nd Baronet and Lucy Tindall. Together, they were the parents of:

- Lady Lucy Ridgeway (d. 1732), who married Arthur Chichester, 4th Earl of Donegall, son of Maj.-Gen. Arthur Chichester, 3rd Earl of Donegall and Lady Catherine Forbes (a daughter of the 1st Earl of Granard), in 1716.
- Lady Frances Ridgeway (d. 1772), who married Thomas Pitt, MP for Wilton and son of Thomas Pitt, President of Madras, in 1717. After his death in 1729, she married Robert Graham Robert Graham, of South Warnborough, Hampshire, in 1732.

Lord Londonderry of Tor Mohun in Devon died on 7 March 1714. As he had no male issue, his titles became extinct. His daughter, Lady Frances, inherited the estate of Cudworth in Yorkshire and, in 1726, his son-in-law Thomas Pitt was created Earl of Londonderry in the title's second creation.

=== Descendants ===
Through his daughter Lady Frances, he was posthumously a grandfather of Thomas Pitt, 2nd Earl of Londonderry, Ridgeway Pitt, 3rd Earl of Londonderry, and Lady Lucy Pitt (wife of Pierce Meyrick, the youngest son of Owen Meyrick of Bodorgan, Anglesey).

Peerage of Ireland
Preceded by Weston Ridgeway	Earl of Londonderry; 1672–1713	Extinct
Baronetage of England
Preceded by Weston Ridgeway	Baronet (of Torrington); 1672–1713	Extinct
