= John Ridgeway (died 1560) =

Member of the Parliament of England

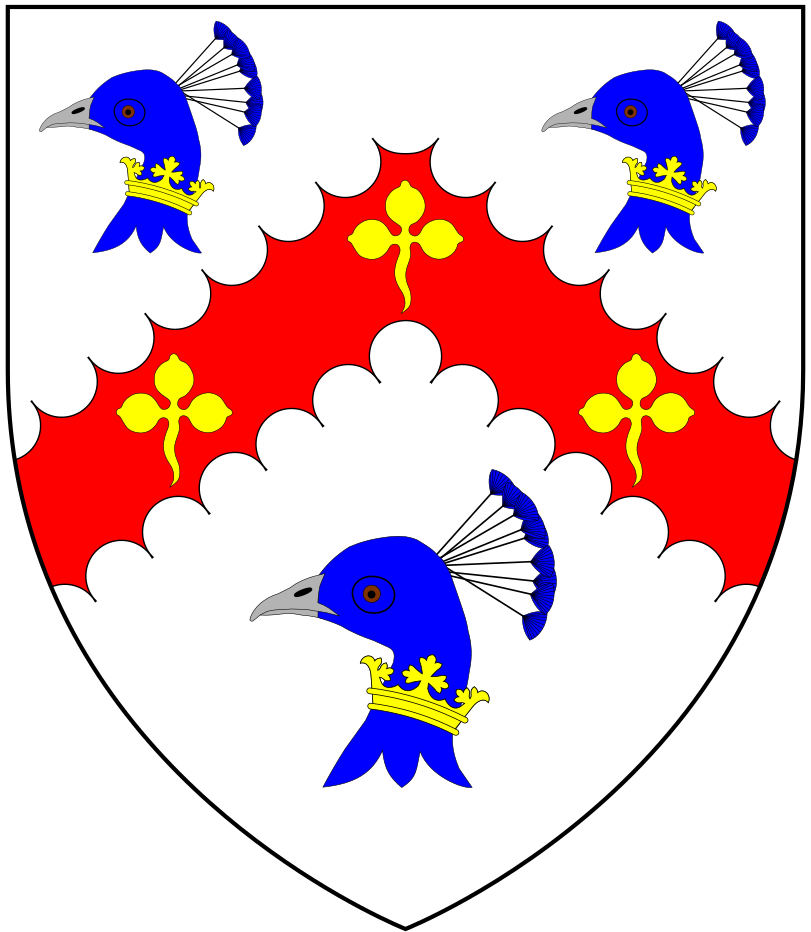
Canting arms of Ridgeway (ancient) alias Peacock: Argent, on a chevron engrailed gules three trefoils or between three peacock's heads erased azure crowns about their necks or

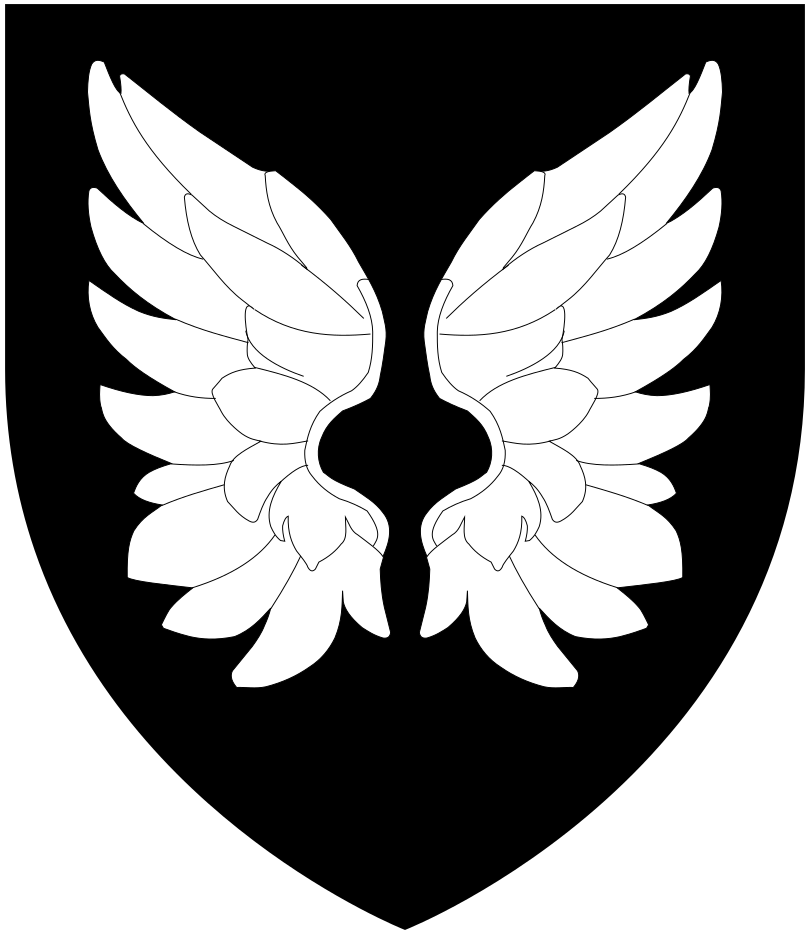
Arms of Ridgeway (modern): Sable, a pair of wings conjoined and elevated argent

John Ridgeway (c. 1517 – 1560) (alias Peacock) of Abbots Carswell and Tor Mohun in Devon, was a lawyer who served as a Member of Parliament, twice for Dartmouth in 1539 and 1545 and twice for Exeter in 1553 and 1554.

== Origins ==
He was the son of Michael Ridgeway of Newton Abbot, Devon, a brewer, the name of whose wife is not recorded. Vivian (1895) suggested he was the son of Stephen Ridgeway, Mayor of Exeter in 1491. An alternative surname of "Peacock", to that of Ridgeway, was declared in 1564 by his descendant to the heralds at the Heraldic Visitation of Devon, but this name has not been found in other surviving records. The ancient arms of "Ridgway" as recorded by Pole do however make a canting reference to this "alias": Argent, on a chevron engrailed gules three trefoils or between three peacock's heads erased azure crowns about their necks or. The family's modern arms, which they bore in the time of Pole (d.1635), were recorded by the latter as: Sable, two angel's wings conjoined tips upwards argent. These arms are displayed on the Ridgeway monument in Tor Mohun Church, and are a differenced version the arms of Barnehowse, whose co-heiress was Mary Southcott, the wife of Sir Thomas Ridgeway, son of John: Gules, two wings conjoined in lure argent.

== Career ==
He trained as a lawyer at the Middle Temple. In 1538, and immediately before the Dissolution of the Monasteries, he was appointed joint Chief Steward of Torre Abbey in Devon (which his son later purchased from the crown), and for Syon Monastery in Middlesex. He served as Escheator of Devon and Cornwall (1554-5) and occupied the honourable position of Recorder of Totnes in 1554. He was ordered by the crown to provide troops for the French campaign of 1544 and victuals for the war in Scotland in 1547.

== Land purchases ==
He acquired various manors in Devon including:

- Abbots Carswell in Devon, which he made his seat, formerly a possession of Sherborne Abbey in Dorset, which he acquired in 1540 following the Dissolution of the Monasteries, the bill enabling which (Suppression of Religious Houses Act 1539 (31 Hen. 8, c. 13)) he had voted in favour of in the Parliament of 1539.
- Tor Mohun, Devon, which he also made his seat, having purchased it from the feudal baron of Dunster (thus either Sir John Luttrell (died 1551) of Dunster Castle in Somerset, or his younger brother Thomas Luttrell (died 1571) of Dunster Castle). His son Thomas Ridgeway later purchased Torre Abbey, situated a few hundred yards to the south-west of his manor house at Tor Mohun, from Sir Edward Seymour, 1st Baronet of nearby Berry Pomeroy Castle, which had been acquired following the Dissolution of the Monasteries by his grandfather Edward Seymour, 1st Duke of Somerset, Lord Protector of England.

== Marriage and progeny ==
At some time before 1542 he married Elizabeth Wendford (alias Wondford), daughter of John Wendford of Newton Abbot, by whom he had one son and two daughters:

- Thomas Ridgeway (1543–1598), a Member of Parliament for Dartmouth in 1584 and father of Thomas Ridgeway, 1st Earl of Londonderry (c. 1565 – 1631).
- Anne Ridgeway, wife of Robert Prideaux (died 1579) of Ashburton, Attorney at Law and younger brother of John Prideaux (1520–1558) of Nutwell, Devon, Serjeant at Law, MP for Plymouth and Devon.
- Margaret Ridgeway, wife of Hugh Yeoworthe of Devon.

== Death and burial ==
He died at his seat of Tor Mohun on 24 April 1560 and was buried in St Saviour's Church, Tor Mohun.

== Memorial tablet ==
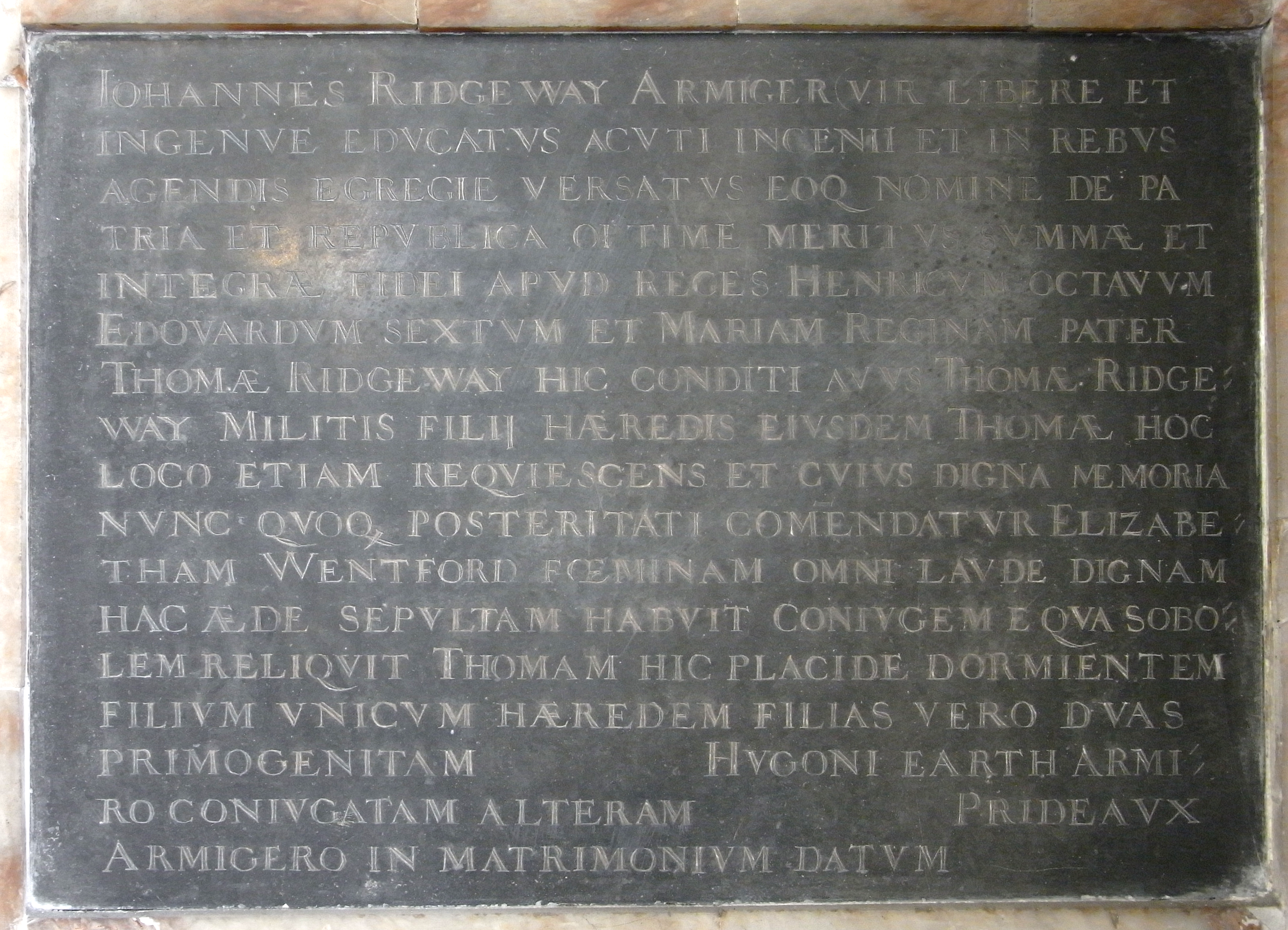
Inscribed tablet to John Ridgeway, Tor Mohun Church

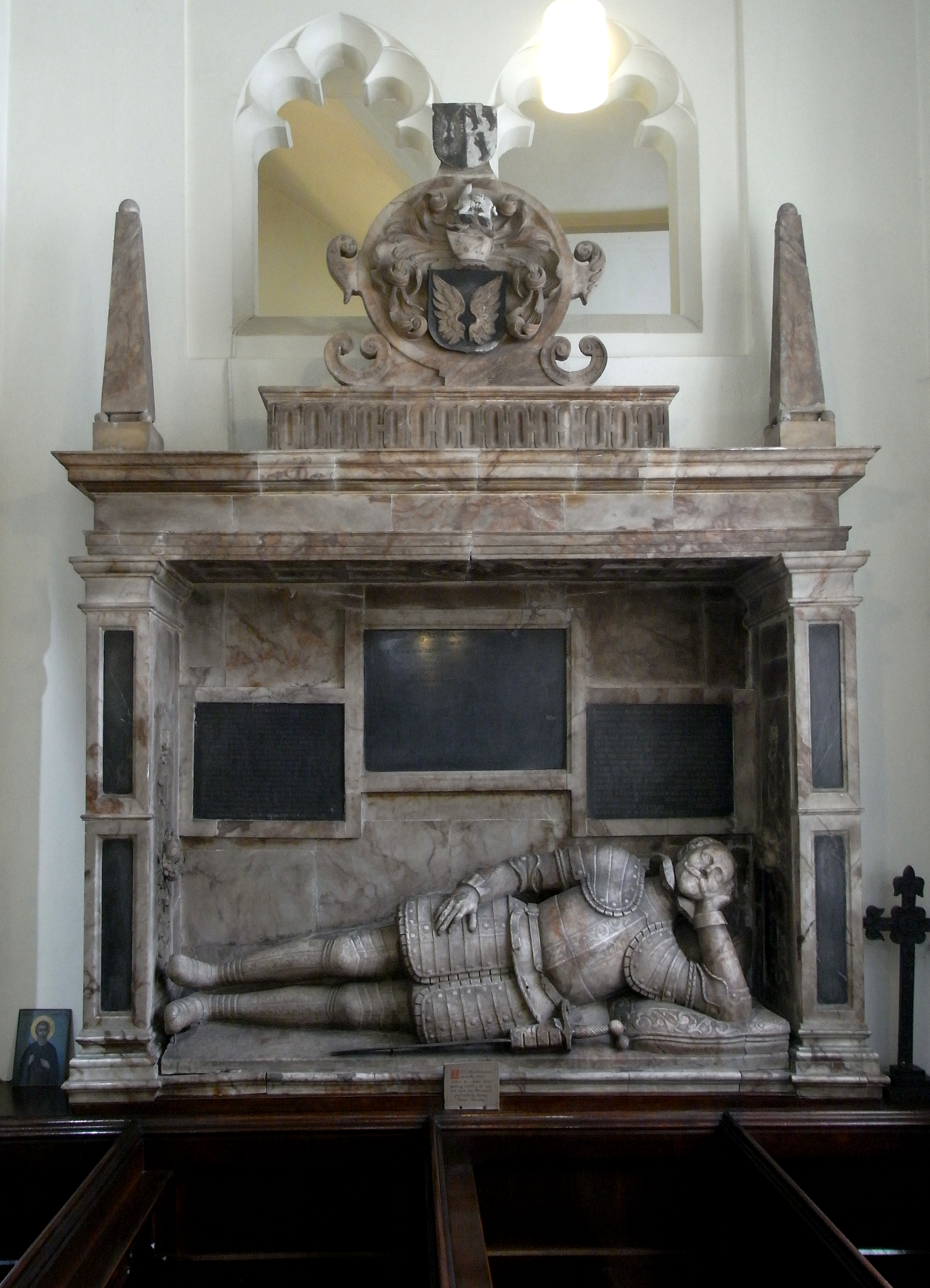
Monument to Sir Thomas Ridgeway (d.1598), Tor Mohun Church, on which the memorial tablet to his father John Ridgeway is affixed

An inscribed tablet in his memory forms one of three similar forming part of the surviving elaborate monument erected by his grandson in St Saviour's Church, primarily in memory of his father Sir Thomas Ridgeway, whose semi-recumbent alabaster effigy is displayed. The Latin inscription is as follows:

Johannes Ridgeway Armiger vir libere et ingenue educatus acuti ingenii et in rebus agendis egregie versatus eoq nomine de patria et republica optime meritus summae et integrae fidei apud reges Henricum Octavum Edovardum Sextum et Mariam reginam. Pater Thomae Ridgeway hic conditi avus Thomae Ridgeway Militis filii haeredis eiusdem Thomae hoc loco etiam requiescens et cuius digna memoria nunc quoq(ue) posteritati com(m)endatur. Elizabetham Wentford faeminam omni laude dignam hac aede sepultam habuit conjugem e qua sobolem reliquit Thomam hic placide dormientem filium unicum haeredem filias vero duas primogenitam (Margaretam) Hugoni Earth Armi(ge)ro conjugatam alteram (Annam) ..... Prideaux Armigero in matrimonium datum

Which may be translated: "John Ridgeway, Esquire, a man liberally and nobly educated, of sharp intellect and outstandingly skilled in effecting business and on that account most well deserving ..... Of the highest and unblemished loyalty towards Kings Henry the Eighth, Edward the Sixth and Queen Mary. The father of Thomas Ridgeway here buried, the grandfather of Sir Thomas Ridgeway, Knight, son and heir of the same Thomas, also resting in this place, the worthy memory of whom now also is commended to posterity. Elizabeth Wentford, a woman worthy of all praise buried in this church, he had as his wife, by whom he left progeny Thomas, here peacefully sleeping, his only son and heir, two daughters, the first-born (Margaret), married to Hugh Earth (i.e. "Yeoworthe"), Esquire, the second (Anne) given in marriage to ..... Prideaux, Esquire".

== Sources ==
- Virgoe, Roger, biography of Ridgeway, John (by 1517-60), of the Middle Temple, London, and Newton Abbot, Abbotskerswell and Tor Mohun, Devon, published in History of Parliament, House of Commons 1509-1558, ed. S.T. Bindoff, 1982
