= Fergal McCann =

Irish Gaelic football coach and trainer (1973–2021)

Personal information
- Native name: Fearghal Mac Cana (Irish)
- Born: May 1973 Augher, County Tyrone, Northern Ireland
- Died: 8 March 2021 (aged 47) Augher, County Tyrone, Northern Ireland
- Occupation: Games Promotion Officer

Sport
- Sport: Gaelic football
Club management
- Years: Club
- Augher St Macartan's; Killyclogher St Mary's; Carrickmore St Colmcille's; Omagh St Enda's
Inter-county management
- Years: Team
- 2005–2014: Tyrone (trainer)
Inter-county titles as manager
County	League	Province	All-Ireland
Tyrone	2	3	3

Fergal McCann (1973 – 8 March 2021) was an Irish Gaelic football coach and trainer. He had tenures with numerous clubs and was an All-Ireland SFC-winning trainer and coach with the Tyrone senior football team.

== Career ==
After finishing his playing career with the Augher St Macartan's club, McCann spent ten seasons as trainer and coach of the Tyrone senior football team. During that period the team won their second and third All-Ireland SFC titles. Working closely alongside manager Mickey Harte, McCann also helped the team to three Ulster SFC titles. After leaving the Tyrone set-up at the end of the 2014 season, he went on to coach a number of clubs in the county, including Killyclogher St Mary's and Carrickmore St Colmcille's.

== Death ==
McCann had been ill for a number of years and died, aged 47, on 8 March 2021.

== Honours ==
Tyrone

- All-Ireland Senior Football Championship: 2005, 2008
- Ulster Senior Football Championship: 2007, 2009, 2010
