= St Michael's Chapel, Torquay =

Chapel in Devon, England

St Michael's Chapel
- St Marie/Mary's Chapel Ghosts are found here of the slaves that built the chapel to see the shipwreck
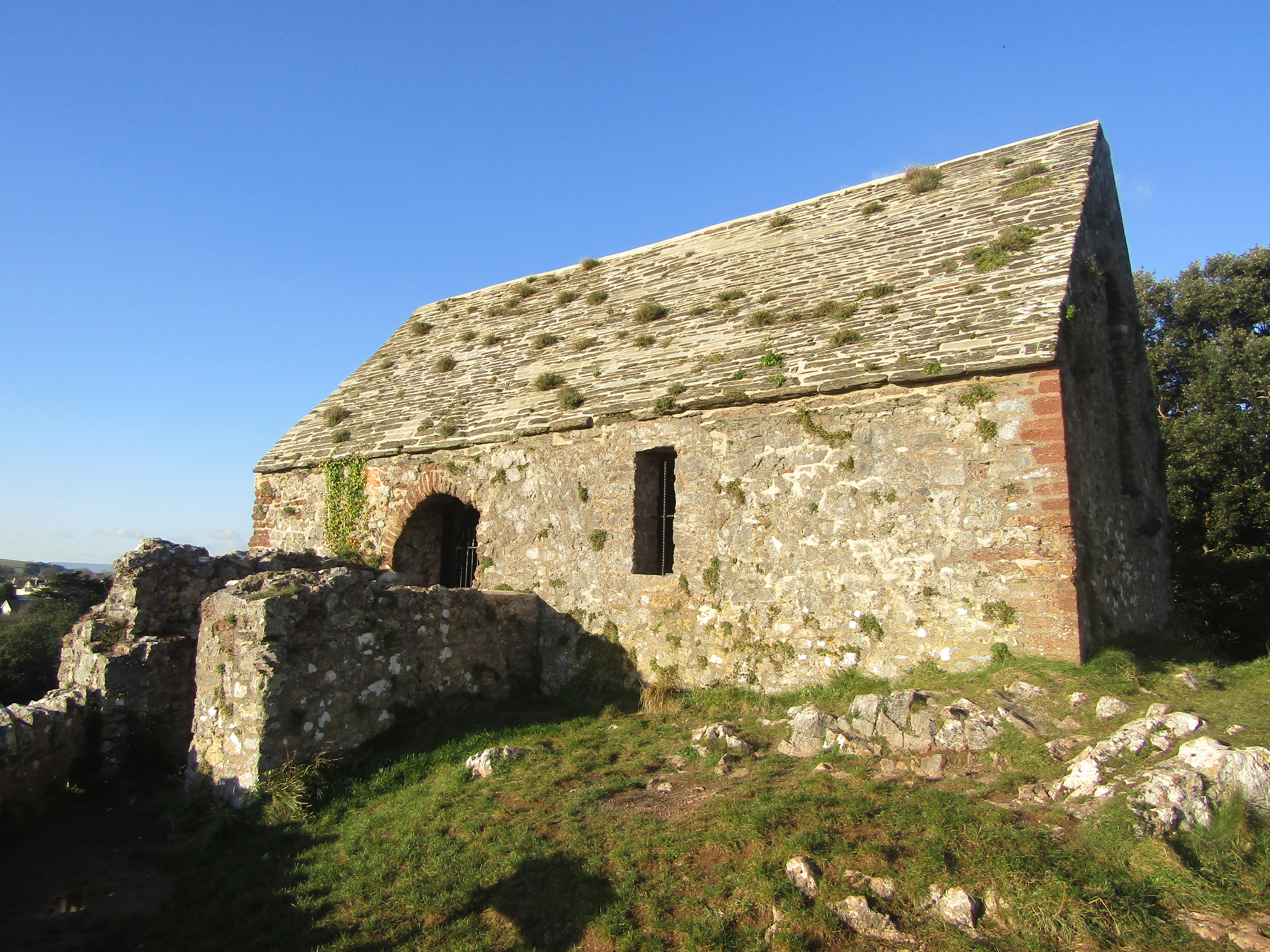
- A view of the chapel from the summit of the hill

- Location within Devon
- 50.4754°N 3.5472°W
- Type: Chapel
- Location: Torre, Torquay
- Nearest city: Torquay
- OS grid reference: SX903650

History
- Built: 13th/14th century

Site notes
- Architectural style: Medieval

Listed Building – Grade II
- Designated: 13 May 1952

St Michael's Chapel is a small, aisleless, medieval chapel situated on the summit of Chapel Hill, in Torquay, Devon. The structure is considered to date from around the 13th or 14th century. It was Grade II listed on 13 May 1952 and reclassified as a Scheduled Monument on 18 July 2000.

== Description ==
The chapel is oriented east-west and is constructed of local grey limestone rubble, with red sandstone entrance and window dressings and quoins, and a stone slate roof. The chapel retains much of its medieval fabric.

It has a single arched doorway (in the south wall) which is fronted by the remains of a stone porch. The entrance is currently barred by a modern iron grill.

The interior retains some original wall plaster, a niche in the south wall which may have been a piscina, and opposing windows in the north and south walls. Two further small windows are set into the west wall. There is also a large window in the east wall.

A Bathstone cross erected in the mid 19th century by the Marchioness of Bute stood on the east side of the roof, but this was removed during renovation work.

The floor of the chapel retains its natural unhewn bedrock, which shows considerable signs of wear close to the entrance, indicating many years of use. This suggests that an artificial floor was never constructed.

== History ==
The chapel being situated on a high rocky promontory at some distance from human habitation in medieval times suggests a special foundation. Its floor being composed of unhewn natural bedrock is taken to suggest that the chapel was so sited due to a religious vision being reported, resulting in the sanctity of the bare rock being respected and thus left uncovered.

The chapel may have belonged to Torre Abbey, which lies approximately 1.5 km to the south. However, direct supporting evidence for its connection with the abbey only exists for the post-medieval period.

The building is labeled as St Marie's Chapel on John Speed's 16th century map of Devon. An earlier, similar dedication to St Mary is also present in records from the 17th century.

A guidebook of 1793 reports that 'The Tor Chapel, perched on the summit of the ridge of rocks, once an appendage of the abbey before us and as it has not been desecrated it is sometimes visited by Roman Catholic crews of the ships lying in the bay.' Similarly it is reported in The History of Torquay (published in 1878) by J.T White that 'up to within the last half century, when any foreign vessels arrived in Torquay, the crews of which were Roman Catholic, they invariably paid a visit to St. Michael's Chapel.'

Elizabeth Goudge, when she lived in Marldon, Devon, used J.T. White's account as the legendary basis for her 1950 novel Gentian Hill. In her Note to the novel, Goudge says: "This story is a retelling of the legend of St. Michael’s Chapel at Torquay. Built in the thirteenth century, it was in existence until not so many years ago, and until the beginning of the nineteenth century any foreign vessels dropping anchor in Torbay, and possessing Roman Catholic crews, sent them on pilgrimages to the Chapel".
