= Abbey Park and Meadows =

Public park in Devon, UK

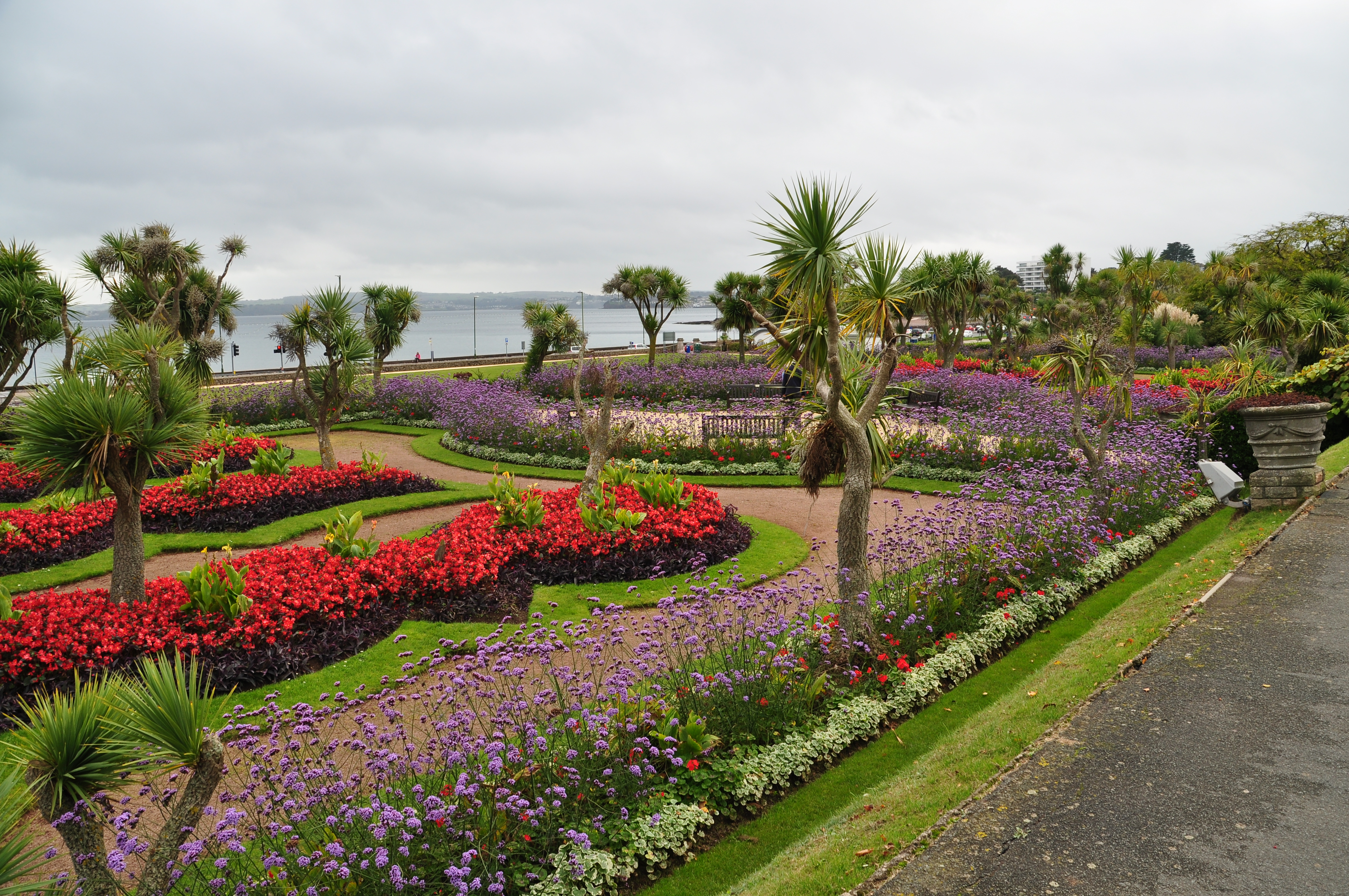
- Formal garden in Abbey Park
- Interactive map of Abbey Park and Meadows
- Type: public
- Location: Torquay, Devon, UK
- Nearest city: Exeter
- Coordinates: 50.463°N 3.538°W
- Created: 1924
- Operator: Torbay Council

Abbey Park and Meadows is a public park located in Torquay, Devon, which stretches from Torre Abbey to the town's seafront. The park has a number of facilities, including tennis courts, bowling greens, crazy golf and a café. It also hosts an Italian garden with a pond and various flower displays. The meadow is a large open space used for picnics and to host events, and also has a pitch and putt course.

== History ==
The local Council, then known as Torquay County Council purchased the land in 1924 for £40,000, and developed into the park it is today. The first facilities to be completed were the tennis courts, which hosted a Davis Cup match in 1924.
