= Thomas Ridgeway, 1st Earl of Londonderry =

English administrator in Ireland (1550–1631)

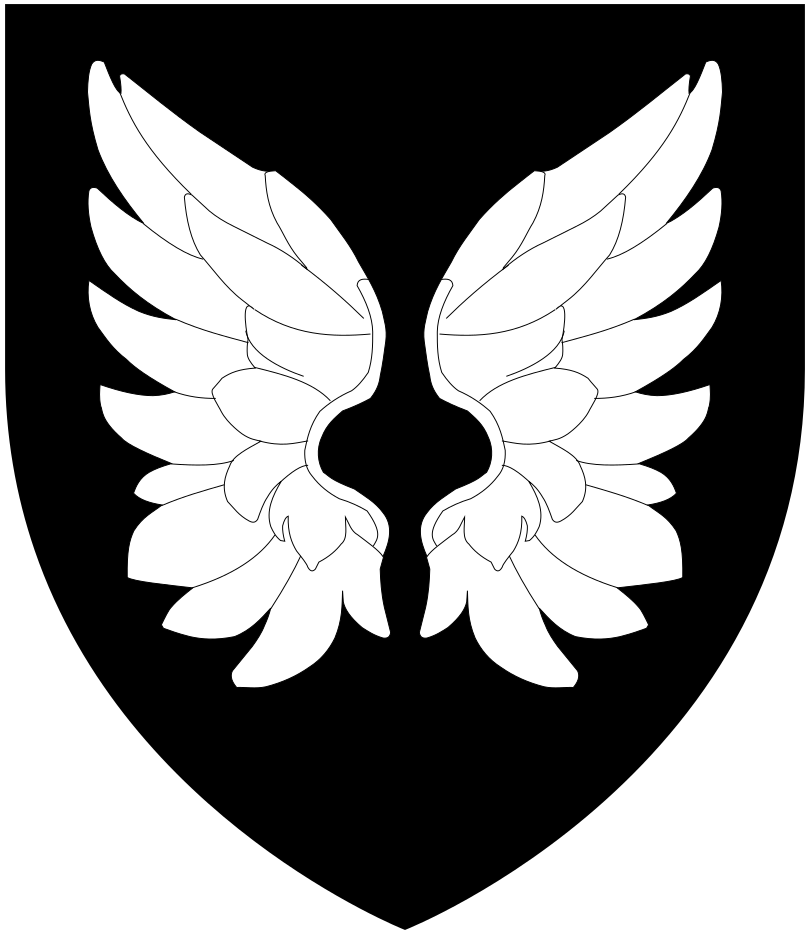
Arms of Ridgeway (modern): Sable, a pair of wings conjoined and elevated argent

Thomas Ridgeway, 1st Earl of Londonderry (1550 – 1631) was an English administrator active in Ireland, in particular in the Ulster Plantation. He became Treasurer of Ireland, M.P. for Devon, and built Augher Castle in Augher, County Tyrone, on the Favour Royal Estate. He helped suppress the rebellion of Sir Cahir O'Doherty in Ireland and was made Earl of Londonderry by King James I of England.

== Origins ==
He was born in about 1550 either at Torwood House in his father's manor of Tor Mohun, Devon, the son of Thomas Ridgeway (1525–1586) of Tor Mohun, Devon (son of John Ridgeway (c. 1517 – 1560) of Abbots Carswell and Tor Mohun, MP), a Member of Parliament for Dartmouth in 1584. His mother was Mary Southcott, daughter of Thomas Southcott of Indio in the parish of Bovey Tracey, Devon. With her sister Elizabeth Southcott, she was a co-heiress to her mother Grace Barnehouse, daughter and sole heiress of John Barnehouse of Marsh in the parish of Newton St Cyres and of Prestcot in the parish of Culmstock, both in Devon, a younger branch of Barnehouse of Kingston in the parish of Staverton, Devon.

The Ridgeway family adopted new arms at about this time, being a difference of the arms of Barnehouse, whose arms were: Gules, two wings joined in lure argent. The former canting arms of Ridgeway (alias Peacock) were: Argent, on a chevron engrailed gules three trefoils or between three peacock's heads erased azure crowns about their necks or.

== Career ==
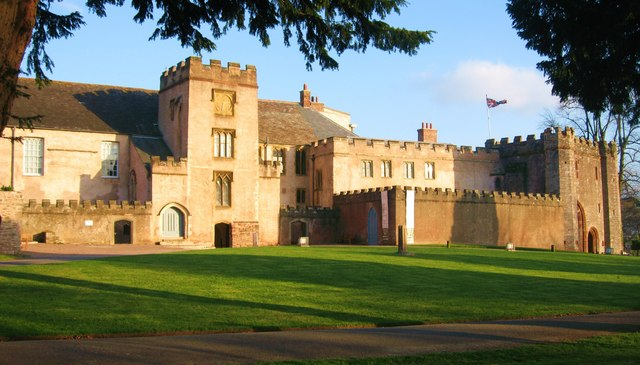
Torre Abbey in Devon, his family seat

He matriculated at Exeter College, Oxford, on 17 November 1581, and was admitted a student of the Inner Temple in 1583. Subsequently, he was collector of customs at Exmouth. He succeeded his father on 27 June 1597, and in July of that year fitted out a ship at his own cost to take part in the Essex-Raleigh Expedition under Robert Devereux, 2nd Earl of Essex. In 1599, he purchased Torre Abbey in Devon from Sir Edward Seymour, 1st Baronet, who lived at the nearby Berry Pomeroy Castle. He was High Sheriff of Devon in 1600, and was knighted in the same year.

He is said to have taken part in the wars in Ireland, and may have done so under Lord Mountjoy. He was returned M.P. for Devon on 28 February 1604 to the Parliament of 1604–11, but resigned when appointed Treasurer of Ireland in 1606, a post which would require his long-term absence overseas. In 1603, he had been appointed vice-treasurer and treasurer-at-wars in Ireland under Lord Deputy Sir George Cary, whom he eventually succeeded as treasurer in April 1606. He held that office until 1616, being admitted a privy councillor on 20 October 1606. On 30 November 1606, he submitted a project to Robert Cecil, 1st Earl of Salisbury for increasing the crown revenues. On 18 December, warrant was given to the Lord Chancellor of Ireland to issue a commission to him and certain others to inquire into abbey lands in County Dublin. He had apparently about this time been appointed master of the hawks and game in Ireland, an office formerly in the possession of Sir Geoffrey Fenton.

When the news of the rebellion of Sir Cahir O'Doherty reached Dublin (April 1608), the Lord Deputy of Ireland, Sir Arthur Chichester, immediately despatched a strong force into the north, under the marshal, Sir Richard Wingfield and Sir Oliver Lambart. Ridgeway went with them and distinguished himself; and Chichester knighted his eldest son, Robert, at that time sixteen years of age, who had accompanied him. He assisted in the preliminary work of surveying the escheated counties of Ulster preparatory to the plantation, and on 30 November urged on Salisbury the necessity of putting the scheme into execution as speedily as possible. He was thanked by the king for his diligence, but the survey proved defective. On 19 July 1609, a new commission was issued to him and others. On 31 July the commissioners set out from Dublin towards the north, returning about the beginning of October, but it was not until the end of February 1610 that the inquisitions taken by them were drawn up in legal form and the maps properly prepared. Arriving in London about 12 March, Ridgeway had an interview with Salisbury, and handed over to him all the documents connected with the survey.

=== Later Career ===
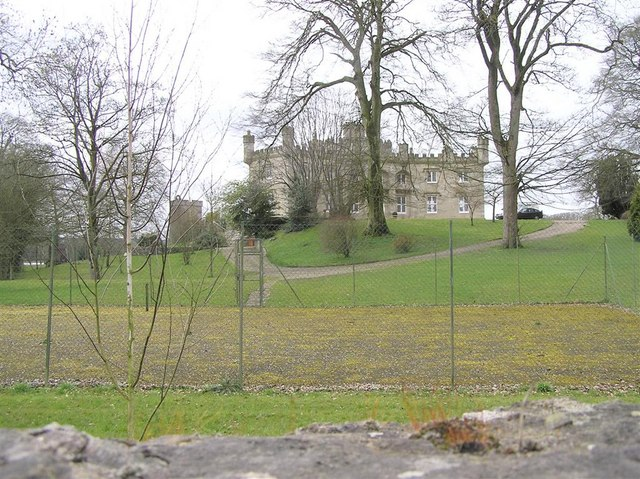
Augher Castle in Augher, County Tyrone, on the Favour Royal Estate. Castle initially built by Ridgeway

During the next few weeks, he was engaged with Sir John Davies and the commissioners for Irish affairs, before the lords of the council, in assisting to make a selection from the long lists of servitors willing to plant, transmitted by Chichester, and in deciding as to the most suitable districts for locating the principal Irish. In the discharge of these and other duties connected with the grand movement in Ulster, he was in London until the beginning of July. Meanwhile, new commissioners, of whom he was one, had been appointed to carry the scheme into execution; and Ridgeway, as soon as he was relieved from attendance on the council, sailed over in a small boat of seven or eight tons.

His arrival caused things to move briskly. He himself was assigned, as an undertaker, two thousand acres (8 km^{2}) in the precinct of Clogher, County Tyrone, lying on the south-eastern border of the barony of Clogher, adjoining the parish of Errigal Trough in County Monaghan, and represented on the map as well-wooded and containing little bog or wasteland. To this were subsequently added on 22 April 1613 the lands around Augher. Further, as a servitor, there was assigned to him another estate of two thousand acres (8 km^{2}) in the precinct of Dungannon, County Tyrone, lying along the upper course of the Blackwater, and represented as abounding in woods and bog land. He was one of the first to take out his letters patent, and from a report made of the state of the plantation in 1611, he appears to have been fairly active in fulfilling his obligations as an undertaker.

The settlement of Ulster having caused a great drain on the English exchequer, it was suggested to James I in 1611 that there were many gentlemen who would willingly pay for a hereditary title, and that the money thus obtained might be used for the support of the army in Ulster. The king's consent having been obtained, one of the first to take advantage of the new order thus created was Ridgeway, who for the payment of £1,200 was created a baronet on 25 November 1611.

In anticipation of the intended calling of a Parliament of Ireland, and with the object of securing a majority in it for the new settlers, a number of boroughs were created in 1612, and on 13 November Ridgeway was constituted a burgess of Balinakill in Gallen-Ridgeway, Queen's County, of which place he was elected MP on 17 April 1613. He was likewise returned as one of the knights of the shire for County Tyrone on 23 April to the parliament which met at Dublin on 18 May, and it was on his motion that Sir John Davies was elected speaker, thus giving rise to the counter-election of Sir John Everard. On 1 April 1615 a commission was issued to the Lord Chancellor and others to take his accounts as Treasurer. Some exception was made as to certain sums of money expended by him but he was discharged of his office in 1616, and on 25 May was created Lord Ridgeway, baron of Gallen-Ridgeway.

On 19 August 1622, he sold his proportion called Portclare and Ballykillygirie, including Agher, to Sir James Erskine, eleventh son of Alexander, second son of John Erskine, 5th Lord Erskine, and younger brother of Thomas Erskine, 1st Earl of Kellie. The transaction was nominally a sale, but strictly an exchange of the Portclare and Ballykillygirie estate for the title and dignity of an earldom, of which Erskine had the disposal. Accordingly, on 23 August 1623, he became Earl of Londonderry. In the Star chamber proceedings against Thomas Howard, 1st Earl of Suffolk in October 1619 one of the strongest pieces of evidence against him was a direct statement of Ridgeway that during the time he had been vice-treasurer he had never been able to obtain the money needed for the public service unless his demand was accompanied by a bribe.

== Death and Family ==
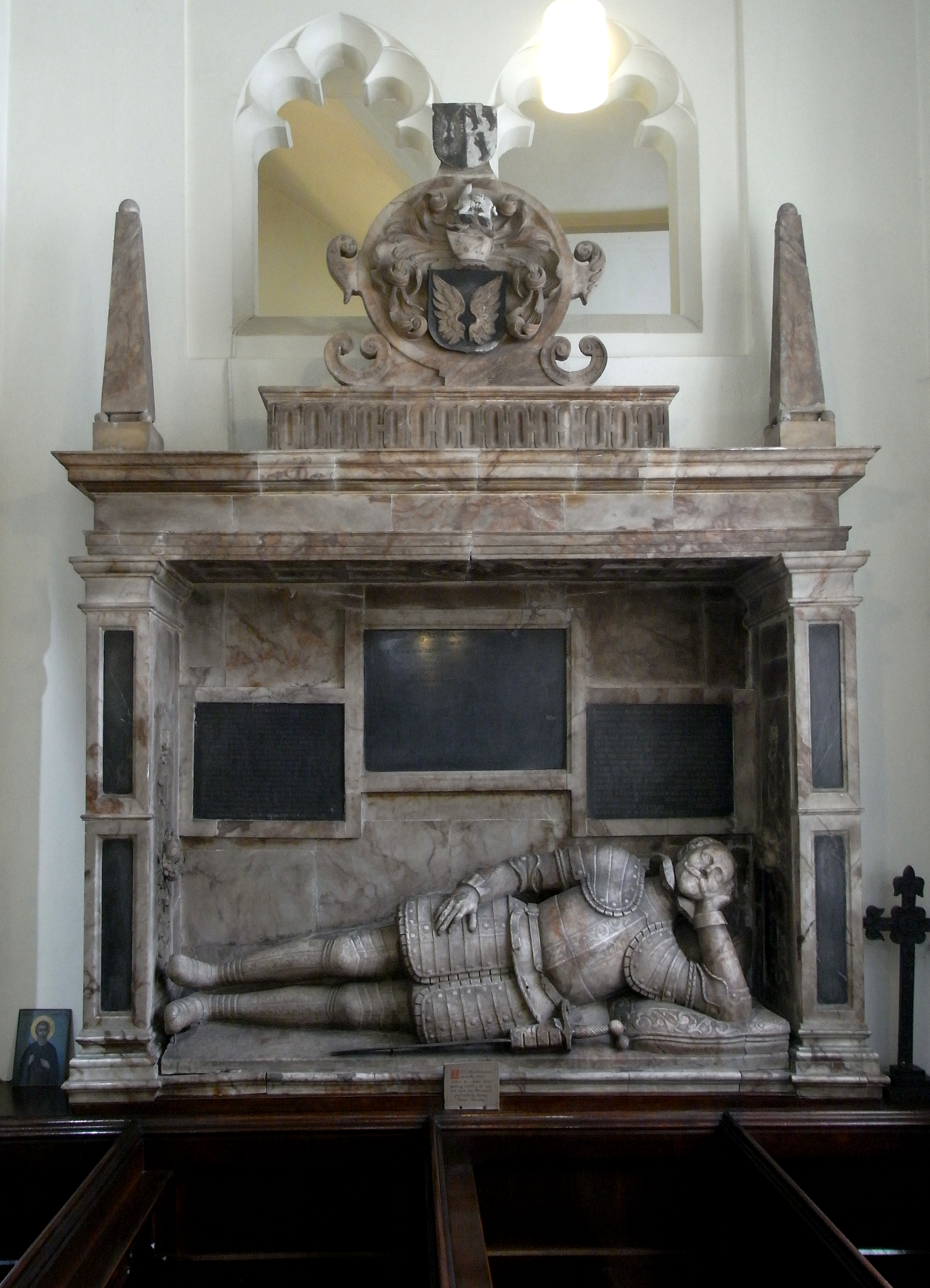
Monument to Sir Thomas Ridgeway Sr. (d.1598), at Tor Mohun Church, father of Thomas Ridgeway, 1s Earl of Londonderry

Ridgeway died in London in 1631, and was buried in the south aisle of the parish church of Tor Mohun, Devonshire, where as a young man he had erected a grand monument with an effigy of his father adorned with three inscribed tablets to the memory of his father and grandfather.

Ridgeway married Cicely (sometime maid of honour to Queen Elizabeth), coheiress of Henry Macwilliam. His brother-in-law by marriage, John Stanhope, 1st Baron Stanhope, was the nephew of Anne Stanhope, Duchess of Somerset. The couple had three sons and two daughters :

Robert Ridgeway, who married Elizabeth Weston, daughter of Sir Simon Weston, and succeeded him as the 2nd Earl of Londonderry. Elizabeth Weston was cousin of Thomas Yale Sr., of the Yale family who went to America with Gov. Theophilus Eaton, and the niece of Chancellor David Yale.

Cassandra Ridgeway, who married Sir Francis Willoughby in 1610, son of Sir Percival Willoughby of Wollaton Hall in Nottingham. Their son, Francis Willughby, became the father of the Duchess of Chandos, Cassandra Willoughby of Wanstead Hall, later of Wanstead House. Francis's second son, Thomas Willoughby, 1st Baron Middleton, ended up inheriting Wollaton Hall and Middleton Hall.

Other children of Ridgeway and Cicely included Edward, Macwilliam — and another daughter —Mary, who died in her infancy.

The peerage became extinct on the death of Robert Ridgeway, fourth Earl of Londonderry, in 1714. The title passed to his son-in-law Thomas Pitt, 1st Earl of Londonderry, son of Madras governor Thomas Pitt.

Peerage of Ireland
| New creation | Earl of Londonderry; 1622–1632 | Succeeded by Robert Ridgeway |
Baronetage of England
| New creation | Baronet (of Torrington); 1611–1632 | Succeeded by Robert Ridgeway |
