= Ridgeway Pitt, 3rd Earl of Londonderry =

British politician and Irish and British peer

Arms of Pitt: Sable, a fesse chequy argent and azure between three bezants

Ridgeway Pitt, 3rd Earl of Londonderry (1722 – 1765) of Soldon in the parish of Holsworthy in North Devon, was a British politician and peer.

== Origins ==
He was the younger son of Thomas Pitt, 1st Earl of Londonderry and was a first cousin of William Pitt, 1st Earl of Chatham ("Pitt the Elder"), twice prime minister of Great Britain.

== Career ==
His older brother, Thomas Pitt, 2nd Earl of Londonderry (1717-1734), died in a riding accident in 1734, when Ridgeway succeeded to his titles. In 1740 he was admitted to St John's College, Cambridge. He took his seat in the Irish House of Lords on 29 October 1743. As his title was in the Peerage of Ireland, he was not barred from election to the House of Commons of Great Britain and sat as a Member of Parliament for the rotten borough of Camelford in Cornwall between 1747 and 1754.

== Death ==
Londonderry never married. Upon his death, his titles became extinct.

Parliament of Great Britain
Preceded by The Earl of Inchiquin	Member of Parliament for Camelford; 1747–1754	Succeeded by John Lade
Peerage of Ireland
Preceded by Thomas Pitt	Earl of Londonderry; 1734–1765	Extinct
