= Thomas Pitt, 1st Earl of Londonderry =

British politician and soldier, Irish peer

Thomas Innes Pitt, 1st Earl of Londonderry
- Arms of Pitt: Sable, a fesse chequy argent and azure between three bezants
- Born: c. 1688
- Died: September 12, 1729 (aged 40–41); St. Kitts, Leeward Islands
- Education: Mr Meure's academy at Soho Square
- Occupations: British Army officer, speculator, Whig politician
- Title: Earl of Londonderry; Baron Londonderry; Viscount Gallen-Ridgeway
- Term: 1728–1729
- Predecessor: John Hart
- Successor: William Cosby (acting)
- Spouse: Lady Frances Ridgeway
- Children: Thomas Pitt, 2nd Earl of Londonderry (1717–1734); Ridgeway Pitt, 3rd Earl of Londonderry (1722–1765); Lucy Pitt (married Pierce Meyrick)
- Parent(s): Thomas Pitt and Jane Innes
- Relatives: Nephew: William Pitt, 1st Earl of Chatham ("Pitt the Elder"); Great-nephew: William Pitt the Younger

Thomas Innes Pitt, 1st Earl of Londonderry (c. 1688 – 12 September 1729) was a British Army officer, speculator and Whig politician who sat in the House of Commons from 1713 to 1728. He served as Governor of the Leeward Islands from 1728 to his death in 1729.

== Origins ==
He was the second son of Thomas Pitt (1653-1726) of Boconnoc in Cornwall, a wealthy merchant and President of Madras, by his wife Jane Innes, a daughter of James Innes. His nephew was William Pitt, 1st Earl of Chatham ("Pitt the Elder"), the father of William Pitt the Younger, both prime ministers of Great Britain. His father had been born at Blandford Forum in Dorset, the son of the Reverend John Pitt, rector of Blandford St Mary.

== Career ==
He attended Mr Meure's academy at Soho Square in London from 1703 to 1706. In 1708 he joined the army and served as an ensign in the 9th Foot until April 1709. He was then a captain in Killigrew's Dragoons until February 1715.

In the 1713 general election Pitt was returned as a Whig Member of Parliament for Wilton, in Wiltshire, a rotten borough owned by his father. He voted against the expulsion of Richard Steele.

The earldom of Londonderry held by his father-in-law Robert Ridgeway, 4th Earl of Londonderry had become extinct on the latter's death in 1714. In 1719 the Londonderry title was revived for Pitt who was created Baron Londonderry in the Peerage of Ireland. Seven years later the earldom was also revived when he was created Viscount Gallen-Ridgeway and Earl of Londonderry, again in the Peerage of Ireland.

At the 1715 general election he was returned again for Wilton and voted regularly with the Administration. He became Colonel of the Princess of Wales's Own Regiment of Horse in 1715 and served in the Jacobite Rebellion. He was said to have lost over £50,000 in the South Sea Bubble. He was returned again for Wilton at the 1722 general election. He became Colonel of Prince George of Denmark's Regiment in 1726. At the 1727 general election he was returned as a Member of Parliament for the notorious rotten borough of Old Sarum in Wiltshire. In 1728 he was appointed Governor of the Leeward Islands and vacated his seat in the House of Commons.

== Marriage and children ==
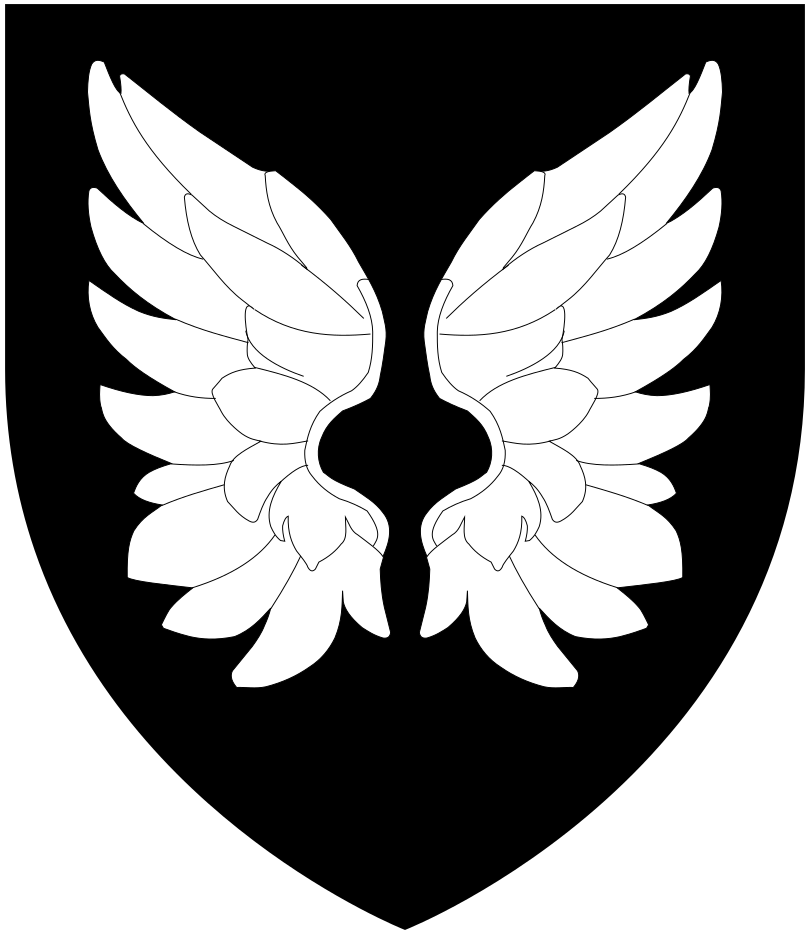
Arms of Ridgeway: Sable, a pair of wings conjoined and elevated argent

On 10 March 1717, he married Lady Frances Ridgeway (d.18 May 1772), the younger of the two daughters and co-heiresses of Robert Ridgeway, 4th Earl of Londonderry (also "Lord Baron of Gallen Ridgeway") (d.1714) of Tor Mohun in Devon. In 1726 Pitt was created Earl of Londonderry in the title's second creation, which his great-nephew Thomas Pitt, 1st Baron Camelford characterised as "he bought the honours that were extinct in her father". Lady Frances inherited the estate of Cudworth in Yorkshire, and in December 1732, having survived her first husband Thomas Pitt, remarried to Robert Graham, of South Warnborough, Hampshire. By his wife, Pitt had two sons and one daughter:

- Thomas Pitt, 2nd Earl of Londonderry (1717-1734), eldest son and heir, who died from a fall from his horse, aged 17.
- Ridgeway Pitt, 3rd Earl of Londonderry (1722-1765), who succeeded his elder brother and died unmarried, aged 43, when all the honours became extinct.
- Lucy Pitt, who married Pierce Meyrick, the youngest son of Owen Meyrick of Bodorgan, Anglesey.

== Death and succession ==
He died on 12 September 1729, aged 41, at St. Kitts, Leeward Islands, after a year's service as Governor, and was buried in the family vault at Blandford, Dorset. He was succeeded in his peerages by his eldest son Thomas Pitt, 2nd Earl of Londonderry.

== Sources ==
- Barker, George Fisher Russell, biography of "Pitt, Thomas (1688?-1729)", Dictionary of National Biography, 1885–1900, Volume 45

Parliament of Great Britain
| Preceded by Charles Mompesson; Peter Bathurst | Member of Parliament for Wilton; 1713–1727; With: John London 1713–1722; Robert Sawyer Herbert 1722–1727 | Succeeded by Robert Sawyer Herbert; Thomas Martin |
| Preceded by John Pitt; George Pitt | Member of Parliament for Old Sarum; 1727–1728; With: Thomas Pitt 1727–1728; Matthew St Quintin 1728 | Succeeded by Matthew St Quintin; Thomas Harrison |
Military offices
| Preceded by John Bland | Colonel of The Princess of Wales's Own Regiment of Horse; 1715–1726 | Succeeded by The Duke of Argyll |
| Preceded by Sir Charles Wills | Colonel of Prince George of Denmark's Regiment; 1726–1729 | Succeeded by William Tatton |
Political offices
| Preceded by John Hart | Governor of the Leeward Islands; 1728–1729 | Succeeded by William Cosby (acting) |
Peerage of Ireland
| New creation | Earl of Londonderry; 1726–1729 | Succeeded by Thomas Pitt |
| New creation | Baron Londonderry; 1719–1729 | Succeeded by Thomas Pitt |
