= Earl of Londonderry =

Title in the peerage of Ireland

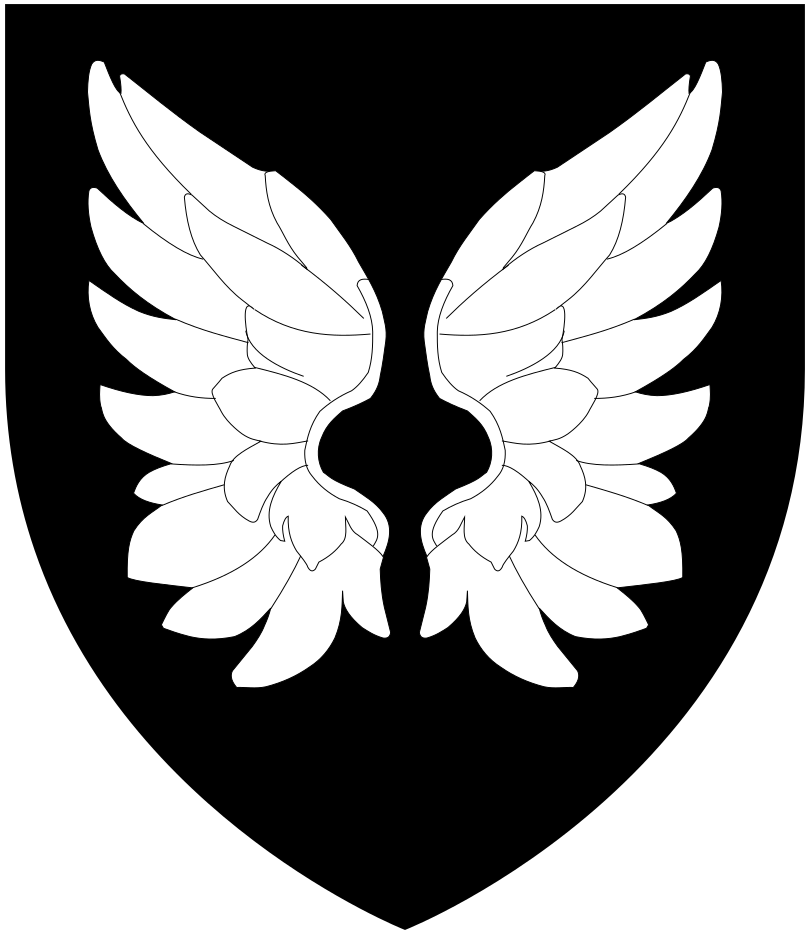
Arms of Ridgeway, Earls of Londonderry: Sable, a pair of wings conjoined and elevated argent

Arms of Pitt, Earls of Londonderry: Sable, a fesse chequy argent and azure between three bezants

Arms of Stewart, Earls and Marquesses of Londonderry: Or, a bend counter-compony argent and azure between two lions rampant gules

Earl of Londonderry is a title that has been created three times in the Peerage of Ireland. The first creation came in 1622 in favour of Thomas Ridgeway, 1st Baron Ridgeway, who served as Treasurer of Ireland and was involved in the colonisation of Ulster. He had already been created a Baronet, of Torrington in the County of Devon, in 1611, Lord Ridgeway, Baron of Gallen-Ridgeway, in the Peerage of Ireland, in 1616, and was made Viscount Gallen-Ridgeway at the same time as he was granted the earldom, also in the Peerage of Ireland. The titles became extinct on the death of his great-grandson, the fourth Earl, in 1714.

The second creation came in 1726 in favour of the soldier and politician Thomas Pitt, 1st Baron Londonderry. He had already been created Baron Londonderry in 1719 and was made Viscount Gallen-Ridgeway at the same time as he was granted the earldom, also in the Peerage of Ireland. He was the husband of Lady Frances Ridgeway, daughter and heiress of the fourth Earl of the first creation. A member of the prominent Pitt family, he was the uncle of William Pitt, 1st Earl of Chatham. His younger son, the third Earl (who succeeded his elder brother), represented Camelford in Parliament. The titles became extinct on his death in 1765.

The third creation came in 1796 in favour of Robert Stewart, 1st Viscount Castlereagh, already created Baron Londonderry in 1789. He was created Marquess of Londonderry in 1816. See the latter title for more information on this creation.

== Earls of Londonderry; First creation (1622) ==
- Thomas Ridgeway, 1st Earl of Londonderry (c. 1565–1631)
- Robert Ridgeway, 2nd Earl of Londonderry (died 1641)
- Weston Ridgeway, 3rd Earl of Londonderry (1620–1672)
- Robert Ridgeway, 4th Earl of Londonderry (died 1714)

== Earls of Londonderry; Second creation (1726) ==
- Thomas Pitt, 1st Earl of Londonderry (c.1688-1729)
- Thomas Pitt, 2nd Earl of Londonderry (1717-1734) (son)
- Ridgeway Pitt, 3rd Earl of Londonderry (1722–1765) (brother)

== Earls of Londonderry; Third creation (1796) ==
- see Marquess of Londonderry

== See also ==
- Earl of Chatham
- Baron Camelford

Baronetage of England
Preceded by Devereux Baronets	Ridgeway Baronets; 25 November 1611	Succeeded by Sandys Baronets
