= Augher =

Village in County Tyrone, Northern Ireland

Coordinates: 54.433°N 7.15°W

Augher: Irish: Eochair
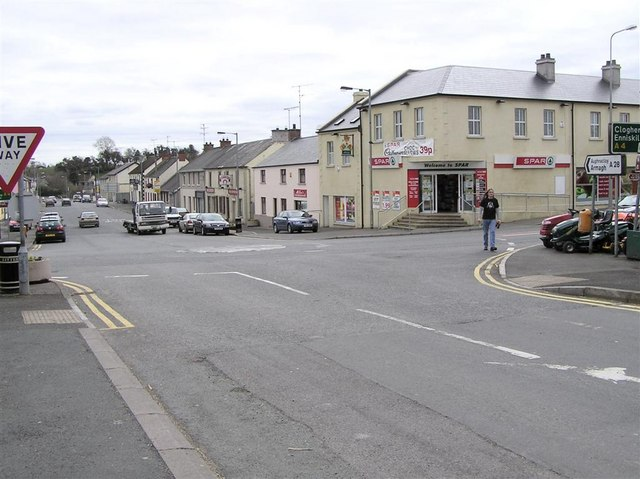
- Main Street, at A4 junction

- Location within Northern Ireland
- Population: 391 (2021 census)
  - Belfast: 58 miles (103 km)
  - Dublin: 99 miles (160 km)
- District: Mid Ulster
- County: County Tyrone
- Country: Northern Ireland
- Sovereign state: United Kingdom
- Post town: AUGHER
- Postcode district: BT77
- Dialling code: 028, +44 28
- UK Parliament: Fermanagh and South Tyrone

Augher (from Irish: Eochair meaning "edge/border") is a small village in south County Tyrone, Northern Ireland. It lies just 6 miles to the border with County Monaghan and is 16 miles south of Dungannon. It is situated in the historic barony of Clogher and the civil parish of Clogher. The 2021 census recorded a population of 391.

== Historical ==
By the time of the Nine Years' War Augher was important enough to be used as a garrison town by the forces of Lord Mountjoy, Elizabeth I's Lord Deputy of Ireland, to disrupt the army of the Earl of Tyrone.

In 1613, after the war and as part of the Plantation of Ulster an area of 315 acres (127.5 ha) around Augher was given to Sir Thomas Ridgeway who had been the Treasurer at War for Ireland. The land grant was strict about what the Undertaker i.e. Ridgway, could do with the land in terms of who had to be settled there and what provisions had to be given to the settlers. Ridgway was successful in developing the town that within two years it awarded a borough charter by James I.

By 1630 the ownership of Augher had passed to Sir James Erskine and during the Irish Rebellion of 1641 the castle was successfully defended against rebel attack. In retaliation the rebels massacred all the English inhabitants in the area.

On the death of Sir James Erskine, Augher Castle and the estate passed into the ownership of the Richardson family who retained the estate well into the 19th century. The castle itself burnt down in 1689 but was restored and extended in 1832. Spur Royal Castle stands to this day.

Under the borough charter, Augher returned two members of parliament to the Irish Parliament, a practice that continued until the abolition of the parliament in 1801. The borough was by the time of the abolition of parliament owned by John Hamilton, 1st Marquess of Abercorn and when the parliament was abolished he received £15,000 compensation for the loss of the electoral rights of Augher and Strabane – the other borough he owned. Also abolished at the same time was the civil court established under the charter.

== Transport ==
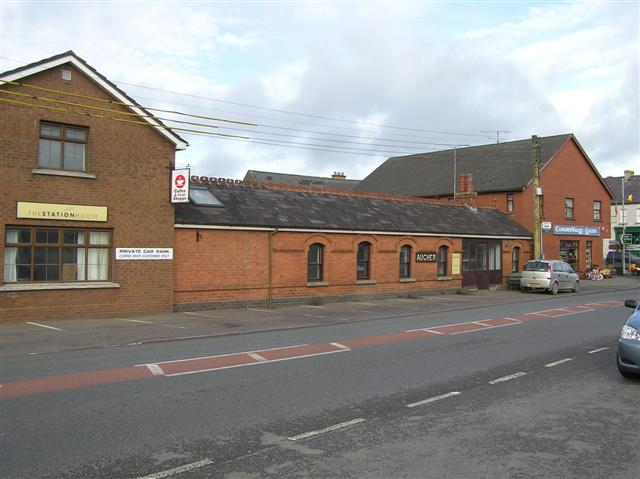
The old railway station

Augher Railway Station was opened on 2 May 1887 by the Clogher Valley Railway and was closed on 1 January 1942. The original station building became a coffee shop known as Rosamunde's. After a period of being closed, the now Augher Station House Cafe came under new ownership, was refurbished and reopened once more.

== People ==
- John Hughes, first Archbishop of Roman Catholic Diocese of New York, born Annaloghan townland, near Augher
- Fergal McCann - former coach of the Tyrone senior football team. After finishing his player career with Augher St Macartan's GAC, he spent 10 seasons as trainer and coach of the Tyrone senior football team. During that period the team won their second and third All-Ireland Championship titles.
- Eugene McKenna – former Tyrone Gaelic Football Captain in the 1980s and joint manager from 1999 to 2002 was from Augher. He collected three Ulster Senior Championship medals as a player, and represented his province in the Irish Interprovincial Railway Cup Tournament on several occasions.

== Schools in the area ==
Schools in the area include;

- Augher Central Primary School
- Carntall Primary School
- Saint Macartan's Convent School
- Saint Patrick's Primary School Aughadarragh
- St Ciaran's College Ballygawley
- Fivemiletown College

== Sport ==
Augher St. Macartan's GAC is the local Gaelic Athletic Association club. Augher Stars is a local association football club.

== See also ==
- List of towns and villages in Northern Ireland
- Augher (Parliament of Ireland constituency)
