= Torre Abbey =

Church in Torquay, UK

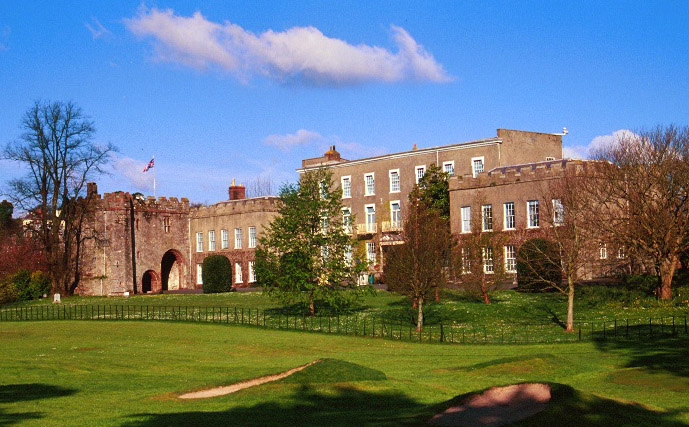
- Exterior view

- Location within Devon

Monastery information
- Order: Premonstratensian
- Established: 1196
- Disestablished: 1539

Architecture
- Heritage designation: Grade I listed

Site
- Location: Torquay, United Kingdom
- Coordinates: 50.464°N 3.541°W
- Public access: yes
- Website: www.torre-abbey.org.uk

Torre Abbey is a historic building and art gallery in Torquay, Devon, which lies in the South West of England. It was founded in 1196 as a monastery for Premonstratensian canons, and is now the best-preserved medieval monastery in Devon and Cornwall. In addition to its medieval and Georgian rooms, Torre Abbey is known for the formal gardens on Abbey Park and Meadows, for the third largest art collection in the county of Devon and for regular exhibitions by contemporary artists.

== History ==
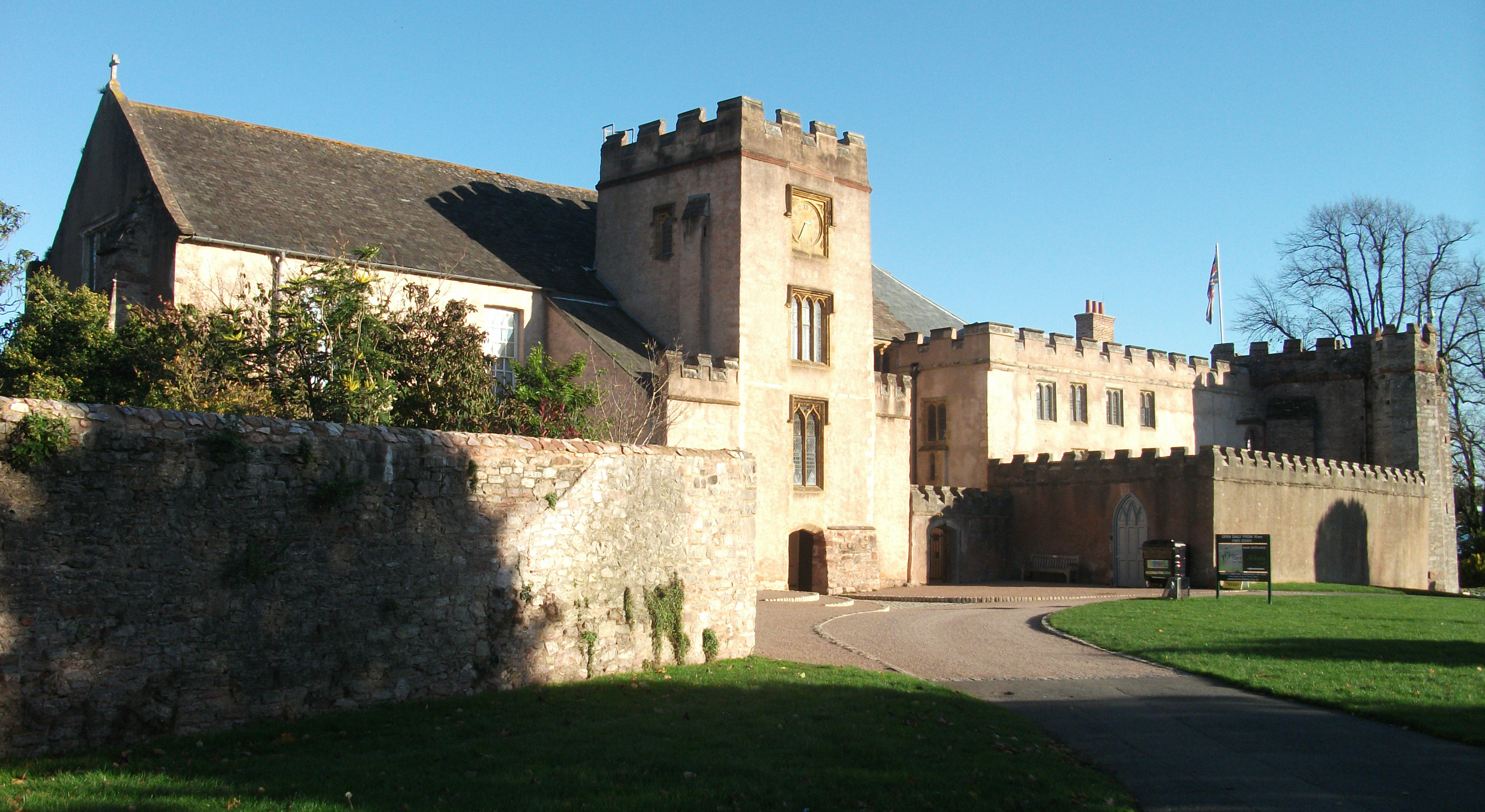
Torre Abbey, side entrance

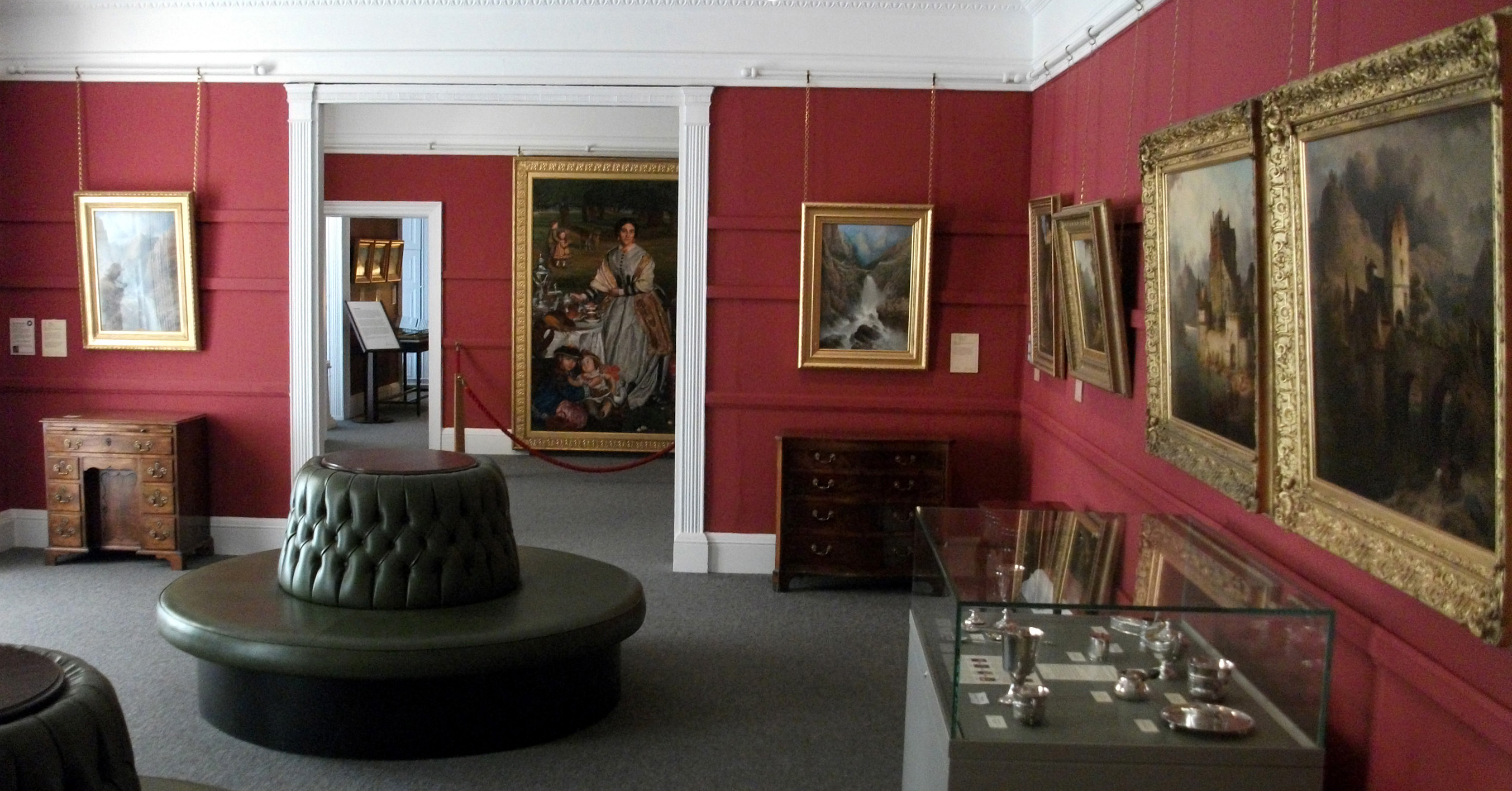
19th-century paintings in the permanent exhibition

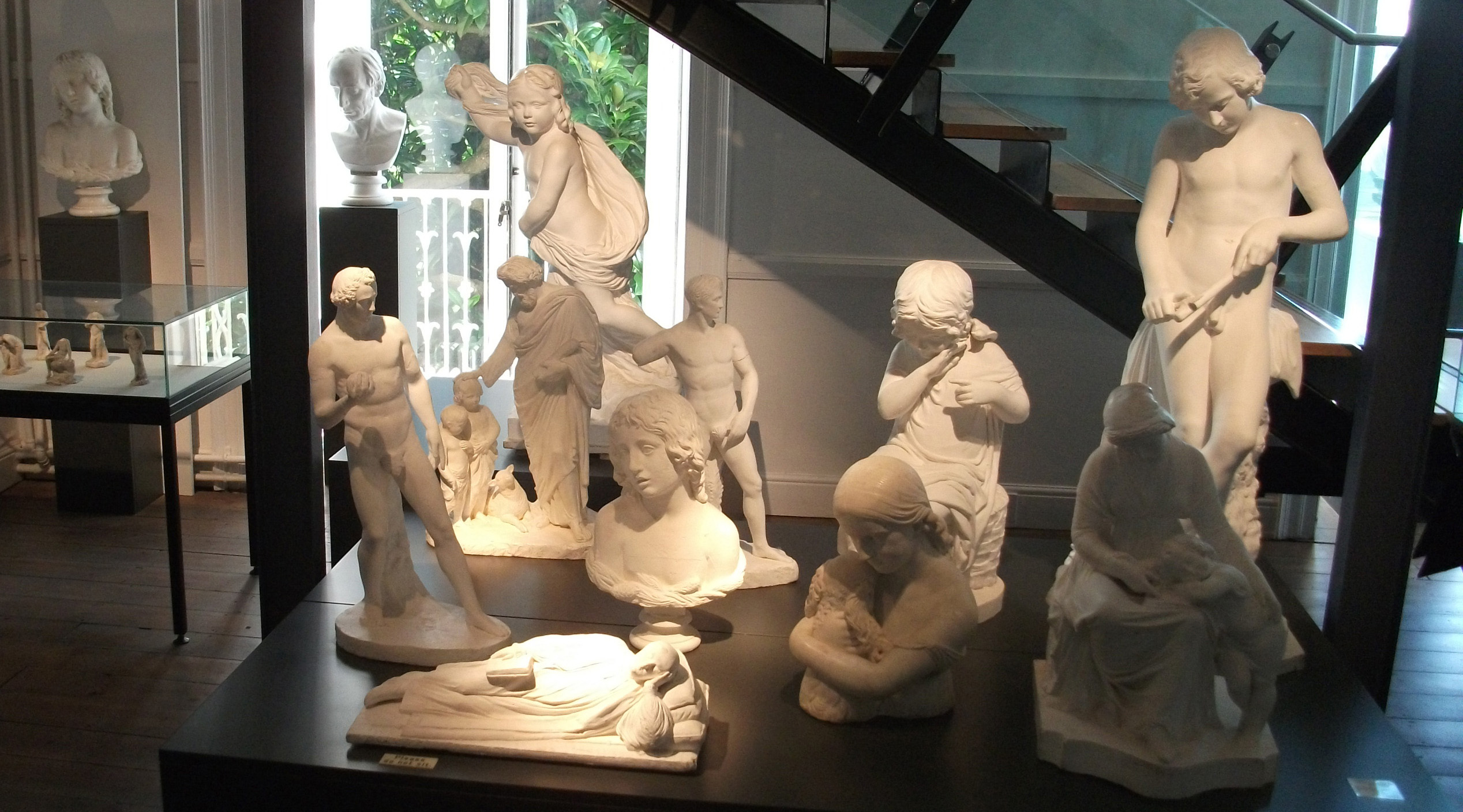
Sculptures of Frederick Thrupp

In 1196 six Premonstratensian canons from the Welbeck Abbey in Nottinghamshire founded Torre Abbey when William Brewer, lord of the manor of Torre, gave them land. By 1536 the Abbey's annual income made it the wealthiest of all the Premonstratensian houses in England. The canons surrendered to King Henry VIII's commissioner in 1539 at the Dissolution of the Monasteries and immediately thereafter in 1539 a 21-year lease of the site and demesne of Torre Abbey was acquired by Sir Hugh I Pollard (fl.1535, 1545), lord of the manor of King's Nympton, Sheriff of Devon in 1535/6 and Recorder of Barnstaple in 1545. In 1543 Pollard acquired the freehold from John St. Leger (d.1596) of Annery, who had himself acquired it in 1543 with other lands from the king in exchange for some lands and payment of a cash balance. Dissolution resulted in a widescale demolition of the church and east range, and all items of value, including the lead from the roofs, were taken. The south and west ranges were mostly unscathed and, in 1598, were converted into a house for Thomas Ridgeway MP. After a succession of various owners, the house became the possession of the Cary family in 1662. The house continued in the possession of the Cary family until 1930 when the mansion and grounds were sold by Commander Henry Cary to Torquay Borough Council, although the family continued to own the surrounding estate and the (notional) lordship of the manor of Tor Mohun. Monuments to various members of the Cary family survive in St Saviour's Church. The building has since been used as a municipal art gallery; the mayor's parlour and, during World War II, it was used by the Royal Air Force. Torre Abbey is owned and managed by Torbay Council. After a £6.5 million refurbishment made possible by grants from the Heritage Lottery Fund, English Heritage and the Friends of Torre Abbey, Torre Abbey reopened in July 2008.

== Buildings ==
The main abbey comprises two Grade I listed buildings. Though the church is little more than a ruin, the west and south sides of the cloisters are still standing. The gatehouse dates from around 1380, and the barrel vault above the chapel, formerly the guest hall, dates from the 15th century. The tithe barn, built along with the abbey in the early thirteenth century, is known as The Spanish Barn after it was used for fourteen days to hold 397 prisoners of war from the Spanish Armada in 1588. Around 1740 the buildings underwent extensive alterations, giving them a Georgian remodelling that is mostly intact today. The Cary family invested in further reconstructions throughout the 19th century, including the construction of a small brewery.

St Michael's Chapel on the summit of Chapel Hill, in Torquay may have belonged to the Abbey.

== Art exhibitions ==
The permanent exhibitions focus on paintings of the 19th century including pictures of national standing as William Blake and the Pre-Raphaelite works of Edward Burne-Jones (The Planets, series of cartoons) or William Holman Hunt (The Children's Holiday). Torre Abbey also houses the contents of the studio of Frederick Thrupp, the largest collection by an individual Victorian sculptor to survive in the UK. The Abbey also provides a programme of contemporary art exhibitions, including Antony Gormley's Field for the British Isles in 2009 and Damien Hirst's Mother and Child, Divided in 2010. The annual Torre Abbey Contemporary Open exhibition (TACO) provides a showcase for artists from the South West.

== Miscellaneous ==
During his time in command of the Channel Fleet between 1800 and 1801 Admiral John Jervis, 1st Earl of St Vincent lived at the Abbey when he was too ill to remain with the fleet.
