= Errigal-Trough =

Errigal-Trough was a village that spanned County Tyrone and County Monaghan. Samuel Lewis described it in 1837 as "a parish, partly in the barony of CLOGHER, county of TYRONE, but chiefly in that of TROUGH, county of MONAGHAN, and province of ULSTER, 3 miles (S.S.W.) from Aughnacloy, on the road to Emyvale, and on the river Blackwater; containing 9321 inhabitants."

== Historical description ==
It comprised 24,792¼ statute acres, according to the Ordnance Survey, of which 21,174¼ are in Monaghan, and 102¼ are under water; 21,834 acres are applotted under the tithe act. About four-fifths of the land are arable and pasture, and there is a great deal of mountain land used for grazing, and some bog on the western boundary: agriculture is improving. There is abundance of limestone and sandstone; and coal is supposed to exist in the Sleabea mountains, though it has not been worked. On the north-western confines of the parish is Lough More. A small factory for weaving linen was once erected here.
