= Register of Parks, Gardens and Demesnes of Special Historic Interest =

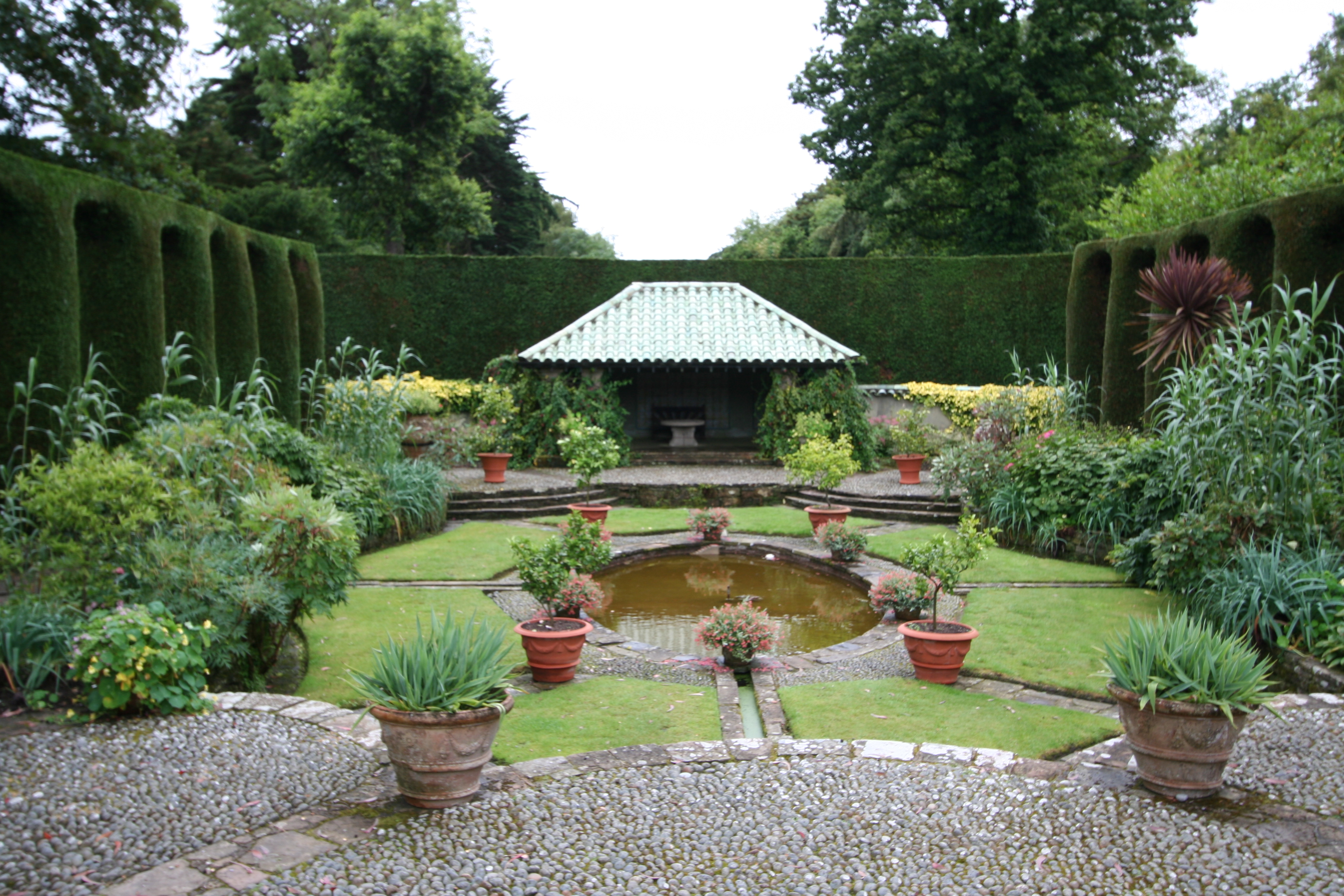
The gardens of Mount Stewart, County Down, are included on the Register

The Register of Parks, Gardens and Demesnes of Special Historic Interest is a listing of significant ornamental parks and gardens in Northern Ireland. It is maintained by the Northern Ireland Environment Agency (NIEA), an executive agency within the Department of the Environment of the Northern Ireland Executive.

== The Register ==
The register was developed from 1999, based on an inventory of over 700 sites complied in 1992. A series of ten inclusion criteria are applied, including the site's historic, horticultural, architectural and archaeological importance. The register includes 154 sites, together with 150 "supplementary sites". Registered sites are a material consideration in applications for planning permission.

== Other parts of the United Kingdom ==
Separate registers of parks, gardens and designed landscapes are maintained in the other countries of the United Kingdom:

- The Register of Historic Parks and Gardens of special historic interest in England is maintained by English Heritage
- The Cadw/ICOMOS Register of Parks and Gardens of Special Historic Interest in Wales is maintained by Cadw
- The Inventory of Gardens and Designed Landscapes in Scotland is maintained by Historic Environment Scotland
