= List of A roads in Northern Ireland =

The following is a list of A roads in Northern Ireland. As of 2023, A roads made up 8.9% of all roads in Northern Ireland.

Road	From	To	Notes
A1	Belfast	Killeen	Via Lisburn and Newry. Forming part of the main route from Belfast to Dublin. Becoming the N1 at the border, joining onto the Republic's M1 before Dundalk.
A2	Derry	Newry	Northern Irish coastal road. Including routes such as Belfast-Bangor, Belfast-Carrickfergus, Newry-Warrenpoint and Derry-Limavady
A3	Lisburn	Cavan	Via Craigavon and Armagh. Becomes the N12 at Middletown until Monaghan, then the N54 to Cavan via southern Fermanagh.
A4	Craigavon (Portadown)	Belcoo	Via Dungannon and Enniskillen. Becomes the N16 at the border towards Sligo.
A5	Derry	Aughnacloy	Via Strabane and Omagh. Becomes the N2 after the Aughnacloy at the border towards Dublin.
A6	Derry	Belfast	Via Dungiven, Antrim and Glengormley.
A7	Carryduff	Downpatrick	Via Saintfield. Stemming off the A24, it forms most of the main road from Belfast to Downpatrick.
A8	Glengormley	Larne	Via Ballynure. Stemming from the A6.
~~A9~~ - ~~A10~~			Unused
A11			Belfast Inner Ring Road
A12	Belfast (Broadway)	Belfast (York Street)	Westlink dual-carriageway in Belfast
~~A13~~ - ~~A19~~			Unused
A20	Belfast (Bridge End)	Portaferry	Via Dundonald and Newtownards
A21	Bangor	Ballynahinch	Via Newtownards and Comber and Ballygowan
A22	Dundonald	Downpatrick	Via Comber, Killinchy and Killyleagh.
A23	Belfast	Ballygowan	Via Moneyreagh.
A24	Belfast (Cromac Street)	Clough	Via Carryduff and Ballynahinch. Forms the greater part of the route from Belfast to Newcastle, and Kilkeel.
A25	Strangford	Altnamackan	Via Downpatrick, Clogh, Rathfriland, Newry and Newtownhamilton. Becomes the R182 at the border and carries on towards Castleblaney.
A26	Coleraine	Banbridge	Via Coleraine, Ballymena, Antrim, Moira, Craigavon (Lurgan) and Warringstown.
A27	Newry	Craigavon (Portadown)	
A28	Newry (Sheepsbridge)	Aughnacloy	Via Markethill, Armagh and Caledon.
A29	Portrush	Ballymaclosha	Via Maghera, Cookstown, Dungannon, Armagh, Keady and Newtownhamilton. At the border it becomes the R177 and carries on towards Dundalk.
A30	Lisburn	Glenavy	
A31	Moneymore	Castledawson	Form part of the route connecting Cookstown to Belfast.
A32	Omagh	Swanlinbar	Via Enniskillen. Becomes the N87 at the border.
A33	Newtownbutler	Republic of Ireland border west of Clones	Became a portion of a rerouted A34 by the 1970s.
A34	Maguiresbridge	Clones	Via Lisnaskea and Newtownbutler. Becomes the R183 road at the border
A35	Irvinestown	Pettigo	Via Kesh. Becomes the R234 at the border.
A36	Ballykeel	Ballyrickard	Via Moorfields and Killwaughter. Forms the main route from Larne to Ballymena.
A37 (Co. Londonderry)	Macosquin	Limavady	Part of the Coleraine to Derry route.(North)
A37 (Co. Armagh)	Dundalk	Castleblayney	Only a short stretch of this route actually lies within Northern Ireland. The rest of the route being called the N53.(South)
A38	Strabane	Lifford	Less than a mile lies in Northern Ireland crossing the River Foyle and divides into the N14 to Letterkenny and N15 to Sligo.
A39	Maguiresbridge	Lisnaskea	Became a portion of a rerouted A34.
A40	Derry city centre	Carrigans	West of the River Foyle, becomes the R236 at the border which carries on towards Raphoe.
~~A41~~			Unused
A42	Maghera	Carnlough	Via Portglenone, Ahoghill, Galgorm, Ballymena and Broughshane.
A43	Ballymena	Glenarriff	Via Martinstown.
A44	Ballycastle	A26 north of Cloughmills	Via Armoy.
A45	Granville	Tamnamore	Via Dungannon and Coalisland
A46	Enniskillen	Belleek	Becomes the N3 at the border which carries on towards Ballyshannon.
A47	Enniskillen (Trory)	Belleek	Via Killadeas, Lisnarick, Kesh, Boa Island and Leggs.
A48	Newtownards	Donaghadee	Via Six Road Ends.
A49	Lisburn	Ballynahinch	
A50	Craigavon (Portadown)	Newcastle	Via Gilford, Banbridge, Katesbridge and Castlewellan.
A51	Gilford	Armagh	Via Tandragee and Hamiltonsbawn.
A52	Belfast (Carlisle Circus)	Crumlin	Via Nutt's Corner.
A53	Cookstown	Orritor	Declassified.
A54	Castledawson	Coleraine	Via Bellaghy and Kilrea.
A55			Belfast Outer Ring Road
~~A56~~			Unused
A57	Belfast International Airport	Ballynure	Via Templepatrick and Ballyclare. Forms part of the main route connecting the airport with Belfast City and Larne.
~~A58~~ - ~~A67~~			Unused
A68	High Street, Belfast	York Road station, Belfast	via Corporation Street; now part of the A2 one-way system. It is unknown why the A68 number was chosen; an A5xx number (which were allocated to Belfast until the A505), the A56 (was and still is the lowest available number) or an A1x number (later allocated to central Belfast roads) would have been more logical.
~~A69~~ - ~~A75~~			Unused
A76	M1	Craigavon (Lurgan)	
~~A77~~ - ~~A96~~			Unused
A97			Number appears on 1940s maps; typo for the A37 running through Cullaville.
~~A98~~			Unused
A99	A3 Edward Street, Lurgan	A26/B3 in Lurgan	Millennium Way; one sign showed "A3", but this is incorrect.
A101	M1	Sprucefield, near Lisburn	
A211			Bridge Street and Newtownards Road in Comber, designated when the A21 Comber Bypass was opened in 2004
A221			Bridge Street and Newtownards Road in Comber, designated when the A21 Comber Bypass was opened in 2004. Officially known as A211, but signed as A221.
A371			Various roads in Limavady town centre, designated when the A37 Limavady Bypass was opened in 2004
A500	Donegall Street, Belfast	Whitla Street, Belfast	The northern section is now part of a rerouted A2 and the southern half unclassified.
A501	Belfast	A30 just east of Glenavy	
~~A502~~			Unused
A503	Donegall Square, Belfast	Shaftesbury Square, Belfast	via Howard Street and Great Victoria Street; former portions of the B38 and B23. Later became part of the A1 one-way system and is now part of the A1 and A11.
A504	Dundonald	Newtownbreda	Formerly a section of the B205 before it was upgraded as part of work to give Belfast an outer ring road. Now part of the A55.
A505	Omagh	Cookstown	Via Mountfield.
~~A506~~ - ~~A507~~			Unused
A508	Antrim	Rathbeg	via Belmont Road, Ballycraigy Road and Greystone Road (former B95); the section along Belmont Road is now part of a rerouted A6 and the remainder downgraded to Class II status: Ballycraigy Road is now the B518 and Greystone Road returned to the B95.
A509	Enniskillen	Belturbet	Becomes the N3 at the border after Derrylin.
A510	Belfast (Cromac Street)	Ballymacarrett (Albertbridge Road)	Formerly numbered as A20.
~~A511~~			Unused
A512			Old Golf Course link road in West Belfast and North Lisburn
A513	Ballymacash	Derriaghy	Lisburn Feeder Road
A514			Derry Ring Road (Crescent Link)
A515			Derry Ring Road (Foyle Bridge and Skeoge Link Road)
~~A516~~ - ~~A518~~			Unused
A519	Tonagh	Ballymacash	Distributor road in western Lisburn
A520	Ballymacash	Knockmore	Link between the A3 and the A519 in Western Lisburn
~~A521~~			Unused
A522	Dublin Road, Antrim	Belmont Road, Antrim	Former route of the A6 through Antrim town centre.
A523	Ballymena Town Centre	Ballee Roundabout, Ballymena	Former route of the A26 through Ballymena.
