= Republic of Ireland–United Kingdom border =

- A map showing the border

Characteristics
- Entities: Republic of Ireland, United Kingdom
- Length: 499 km (310 mi)

History
- Established: 3 May 1921; Government of Ireland Act 1920 (Partition of Ireland)
- Current shape: 7 December 1922; Northern Ireland opt out of the Free State
- Treaties: Anglo-Irish Treaty; Northern Ireland Protocol (as part of the Brexit Withdrawal Agreement)
- Notes: Open border not officially marked by either government

The Republic of Ireland–United Kingdom border, sometimes referred to as the Irish border or the British–Irish border, runs for 499 km (310 mi) from Lough Foyle in the north-west of Ireland to Carlingford Lough in the northeast, separating the Republic of Ireland from Northern Ireland.

Border markings are inconspicuous, in common with many inter-state borders in the European Union. As the two states share a Common Travel Area and (as of 2021) Northern Ireland (the only exception within the UK and only in some respects) and the Republic of Ireland are participants in the European Single Market, the border is essentially an open one, allowing free passage of people since 1923 and of goods since 1993. There are about 270 public roads that cross the border. Following the United Kingdom's exit from the European Union, this border is also the frontier between the EU and a non-member country. The Brexit withdrawal agreement commits all involved parties to maintaining an open border in Ireland, so that (in many respects) the trade frontier is the Irish Sea between the two islands. This de facto division of the United Kingdom is described, especially by Unionists, as "the Irish Sea border".

== Establishment ==
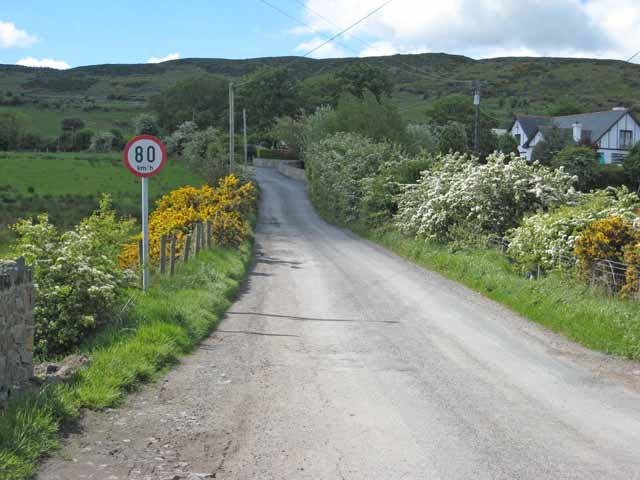
The border at Killeen (viewed from the UK side) marked only by a metric (km/h) speed limit sign

Originally intended as an internal boundary within the United Kingdom of Great Britain and Ireland, the border was created in 1921 under the United Kingdom Parliament's Government of Ireland Act 1920. Prior to this, a separatist Irish parliament had been established in Dublin, which did not recognise the Government of Ireland Act, and was actively engaged in the Irish War of Independence. The Act was intended to deliver Home Rule in Ireland, with separate parliaments for Southern Ireland (which included three of the nine counties of Ulster) and Northern Ireland. Six of the thirty-two counties of Ireland were assigned to Northern Ireland, and the rest of Ireland comprising 26 counties to Southern Ireland.

The conclusion of the Irish War of Independence, and the subsequent signing of the Anglo-Irish Treaty, led to the creation of the Irish Free State – a dominion established for the whole island of Ireland on 6 December 1922. The border became an international frontier after the Parliament of Northern Ireland exercised its right to opt out of the Free State on 7 December 1922. The partition of 1921 created only a provisional boundary; a Boundary Commission met in 1924–25 to fix a permanent border between the two jurisdictions "in accordance with the wishes of the inhabitants, so far as may be compatible with economic and geographic conditions". The manner in which the Boundary Commission clause was drafted in the Anglo-Irish Treaty was only explicit in its ambiguity. Amongst politicians in Southern Ireland, there was remarkably little attention paid to the clause during the debates on the Treaty. The Republican activist Seán MacEntee was a "lone voice" in warning that the commission would involve an exercise "in transferring from the jurisdiction of the Government of Northern Ireland certain people and certain districts which that Government cannot govern; and by giving instead to Northern Ireland, certain other districts—unionist districts of Counties Monaghan, Cavan and Donegal, so that not only under this Treaty are we going to partition Ireland, not only are we going to partition Ulster, but we are going to partition even the counties of Ulster."

The commission recommended parcels of land be transferred in both directions, primarily "in accordance with the wishes of the inhabitants". The data was partially leaked to the press in 1925. Westminster urged the commissioners to suppress the rest of the document, and so no exchanges of land ultimately took place. The full report was not published until 1969- which did eventually confirm the accuracy of the earlier leak. The interim boundary was formalised in December 1925 by an inter-government agreement that was ratified by the three parliaments in London, Dublin and Belfast, without changes from the 1920 demarcation lines. The border agreement was then lodged with the League of Nations on 8 February 1926, making it a matter of international law.

The Irish Free State was renamed Ireland (Irish: Éire) by the 1937 constitution, and the Republic of Ireland Act 1948 formally declared that the state was a republic with the official description Republic of Ireland while not changing its name, which remains Ireland.

== Customs and identity checks ==
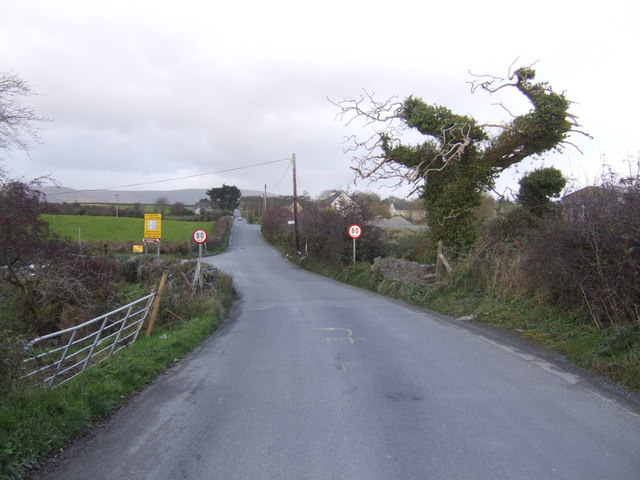
The border on the Lenamore Road, County Londonderry, Northern Ireland. The Republic of Ireland begins just in front of the speed signs and lies to the north of Northern Ireland at this location.

Customs controls were introduced on the frontier on 1 April 1923, shortly after the establishment of the Irish Free State. These controls were maintained, with varying degrees of severity, until 1 January 1993, when systematic customs checks were abolished between European Community member states as part of the single market. There are no longer any operational customs posts along either side of the border. Except during a brief period during World War II, it has never been necessary for Irish or British citizens to produce a passport to cross the border. However, during the 1970s troubles, security forces regularly asked travellers for identification.

=== Military checkpoints ===
During the Troubles in Northern Ireland, there were British military checkpoints on main border crossings and UK security forces made the remaining crossings impassable. By about 2005, in phase with implementation of the 1998 Good Friday Agreement, the last remaining controls were definitively removed.

=== Dropped proposals to reinstate border controls ===
In October 2007, details began to emerge of a British Government plan that might end the Common Travel Area encompassing the United Kingdom and Ireland (and also the Isle of Man and Channel Islands) in 2009, possibly creating an anomalous position for Northern Ireland in the process. In a statement to Dáil Éireann, the Irish Taoiseach Bertie Ahern assured the House that "British authorities have no plans whatsoever to introduce any controls on the land border between North and South. I want to make that clear. All they are looking at is increased cross-border cooperation, targeting illegal immigrants." This immediately raised concerns north of the border. Jim Allister, a former member of the Democratic Unionist Party and then a Member of the European Parliament, told The Times that it would be "intolerable and preposterous if citizens of the UK had to present a passport to enter another part of the UK".

In July 2008, the UK and Irish governments announced their intent to resume controls over their common border and the Common Travel Area in general. Each proposed to introduce detailed passport control over travellers from the other state, where travel is by air or sea. However, the land border will be 'lightly controlled'. In a joint statement, Jacqui Smith, the British Home Secretary, and Dermot Ahern, the Irish Justice Minister, said:

It is crucial that our two countries work closely together to ensure our borders are stronger than ever. Both governments fully recognise the particular circumstances of Northern Ireland. Both governments reaffirm that they have no plans to introduce fixed controls on either side of the Irish land border.

The Times reported that another consultation paper was to be published in the autumn of 2008 on whether people travelling between Northern Ireland and the rest of the United Kingdom should be subject to further checks.

One proposal is expected to suggest extending the electronic borders scheme, requiring travellers from Northern Ireland to provide their personal details in advance. This would mean residents of one part of the UK being treated differently from others when travelling within the country, something to which Unionists would object.

However, in 2011, the governments renewed the 'de facto' agreement.

=== The 2011 inter-government agreement ===
2011 marked the first public agreement between the UK and Irish governments concerning the maintenance of the Common Travel Area. Officially entitled the "Joint Statement Regarding Co-Operation on Measures to Secure the External Common Travel Area Border", it was signed in Dublin on 20 December 2011 by the UK's immigration minister, Damian Green and Ireland's Minister for Justice, Alan Shatter.

=== Traffic ===
The border is linked with 268 (often approximated as "up to 275") border crossing points. Every month approximately 177,000 lorries, 208,000 vans, and 1,850,000 cars cross the border. Around 30,000 people cross the border daily to commute.

== The Troubles ==
The Troubles in Northern Ireland required that attempts were made from the early 1970s until the late 1990s to enforce border controls. Many smaller cross-border roads were cratered or blockaded by the British Army with the intention of making them impassable to regular traffic. Bridges were also destroyed to prevent access at unauthorised border crossings (known officially as "unapproved roads"). In particular, the border area in south County Armagh was dominated by British Army surveillance posts. Derry, the second-largest city in Northern Ireland, is close to the border with County Donegal. This meant that there was a heavy security presence around the city, often impeding traffic and general movement between Derry City and County Donegal. Despite these measures, the border was simply too long and had too many minor access roads to enable control of all cross-border movements. British Prime minister Margaret Thatcher stated that there was "no way we can patrol the 500 miles [of border]". During the period, authorised crossing-points on the border remained open to civilian traffic in both directions at all times although vehicles and their occupants were subject to detailed searches while some crossing points were closed to vehicle traffic at night when customs posts were unstaffed.

Despite measures taken by the Irish government during the Troubles, Irish republican militants, including the Provisional Irish Republican Army (PIRA), had a measure of "safe haven" over the border. The PIRA also raised money in the Republic, mostly through bank robberies, and undertook "cross border raids".

Difficulty in patrolling parts of the border and large taxation/currency differences (particularly during the 1980s) led to widespread smuggling. However, greater European integration led to roughly similar tax rates on most items and easing of restrictions on cross-border trade. Smuggling nowadays is mostly limited to fuel, livestock and a seasonal trade in illegal fireworks, which are strictly regulated in Ireland – in both countries there are restrictions on the types which can be used and a licence is required to possess or use fireworks, but in Ireland such licences are seldom issued to private individuals.

While it still exists de jure, the border presents no impediments to traffic in either direction. The Common Travel Area between the UK and Ireland, EU integration and the demilitarisation of the border following the 1998 Good Friday Agreement resulted in an open border by default. Following the Northern Ireland peace process, military electronic surveillance and permanent vehicle checkpoints have been replaced by routine PSNI patrols.

== Status post-Brexit ==
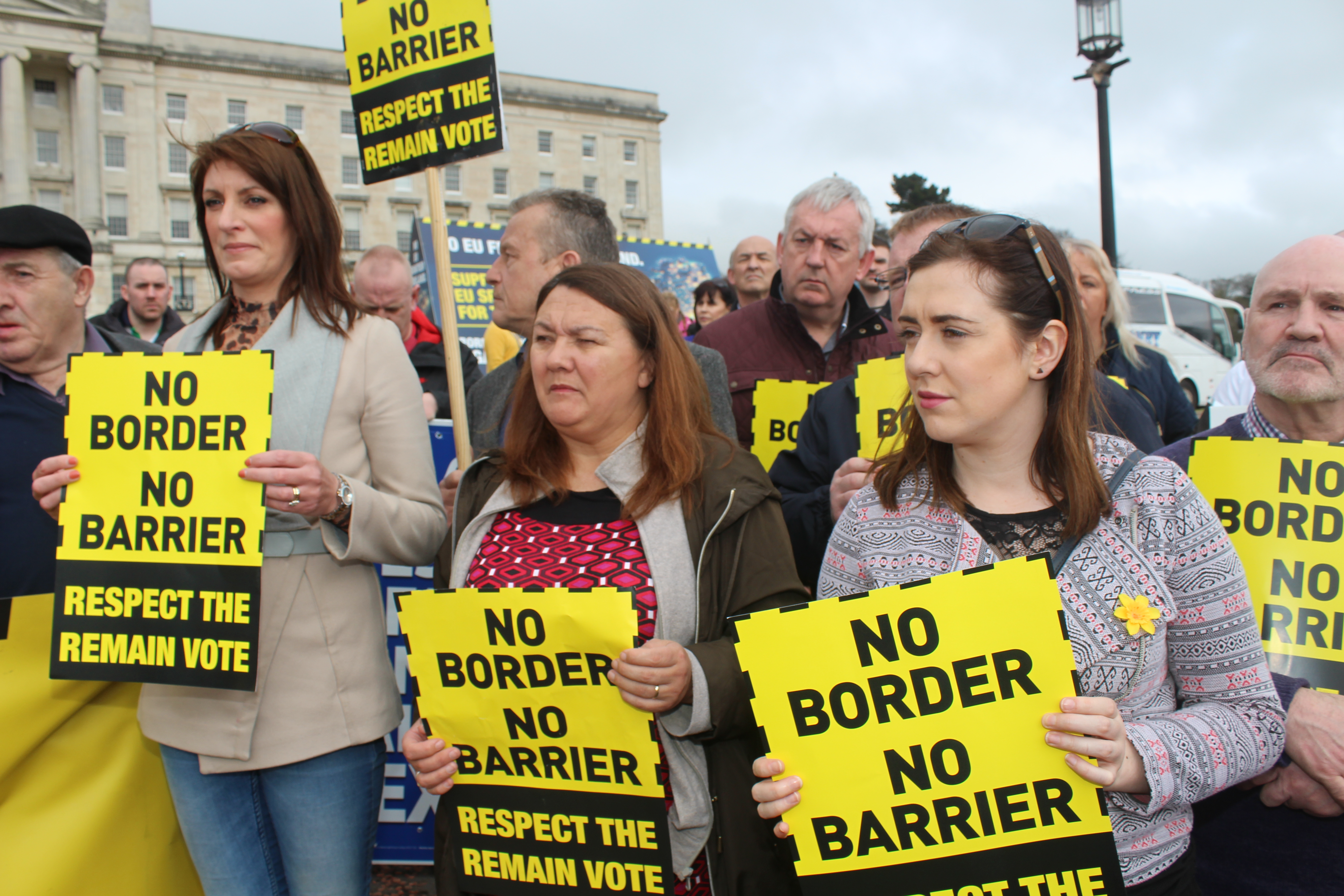
A Sinn Féin protest against a hard border. Post-Brexit border controls are a controversial issue.

The UK voted to leave the European Union in a referendum on 23 June 2016. Its withdrawal made the Republic of Ireland–Northern Ireland border an external EU border. The Irish government, the UK government and EU representatives, all stated that they did not wish for a hard border in Ireland due to the sensitive nature of the border.

In order to forestall this, and to prevent a backdoor into the European Single Market, the Second May ministry proposed a backstop agreement within the Withdrawal Agreement that would put Northern Ireland under a range of EU rules in order to forestall the need for border checks. This was opposed by the first Johnson ministry as producing an effective border between Great Britain and Northern Ireland. In late October 2019, the second Johnson ministry reached a Brexit withdrawal agreement with the EU which contained a revised Northern Ireland Protocol that commits the UK to maintaining an open border in Ireland and continued operation in Northern Ireland of the European Single Market. The effect is thus that (in many respects), there is a de facto trade border at the Irish Sea. The subsequent Windsor Agreement refined the operation of the protocol but did not fundamentally alter it.

== Distinctive physical characteristics ==
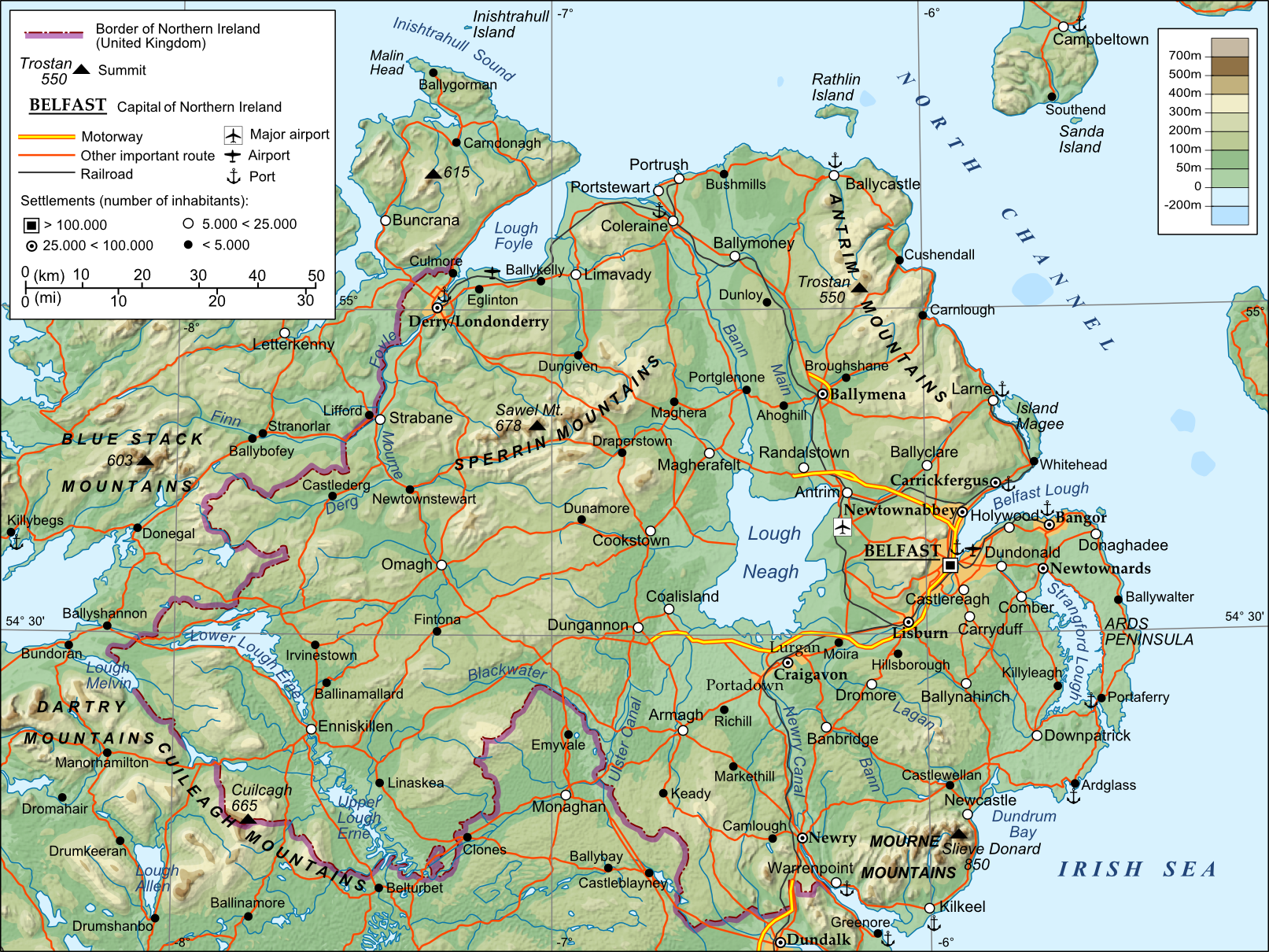
Map of Northern Ireland and the border

The border is extremely irregular. Its irregularities were inherited from well-established county boundaries. The 499 km (310 mi) border is not explicitly described in statute but only implicitly inferred from the territorial definition of Northern Ireland as contained in the Government of Ireland Act 1920. It states that "Northern Ireland shall consist of the parliamentary counties of Antrim, Armagh, Down, Fermanagh, Londonderry and Tyrone, and the parliamentary boroughs of Belfast and Londonderry, and Southern Ireland shall consist of so much of Ireland as is not comprised within the said parliamentary counties and boroughs."

The border has some distinctive features. Firstly, how irregular it is: the border is about four times the straight-line distance between Lough Foyle and Carlingford Lough. Second, County Donegal is connected to the rest of the Republic of Ireland only by a territorial isthmus 9 km (6 mi) wide, making it more convenient for some journeys from Donegal to other parts of the Republic of Ireland to pass through Northern Ireland. Third, for only two relatively short sections of the border does it align with the provincial boundary of nine county Ulster between Fermanagh-Leitrim and Armagh-Louth. And lastly, as the border skirts Tyrone to the west and again to the south east, it encompasses County Fermanagh on three sides.

As a remnant of 17th-century county limits, the border's physical profile indicates that it follows many watercourses but only in the highlands of the Cavan-Fermanagh section could the border be said to accord with any significant physical impediments to movement. There are around 270 road border crossings, with some roads traversing the border several times. Similarly, before its closure in 1957, a section of one railway line between Clones and Cavan crossed the border six times in 13 km (8 mi), initially with customs checks at each crossing. Further railways including Great Northern Railway crossed the border several times.

== Road crossings ==
Between 270 and 300 roads cross the border, with some roads crossing the border more than once. While some roads cross the border twice or three times, the N54/A3 road crosses the border four times within 10 km (6.2 mi).

The larger and busier border crossings include national primary (N) roads in the Republic of Ireland which connect to primary route (A) roads in Northern Ireland. As of 2007, the busiest such roads were the N1/A1 route (Dundalk/Newry), N13/A2 route (Letterkenny/Derry) and N15/A38 route (Lifford/Strabane).

== Maritime border ==
A 1988 treaty demarcates the boundary of the exclusive economic zones across the continental shelf from the south Irish Sea southwest to the Celtic Sea.

=== Waters around Northern Ireland ===
The exact division of territorial waters between Northern Ireland and Southern Ireland ('Southern Ireland' being coterminous with the territory of the modern-day Irish state) was a matter of some controversy from the outset. The Government of Ireland Act 1920 did not explicitly address the position of territorial waters although Section 11(4) provided that neither Southern Ireland nor Northern Ireland would have any competence to make laws in respect of "Lighthouses, buoys, or beacons (except so far as they can consistently with any general Act of the Parliament of the United Kingdom be constructed or maintained by a local harbour authority)".

When the territory that initially was Southern Ireland ultimately became a separate self-governing dominion outside the United Kingdom known as the Irish Free State, the status of the territorial waters naturally took on a significance it had not had before. Northern Ireland's Unionists were conscious of this matter from an early stage. They were keen to put it beyond doubt that the territorial waters around Northern Ireland would not belong to the Irish Free State. In this regard, James Craig, the Prime Minister of Northern Ireland put the following question in the British House of Commons on 27 November 1922 (the month before the establishment of the Irish Free State):

Another important matter on which I should like a statement of the Government's intentions, is with regard to the territorial waters surrounding Ulster. Under the Act of 1920, the areas handed over to the Governments of Northern Ireland and Southern Ireland respectively, were defined as the six Parliamentary counties of Northern Ireland and the twenty-six Parliamentary counties of Southern Ireland. I understand there is considerable doubt in the minds of lawyers and others as to whether these Parliamentary counties carry with them the ordinary territorial waters, extending three miles out from the shore. It has been asserted in some quarters that the Parliamentary counties only extend to low water mark. That has been exercising the minds of a good many people in Ulster, and I shall be glad if the Government in due course will inform the House what is their opinion on the subject and what steps they are taking to make it clear. ... Am I to understand that the Law Officers have actually considered this question, and that they have given a decision in favour of the theory that the territorial waters go with the counties that were included in the six counties of Northern Ireland?

In response the Attorney General, Sir Douglas Hogg, said that "I have considered the question, and I have given an opinion that that is so [i.e. the territorial waters do go with the counties]".

However, this interpretation that the territorial waters went with the counties was later disputed by Irish governments. On 29 February 1972, the Taoiseach, Jack Lynch, summarised the Irish position during a Dáil debate on the legal status of HMS Maidstone, a prison ship which was moored in Belfast Harbour at the time:

[W]e claim that the territorial waters around the whole island of Ireland are ours and our claim to the territorial waters around Northern Ireland is based on the Government of Ireland Act of 1920. This Act is so referred to in the 1921 Treaty that the Northern Ireland which withdrew from the Irish Free State is identical with the Northern Ireland defined in the Government of Ireland Act, 1920, and defined as consisting of named counties and boroughs. It is, I think, common case between us that in English law the counties do not include adjacent territorial waters and, therefore, according to our claim these territorial waters were retained by the Irish Free State.

A dispute arose between the Government of the Irish Free State of the one part and the Northern Ireland and UK governments of the other part over territorial waters in Lough Foyle. Lough Foyle lies between County Londonderry in Northern Ireland and County Donegal in what was then the Irish Free State. A court case in the Free State in 1923 relating to fishing rights in Lough Foyle held that the Free State's territorial waters ran right up to the shore of County Londonderry. In 1927, illegal fishing on Lough Foyle had become so grave that Northern Ireland Prime Minister James Craig entered into correspondence with his Free State counterpart, W. T. Cosgrave. Craig indicated to Cosgrave that he proposed to introduce a bill giving the Royal Ulster Constabulary powers to stop and search vessels on Lough Foyle. Cosgrave asserted all of Lough Foyle was Free State territory and that as such a bill of that nature would be rejected by the Free State and its introduction would create "a very serious situation". Cosgrave then raised the matter with the British government. Claims by The Honourable The Irish Society that its fishing rights in the Foyle were being violated by poachers from the Donegal side led to the 1952 creation of the Foyle Fisheries Commission under the joint authority of the Dublin and Belfast governments, which solved problems of jurisdiction without addressing the sovereignty question. The commission was superseded by the Foyle, Carlingford and Irish Lights Commission established after the Good Friday Agreement under the remit of the North/South Ministerial Council.

For as long as both states remain members of the EU (and thus the Common Fisheries Policy), the territorial waters are not disputed in practice between the two states. Their respective exclusive economic zones (EEZs) begin beyond their territorial waters and the boundary between them was agreed in 2014. (Note: (For map, see Rockall).) but the precise maritime boundary between Ireland and the United Kingdom concerning Lough Foyle (and similarly Carlingford Lough) remains disputed in principle. As recently as 2005, when asked to list those areas of EU member states where border definition is in dispute, a British Government minister responding for the Secretary of State for Foreign and Commonwealth Affairs stated:

Border definition (ie the demarcation of borders between two internationally recognised sovereign states with an adjoining territorial or maritime border) is politically disputed [between] Ireland [and the] UK (Lough Foyle, Carlingford Lough—quiescent)

During Dáil debates on the Carlingford Fisheries Bill, a contributor to the debate stated that he welcomed "the Bill's aim of defining the area of jurisdiction over the Foyle". However, the Irish Foyle and Carlingford Fisheries Act 2007 does not mention this issue; neither does the virtually identical British "Foyle and Carlingford Fisheries (Northern Ireland) Order 2007": each merely refers to "the Commission's waters".

The UK's Foreign and Commonwealth Office underlined its view in 2009:

The UK position is that the whole of Lough Foyle is within the UK. We recognise that the Irish Government does not accept this position [...] The regulation of activities in the Lough is now the responsibility of the Loughs Agency, a cross-border body established under the Belfast Agreement of 1998.

A corresponding statement was made by Conor Lenihan, then an Irish Government Minister:

there has never been any formal agreement between Ireland and the United Kingdom on the delimitation of a territorial water boundary between the two states. In the context of the Good Friday Agreement, a decision was taken to co-operate on foreshore and other issues that arise in the management of the lough

== Identification ==
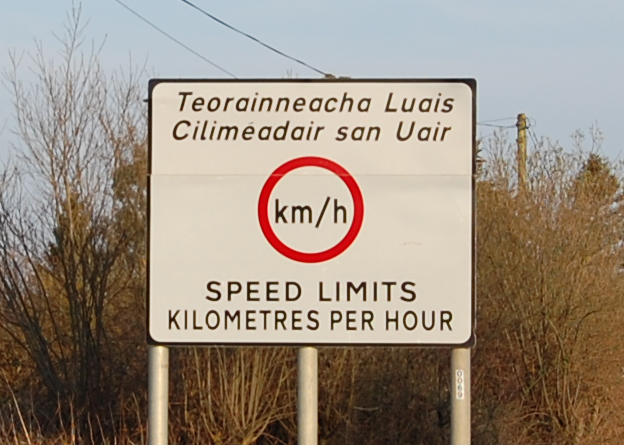
A bilingual traffic sign in County Louth, in the Republic of Ireland, warning drivers travelling south across the border that metric speed limits are used in ROI, whereas the UK uses imperial units in driving

It is estimated that there are 300 major and minor crossings along the 499-kilometre (310-mile) border. The border is marked only by a small number of "Welcome To Northern Ireland" road signs on the UK side, placed there by the Northern Ireland Roads Service. This can make identifying the border difficult for those unfamiliar with landmarks known to locals as the crossing point. At some crossings, there are signs welcoming visitors to the relevant local government authority district or, occasionally, reminding motorists of the need to ensure that their insurance is valid in the relevant jurisdiction.

Generally, signposts in the Republic of Ireland which indicate distances to destinations are bilingual (in Irish and English) and give distances in kilometres while such signposts in Northern Ireland are only in English and give distances in miles. On larger roads, the approximate location of the border can be determined by signs reminding the driver of the change in units. In Northern Ireland, place-name and street/road-name signs are usually (but not always) English-only and street/road-name signs are more standardised and extensively used.

There are other immediate indicators when crossing the border: differences in the design of road signage and a change in road markings. The hard shoulder on non-motorway roads in Ireland is marked with a yellow, usually broken, line. The same marking in Northern Ireland is white and usually continuous. In Northern Ireland, roads use A (major) and B (minor) route prefixes, whereas the Republic of Ireland's route prefixes are M (motorway) N (major, standing for national) and R (minor, standing for regional). Road signs in both the Republic and those in Northern Ireland are mainly black/white/red triangles or circles (the same as the rest of the European Union). Signs have subtle differences in colouring and fonts. One notable exception to this is that hazard warning signs in the Republic are amber diamonds.

Since the adoption by the Republic of Ireland of metric speed limits, warning signs have been placed on either side of the border to alert motorists to the change to or from miles or kilometres per hour. As the United Kingdom does not use the euro, advertised prices for service stations and shops will change currency on crossing, although many places along the border will accept cross-border currency informally (albeit usually at a rate favourable to the trader). Other typical signs of crossing a European border are also noticeable. These include subtle differences in the paving materials of road surfaces and pavements, sometimes with visible differences in colour between materials across the border, changes to street lighting when crossing the border (though these also vary across inter-county borders), and changes in the colour of postboxes (green in Ireland, red in Northern Ireland).

By rail, there is no immediate sign of crossing the border, but the trackside mileage markers change from Irish-style black-on-white markers at the 59 3/4-mile post (from Dublin Connolly railway station) to black-on-yellow markers, common to the United Kingdom, at the 60-mile post, between Dundalk and Newry stations.

== Mobile phone roaming charges ==
As in most places, radio signals from the cellular networks on both sides of the border often travel several kilometres (a few miles) across it. This was a source of annoyance to those resident in border areas when roaming charges were incurred with most service providers if the phone connects to the "wrong" network when making or even receiving a call. Inter-member mobile phone roaming charges were abolished in the European Union from 15 June 2017. This arrangement has so far continued after Brexit.

== Cultural references ==
Puckoon is a comic novel by Spike Milligan, first published in 1963. It is set in 1924 and details the troubles brought to the fictional Irish village of Puckoon by the Partition of Ireland when the new border passes directly through the village. It was later made into a film in 2002.

Irish touring cyclist and author of adventure travel books Dervla Murphy travelled by bicycle from Lismore, County Waterford to Northern Ireland during the height of The Troubles and wrote of the experience in her 1978 book A Place Apart, including encounters along the border.

In the 1980s, Colm Tóibín walked the length of the border, later releasing a travel book entitled Bad Blood: A Walk Along the Irish Border.

Following the Brexit vote in 2016, a mockumentary about a fictional post-Brexit border patrol named the Soft Border Patrol was produced by the BBC. In 2018, an anonymous Twitter account called @BorderIrish gained notability tweeting as the Irish border in the first person, and the implications that Brexit would have for it.

The work of Irish folk-punk singer Jinx Lennon sometimes draws inspiration from his upbringing along the border as well as societal issues which affect the people living there. His 2020 album "Border Schizo FFFolk Songs For The Fuc**d", self-described as a "psychedelic punk-folk concept album journey through the hinterlands of the Irish Border", explored such themes as cocaine dependence, pride in rural Ireland and the 2014 Garda whistleblower scandal. His 2021 follow-up album, "Liferafts for Latchicos", was described by Lennon as a "solid border album", including a song named "Border Lad".

== Border settlements ==
The following cities, towns and villages are located on the border or not far from it (listed from Lough Foyle to Carlingford Lough):

- Muff, Inishowen, County Donegal
- Culmore, County Londonderry
- Derry, County Londonderry
- Bridgend, County Donegal
- Killea, County Donegal
- Newtowncunningham, County Donegal
- Carrigans, County Donegal
- St Johnston, County Donegal
- Lifford, County Donegal (linked to Strabane by Lifford Bridge)
- Strabane, County Tyrone (linked to Lifford by Lifford Bridge)
- Clady, County Tyrone
- Castlefin, County Donegal
- Castlederg, County Tyrone
- Killeter, County Tyrone
- Pettigo, County Donegal and Tullyhommon, County Fermanagh (separated by a river)
- Ballyshannon, County Donegal
- Bundoran, County Donegal
- Belleek, County Fermanagh (part of Belleek is actually in County Donegal, as the border passes through the town but most of it is on the 'northern' side)
- Kiltyclogher, County Leitrim
- Garrison, County Fermanagh
- Manorhamilton, County Leitrim
- Glenfarne, County Leitrim
- Rossinver, County Leitrim
- Blacklion, County Cavan and
- Belcoo, County Fermanagh (linked to Blacklion by bridge)
- Florencecourt, County Fermanagh
- Holywell, County Fermanagh
- Swanlinbar, County Cavan
- Ballyconnell, County Cavan
- Belturbet, County Cavan
- Butlersbridge, County Cavan
- Derrylin, County Fermanagh
- Scotshouse, County Monaghan
- Newtownbutler, County Fermanagh
- Clones, County Monaghan
- Aughnacloy, County Tyrone
- Glaslough, County Monaghan
- Drummully, County Monaghan
- Caledon, County Tyrone
- Middletown, County Armagh
- Keady, County Armagh
- Derrynoose, County Armagh
- Newtownhamilton, County Armagh
- Cullaville, County Armagh
- Forkhill, County Armagh
- Dundalk, County Louth
- Jonesborough, County Armagh
- Newry, County Armagh/County Down
- Meigh, County Armagh
- Warrenpoint, County Down
- Omeath, County Louth
- Faughart, County Louth/South Armagh

== Major road crossings ==
The European Union Exit Analysis Branch identified fifteen principal points near border crossings in 2018, so they could be used as inspection points in case a post-Brexit deal collapsed. The border crossings these relate to are:

- N1 / A1
- N53 / A37
- N2 / A5
- N12 / A3
- N54 / A3
- N3 / Senator George Mitchell Peace Bridge / A509
- N87 / A32
- N16 / A4
- N14 / N15 / A38
- N13 / A2

== See also ==
- Border Region – NUTS 3 statistical region of the Republic of Ireland
- Brexit and the Irish border – Effect on Ireland's UK/EU border
- British–Irish relations
  - British nationality law
    - British nationality law and Ireland – Status of citizens of Ireland living in the United Kingdom
  - Common Travel Area – Open-borders area between the United Kingdom and Ireland
  - Foreign relations of Ireland
  - Foreign relations of the United Kingdom
  - Irish nationality law
- Irish Sea Bridge – Hypothetical rail and road bridge that would span the Irish Sea
- Partitionism – View of Ireland as having two distinct parts
- Repartition of Ireland – Hypothetical redrawn border between the Republic of Ireland and Northern Ireland

== Sources ==
- Denton, Gilbert; Fahy, Tony (1993). The Northern Ireland Land Boundary 1923–1992. Belfast: HM Customs and Excise. OCLC 56443670.
