= A4 road (Northern Ireland) =

Major road in Northern Ireland

Coordinates: 54.36046°N 7.3417°W

A4

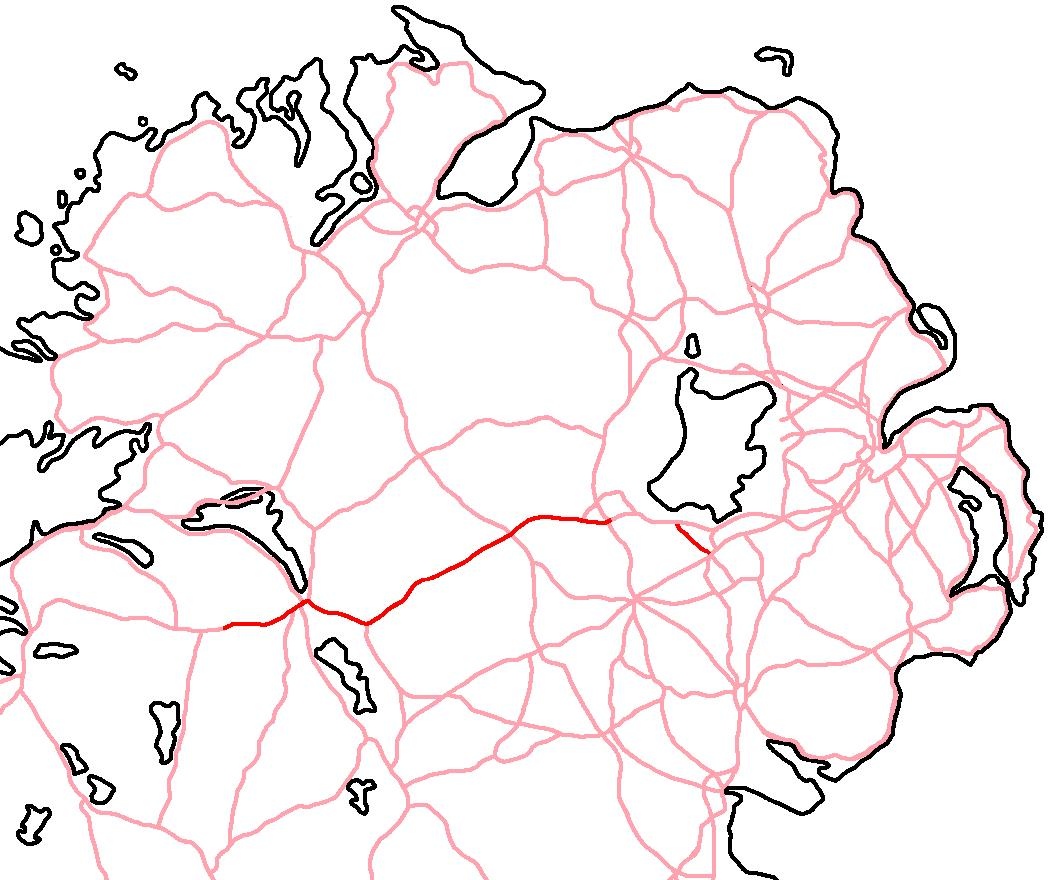

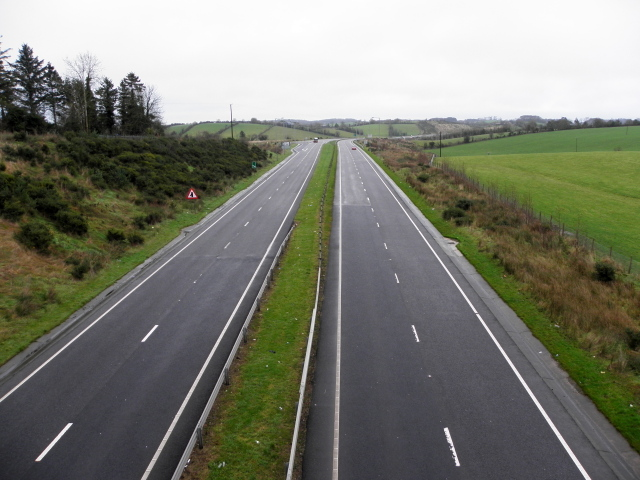
- Near Cabragh

Route information
- Length: 69.2 mi (111.4 km)

Major junctions
- East end: Portadown
- A3 in Portadown M1 Junction 12 at The Birches M1 Junction 15 nr. Dungannon A29 at Moygashel A5 at Ballygawley A28 at Augher A34 at Maguiresbridge A32 at Enniskillen A46 at Enniskillen A509 at Enniskillen; B52 at Belcoo
- West end: Outside Belcoo at border with the Republic. Becomes N16.

Location
- Country: United Kingdom
- Constituent country: Northern Ireland
- Primary destinations: Portadown; Dungannon; Enniskillen; Sligo

Road network
- Roads in Northern Ireland; Motorways; A roads in Northern Ireland

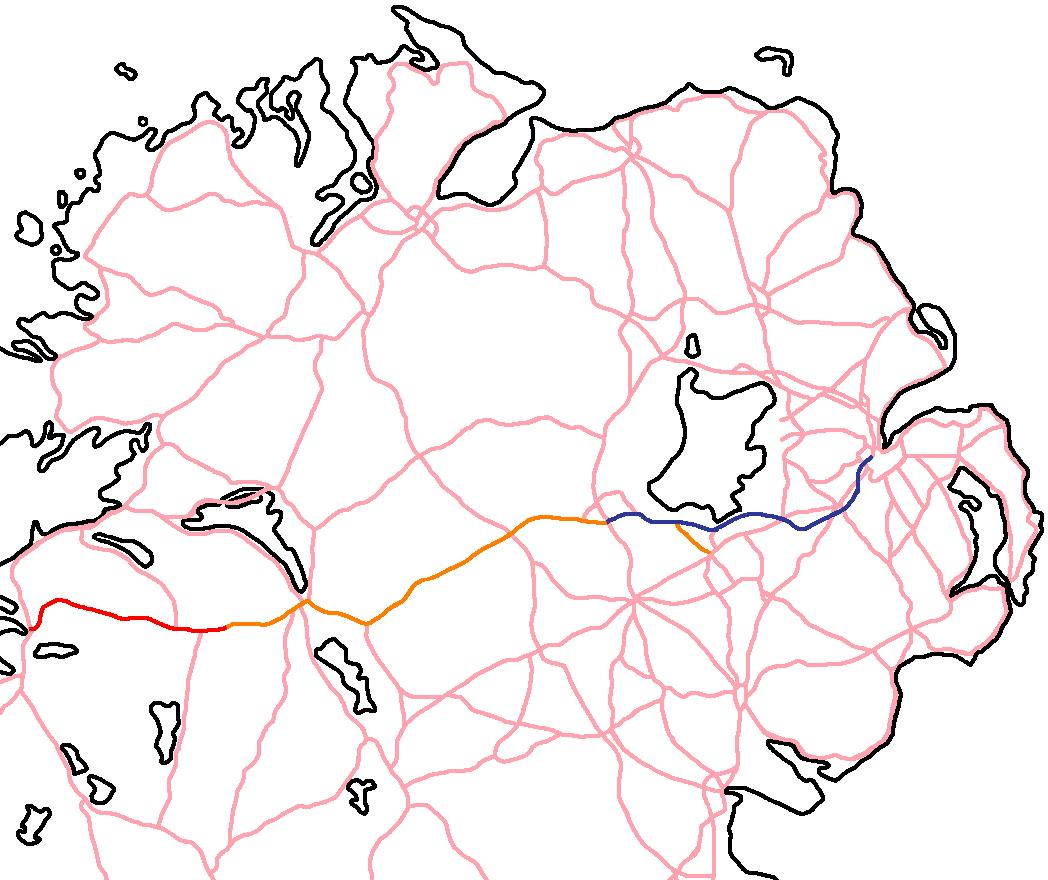
The route of the A4 in orange from Portadown (County Armagh) to Belcoo (County Fermanagh). The Northern Irish M1 is in blue, and the N16 is in red.

The A4 is a major east–west road in Northern Ireland. It travels for 69.2 miles from Portadown to Belcoo through County Armagh, County Tyrone and County Fermanagh.

Although once being a single continuous route, the A4 nowadays is split into two completely divided stretches. The route branches off from the A3 Lisburn-Armagh road in Portadown and meets the M1 at Junction 12. The A4 the re-appears at the end of the M1 motorway at Junction 15 south of Moygashel, from which point it continues uninterrupted to the border village of Belcoo in western County Fermanagh. At the border with the Republic of Ireland, the A3 meets with the N16 road to Sligo. For its entire length the A4 is a primary route. At present, it is mainly single carriageway, apart from a 13 mile long section from the end of the M1 at Moygashel until Ballygawley, which is dual carriageway. There are numerous stretches of the route which have overtaking lanes through counties Tyrone and Fermanagh.

== Route ==
The A4 begins near Portadown town centre at a junction with the A3 Northway and the B77 towards Loughgall. Continuing along Corcrain Road and Charles Street in the Portadown suburbs, it meets a roundabout with the B28 road to Moy. The A4 continues as a short stretch, called the Dungannon Road, to Junction 12 of the M1 at The Birches.

The A4 resumes at the end of the M1 at the junction with the A29. The old road from The Birches through Tamnamore, Killyman to Dungannon still exists parallel to the M1 motorway, but its sections have all been downgraded to the B34, B131 and a C road. Until 1980, all traffic following the A4 had to leave the M1 at its final junction and travel through Dungannon town centre to rejoin the A4, but a by-pass opened that year continued the A4 route ahead past the final junction of the M1, including a short section of dual-carriageway which had been built at the same time as the construction of the M1 itself. The A4 dual carriageway then continues, bypassing the hamlets of Granville, Cabragh and Ballyreagh, as well as the village of Ballygawley. At the Ballygawley Roundabout the dual carriageway ends and the A4 meets the A5. The route then carries on as a single carriageway through the Clogher Valley villages of Augher (where it meets the A28), Clogher and Fivemiletown. The road crosses the county border into County Fermanagh, and skirts past the villages of Brookeborough, Maguiresbridge (meeting the A34), Lisbellaw and Tamlaght on its approach to Enniskillen. These villages were by-passed in the 1960s, and since then the Ballygawley-Enniskillen stretch of the A4 has seen the construction of numerous climbing lanes and overtaking lanes in both directions. In wider sections of the road, the hard shoulder has been converted for use as a "slow lane" for a short distance for westbound traffic in two places; between Dungannon and Ballygawley at the Cappagh crossroads, and between Fivemiletown and Brookeborough.

In and around Enniskillen, A4 traffic multiplexes with traffic coming from the A32 route from Omagh to Florencecourt. In the town centre the A4 has overtaking lanes and crosses the River Erne next to Enniskillen Castle. There are traffic-light controlled junctions with the A32 (to Omagh) and the A46 (to Belleek). On the western edge of the town the A4 has a roundabout with the A509 (to Derrylin, Cavan and Dublin), and one mile later there is a T-junction with the A32 (to Florencecourt).

West of Enniskillen town, the A4 passes through the hamlet of Letterbreen and the village of Belcoo, where it then reaches the border with the Republic of Ireland (at a bridge over Lough MacNean into Blacklion) and continues westward toward Sligo as the N16.

== Road quality ==
The route from Dungannon to Ballygawley (approximately 12 1/2 miles; 20.1 km) was upgraded to a dual carriageway standard, with the new road opened in November 2010. The scheme includes a central reservation safety barrier, a hard shoulder and six grade separated junctions. The estimated cost of the scheme as reported in 2006 was £102 million.

A section of the route between Ballygawley and Augher has been realigned. Clearance work in preparation for the realignment occurred in November and December 2007. Construction commenced in 2008 and was completed in March 2010.

As of 2018 the only major improvement planned for the A4 is the construction of a southern bypass for the town of Enniskillen. This is currently proposed by the Department for Infrastructure as a single carriageway road (with some limited opportunities to overtake) that will bridge the River Erne near the Killyhelvin Hotel, creating the town's third vehicular crossing of the river.

Despite speculation about the possibility of providing more climbing lanes or overtaking lanes, and despite calls for bypasses of villages in the Clogher Valley (e.g. Fivemiletown), there are no concrete plans to further improve the A4 currently being pursued by the Department for Infrastructure.

== Planned developments ==
The Department for Regional Development plans some future road schemes for the A4:

- By-passes of Fivemiletown and the southern end of Enniskillen, and the installation of "2+1" route between Ballygawley and Enniskillen.

== Tourist attractions ==
There are a number of tourist attractions on or close to the A4. These include:

- The Linen Green, Dungannon
- Clogher Valley
- Marble Arch Caves
