= A34 road (Northern Ireland) =

Road in Northern Ireland

Coordinates: 54.2218°N 7.4111°W

A34

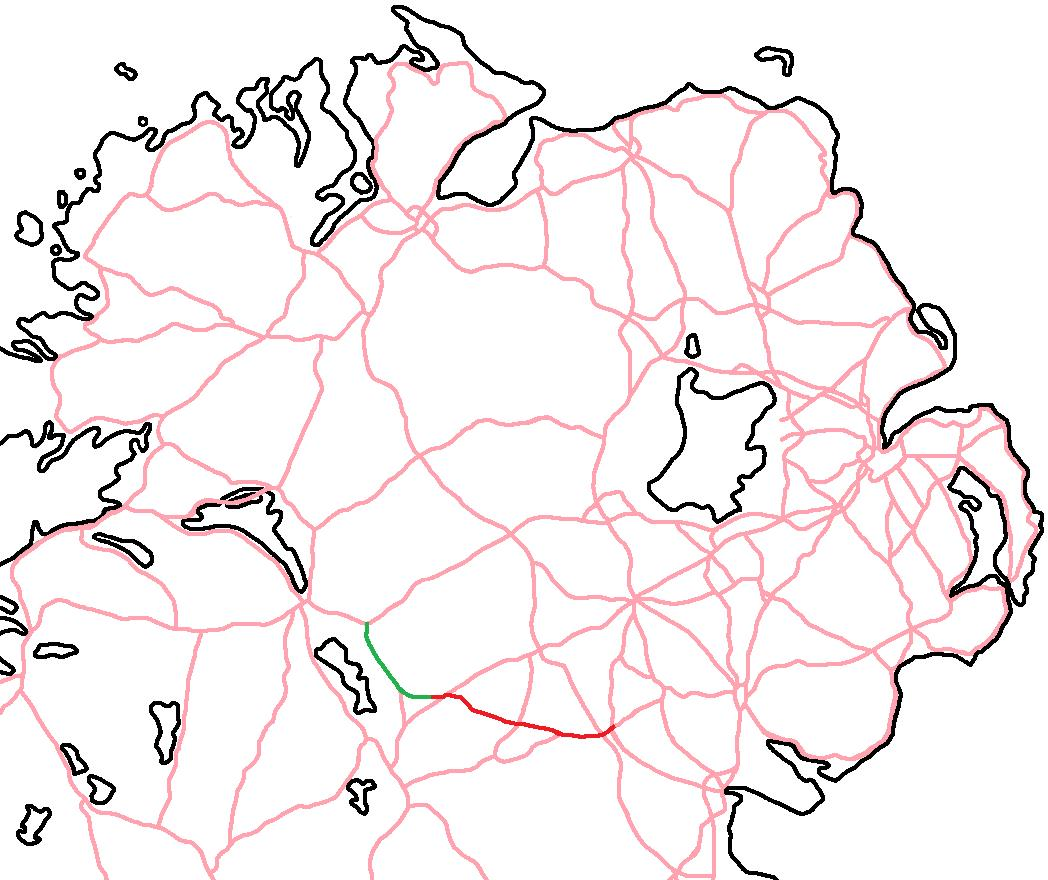
- The route of the A34 in green from Maguiresbridge (County Fermanagh) to the border on the outskirts of Clones (County Monaghan). The R183 is also shown (in red) which is the route's number in the Republic as it traverses the county, before finishing in Castleblaney.

Route information
- Length: 15.2 mi (24.5 km)

Major junctions
- North West end: Maguiresbridge

Location
- Country: United Kingdom
- Constituent country: Northern Ireland
- Primary destinations: Enniskillen; Maguiresbridge; Lisnaskea; Newtownbutler; Clones

Road network
- Roads in Northern Ireland; Motorways; A roads in Northern Ireland

The A34 is a road in County Fermanagh in Northern Ireland. The route carries traffic from the A4 in Maguiresbridge (east of Enniskillen) via Lisnaskea and Newtownbutler (connecting with the B533 to Wattlebridge on the A3) to Clones in County Monaghan.

The route is 15.2 miles long, however the last 1.2 miles lie in the Republic of Ireland, forming part of the R183 at Clones. The R183 continues to Castleblaney.

The A34 runs to the east of Upper Lough Erne. The section between Lisnaskea and Newtownbutler once formed the old coach road between Dublin and Enniskillen.
