= A509 road (Northern Ireland) =

Road in Northern Ireland

Coordinates: 54.22651°N 7.60812°W

A509

Major junctions
- North end: Enniskillen
- A4 in Enniskillen A32 in Enniskillen A46 in Enniskillen N3 in Belturbet
- Finish end: Belturbet

Location
- Country: United Kingdom
- Constituent country: Northern Ireland
- Primary destinations: Enniskillen; Derrylin; Belturbet; Cavan

Road network
- Roads in Northern Ireland; Motorways; A roads in Northern Ireland

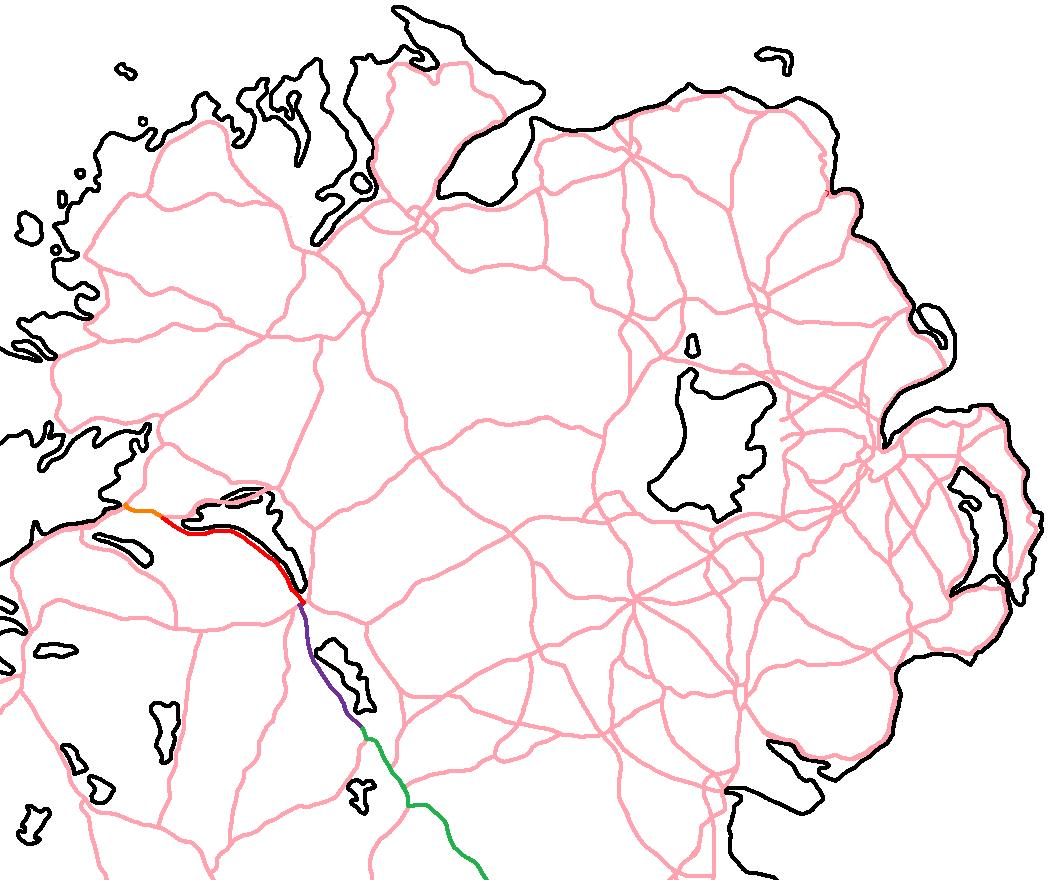
The route of the A509 in blue from Enniskillen (Co. Fermanagh) to near Belturbet (Co. Cavan). The continuations of this longer Dublin-Ballyshannon (Co. Donegal) route are also shown; the N3 from Dublin to Belturbet in green, the A46 from Enniskillen to Belleek (Co. Fermanagh) in red, and the N3 from Belleek to Ballyshannon in orange.

The A509 is a road in Northern Ireland. It travels through County Fermanagh and continues to Cavan and Dublin in the Republic of Ireland as the N3.

The road is a single-carriageway primary route, and forms part of a road corridor from Dublin to Ballyshannon via the N3 route in the Republic of Ireland and the A4 and A46 routes in Northern Ireland.

== Route ==
The A509 commences at a roundabout with the A4 on the outskirts of Enniskillen and follows a south-easterly path parallel to Upper Lough Erne. The road passes through the villages of Bellaneleck and Mackin, and Derrylin and Teemore at the foot of Slieve Rushen. The road then skirts past the village of Aghalane, and crosses the Senator George Mitchell Peace Bridge to link with the N3 onwards to Belturbet, Cavan, Navan and Dublin.
