= A47 road (Northern Ireland) =

Road in Northern Ireland

A47

Major junctions
- Start end: Belleek
- A46; N3 for Ballyshannon; B136; A35
- Finish end: Kesh

Location
- Country: United Kingdom
- Constituent country: Northern Ireland
- Primary destinations: Ballyshannon

Road network
- Roads in Northern Ireland; Motorways; A roads in Northern Ireland

The A47 road runs from Kesh to Belleek along the north shore of Lower Lough Erne. The A47 commences from Letterkeen, a townland north of Kesh in County Fermanagh, and heads due west near the shores of Lower Lough Erne and over the eastern causeway and bridge onto Boa Island.

The A47 traverses the island, back over a bridge to an islet, then another bridge on to the mainland. The road follows the trackbed on the left of the former railway of the Great Northern Railway of Ireland [GNR (I)] upon reaching a trailing junction on the right for Pettigo on the B136. The road follows the shores nearby and runs near Castle Caldwell and the closed railway track of the GNR (I) (which was originally part of the Enniskillen and Bundoran Railway) is a field way before heading in different ways into Belleek. In the village there is a right-angled left-hand turn with a junction into Belleek Pottery crosses the River Erne briefly into County Donegal before the junction right for Ballyshannon (along the N3) and then the road turns left and back into County Fermanagh linking into the A46 road (Northern Ireland) (the south shore road of Lower Lough Erne).
