= A46 road (Northern Ireland) =

Road in Northern Ireland

Coordinates: 54.45495°N 7.82085°W

A46

Route information
- Length: 23.6 mi (38.0 km)

Major junctions
- Start end: Belleek
- N3 A47 A32 A4 A509
- Finish end: Enniskillen

Location
- Country: United Kingdom
- Constituent country: Northern Ireland
- Primary destinations: Bundoran; Ballyshannon; Donegal; Enniskillen

Road network
- Roads in Northern Ireland; Motorways; A roads in Northern Ireland

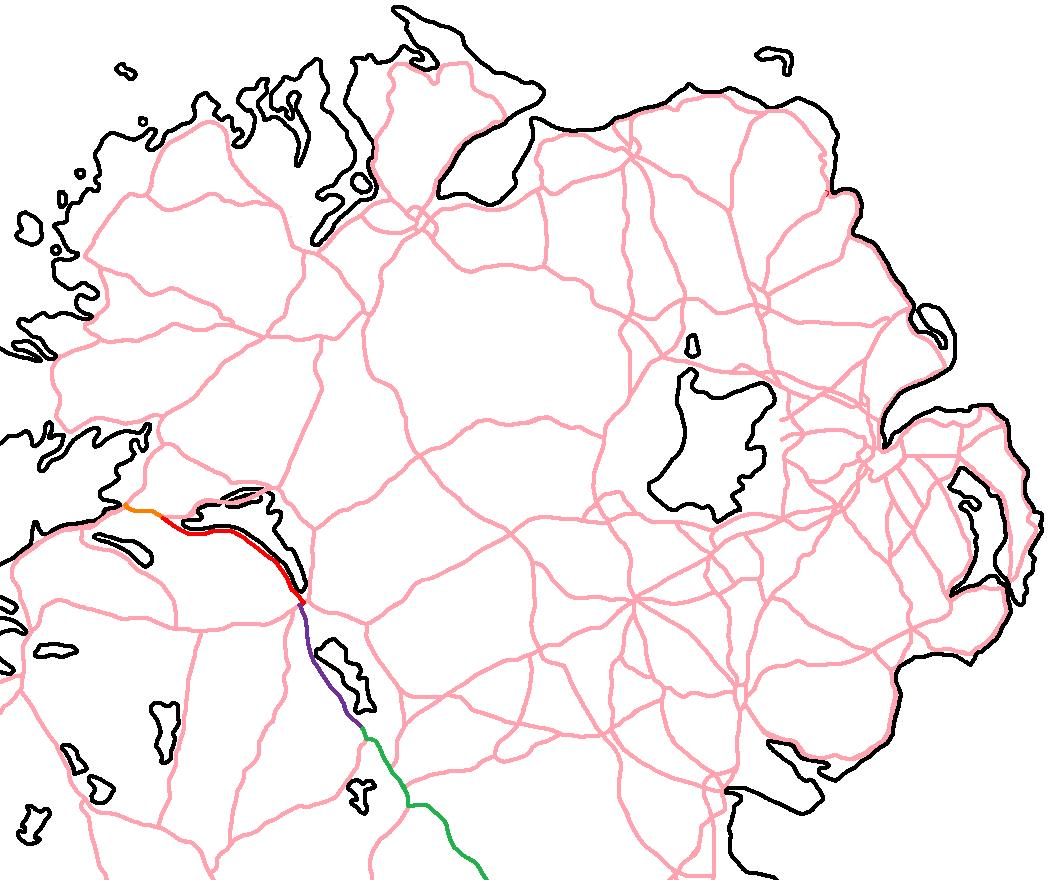
The route of the A46 in red from Enniskillen (County Fermanagh) to Belleek (County Fermanagh). The continuations of this longer Dublin-Ballyshannon (County Donegal) route are also shown; the N3 from Dublin to Belturbet (County Cavan) in green, the A509 from Enniskillen to near Belturbet in blue, and the N3 from Belleek to Ballyshannon in orange.

The A46 is a road in County Fermanagh, in Northern Ireland. It forms part of the route from Dublin to Ballyshannon (County Donegal). It stretches 23.6 miles from Enniskillen to Belleek along the southwestern shoreline of Lower Lough Erne.

In Enniskillen the A46 connects with the following roads including the A4, A32 and the A509 road.

The A46 road leaves the island town of Enniskillen and connects with the A4 which connects with Belfast and also westwards along the Sligo Road to Belcoo and Sligo. The A46 road runs along the Ballyshannon Road which has a park on the left called Brooke Park and The Round O. Portora Royal School is on a drumlin to the right of the road continues northwesterly leaving the Enniskillen at Silverhill before heading into the countryside of the Ulster Lakeland, with farms and golf courses and woodland and glimpses of Lower Lough Erne. Further along nearer to Belleek the opposite shore has the mountains of County Donegal in view whilst the road is below some of the County Fermanagh mountains.

The mountains recede from view as farmland and villages appear the road and the River Erne is on the right then links into Corrycross Roads and the B52 to Belcoo and the A47 road into Belleek, the road then continues into Ballyshannon in County Donegal as the N3 which links into the N15 and into Bundoran. In Ballyshannon the N15 heading northwards connects with Donegal Town.

In Ballyshannon certain road signs have destinations A46 Enniskillen with N3 Dublin with the requisite single arrow pointing in the same direction.
