= R157 road (Ireland) =

Road in Ireland

Coordinates: 53.408099°N 6.519699°W

The R157 is a Regional road between Dunboyne and Maynooth in Ireland. It connects to the M3 motorway (Blanchardstown to Kells). This route runs in Counties Kildare and Meath.

== Route description ==
The R157 runs form Maynooth in County Kildare through Bogganstown and Dunboyne to the M3 Motorway in County Dublin.

== Distance ==
- Westport: 260km
- Malin Head: 315km
- Mizen Head: 392km
