= Lough MacNean =

Freshwater lake in Ireland

- Loch Mac nÉan (Irish)
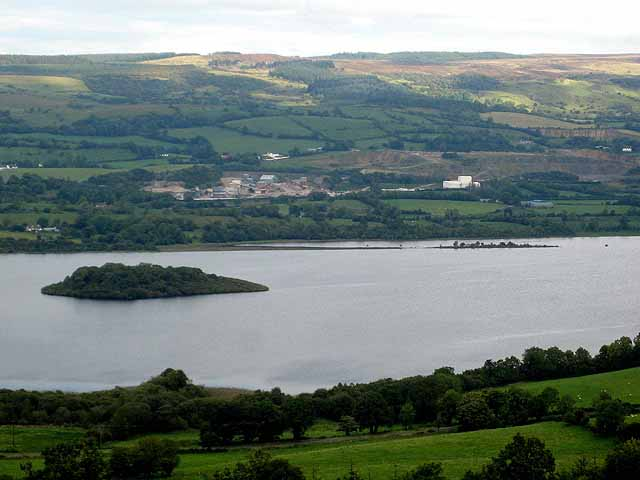
- Inishee on Lower Lough MacNean

- Location in Ireland

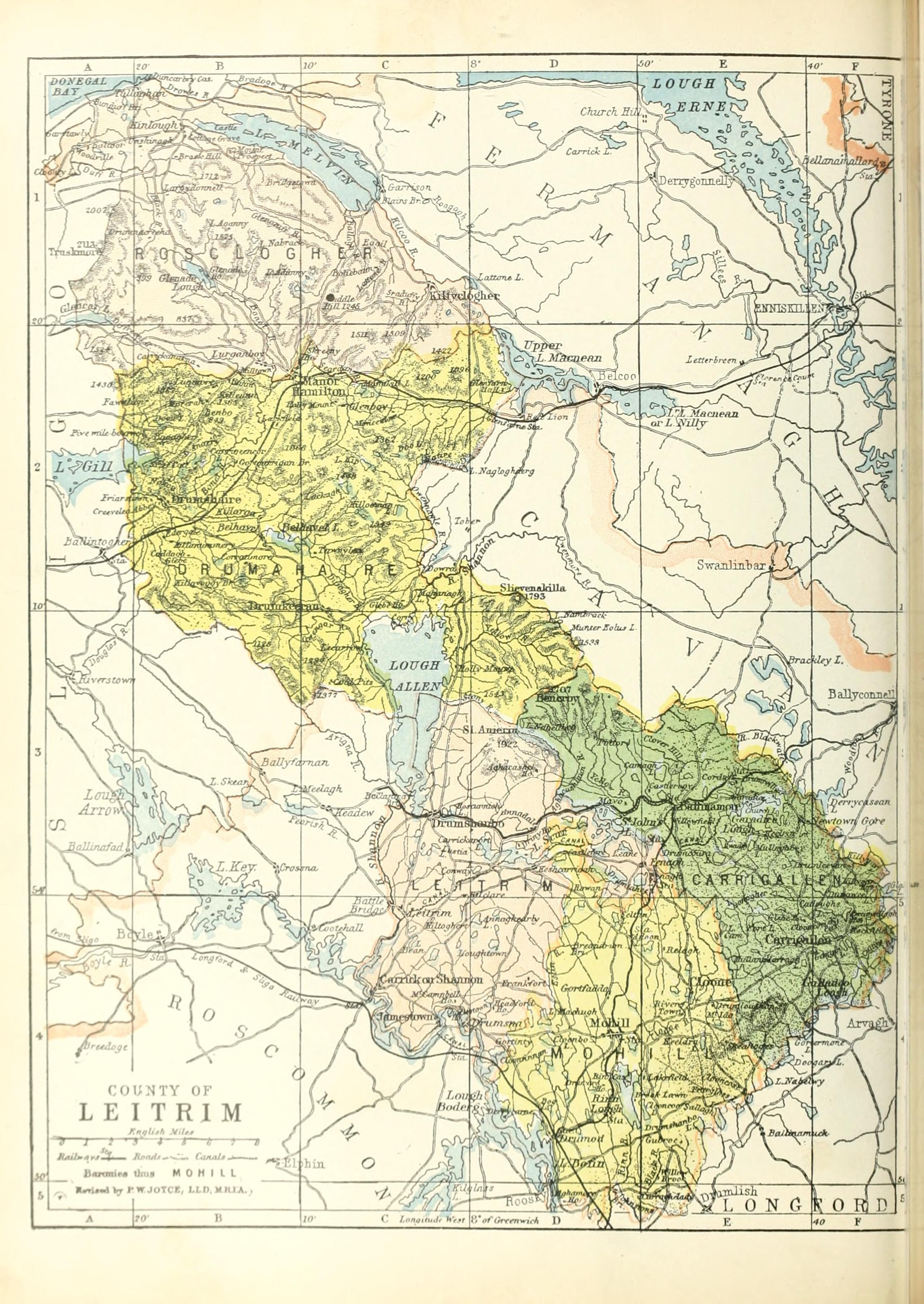
- Map showing Upper (left) and Lower (right) Lough MacNean (1900).
- Location: County Fermanagh; County Cavan; County Leitrim
- Coordinates: 54°17′20″N 7°50′0″W
- Type: Freshwater
- Primary outflows: Arney River
- Basin countries: Northern Ireland, Republic of Ireland
- Settlements: Belcoo, Blacklion, Glenfarne

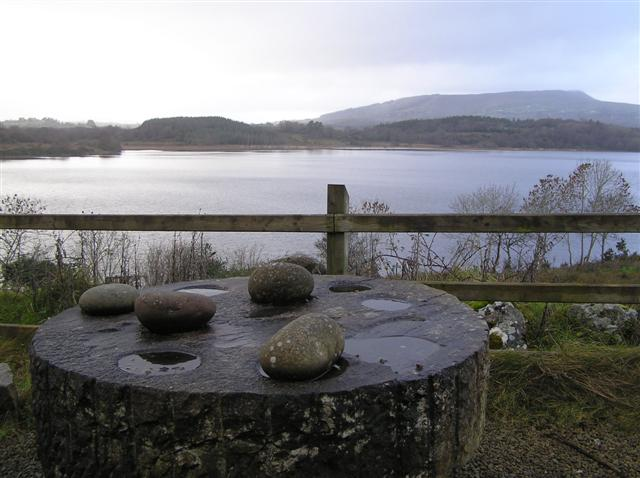
Upper Lough MacNean

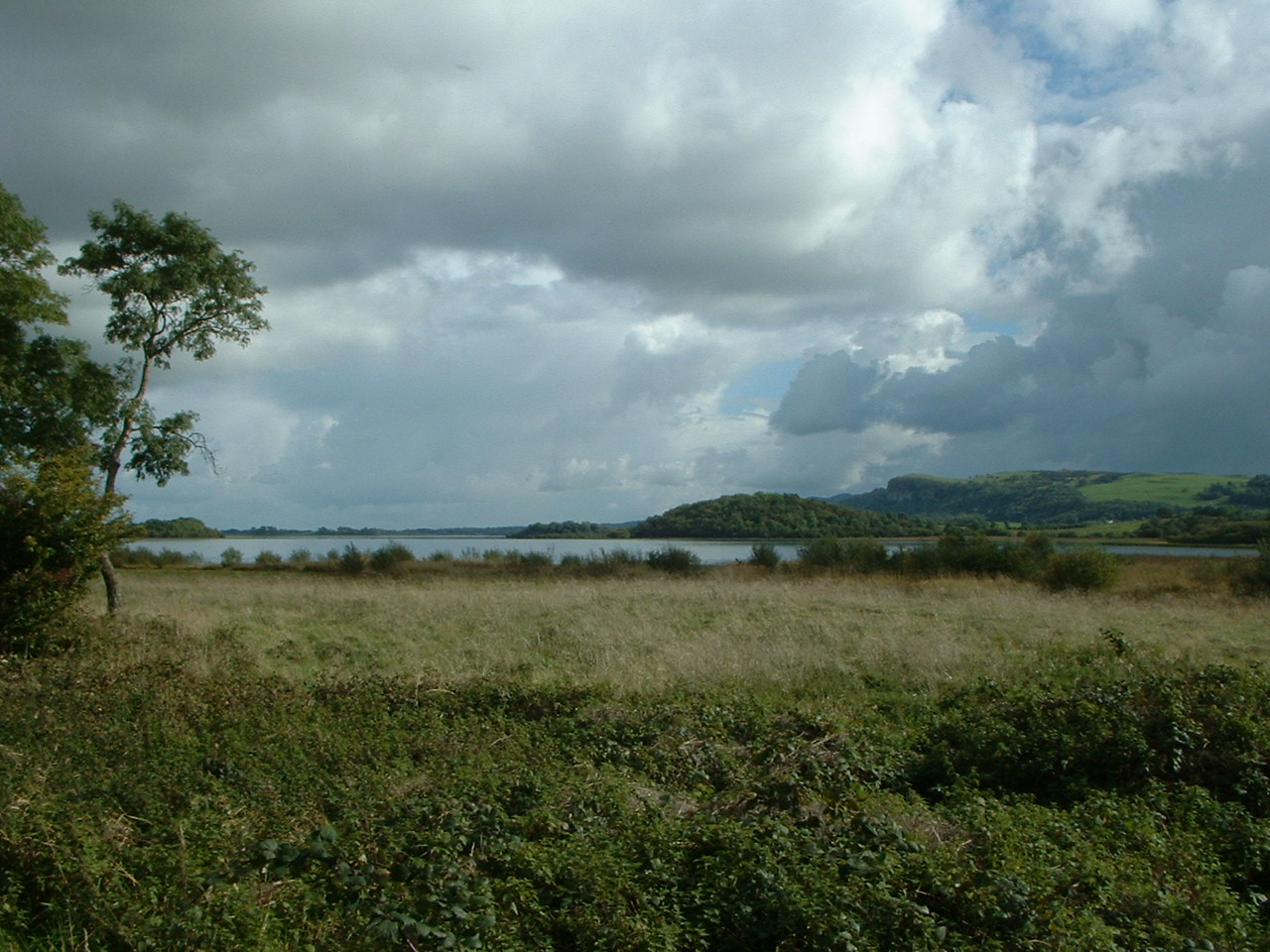
Looking toward Cushrush on Lower Lough MacNean

Lough MacNean (from Irish Loch Mac nÉan, meaning 'Mac nÉan's lake') is a large freshwater lake on the border between Northern Ireland and the Republic of Ireland.

It is in two parts. Lower Lough MacNean (or Lough Nilly), the smaller eastern lake, is mainly in County Fermanagh, with a smaller part in County Cavan. Upper Lough MacNean, the larger western lake, is split between counties Fermanagh, Cavan and Leitrim. On the strip of land between the two lakes are the villages of Belcoo, County Fermanagh and Blacklion, County Cavan. A river, named the Belcoo River, runs between the villages, linking the eastern and western lakes. The river is approximately one mile long, and throughout its length forms the international border.

The shape of Lough MacNean changed during the 1960s when a major draining operation took place; before this, the lake was used for eel fishing, but dredging during the drainage process decimated their numbers.

== Islands ==
Upper Lough MacNean

- Bilberry Island
- Garrow (or Buck) Islands
- Inishkeen
- Inishteig
- Kilrooskagh Island (from Irish Coill Rúsgach, meaning 'wood of the morass')
- Patrick's Island
- Port Island
- Rosscorkey Island
- Trawnish (from Irish Tráinis, meaning 'shore/strand island')
- Tuam Island (from Irish Tuaim, meaning 'tumulus')

Lower Lough MacNean

- Cushrush Island
- Inishee (from Irish Inis Aodha, meaning 'Aodh's island')

Cushrush, Inishteig, Kilrooscagh and Rosscorkey are now fayed to the land by small bridges. Cushrush seems to have been dwelt since the Mesolithic period as many microlithic flint tools have been found there.

There are also the remains of two crannogs; one in each lake. These were small manmade (or partially manmade) islands used as dwellings in ancient times.

== See also ==
- List of loughs in Ireland
