= Macken, County Fermanagh =

Hamlet in County Fermanagh, Northern Ireland

Coordinates: 54.2605°N 7.6377°W

Macken or Mackan (from Irish Meacan) is a small hamlet and townland in County Fermanagh, Northern Ireland, off the A509 main Enniskillen to Derrylin road. Once quite a sizeable village it has now dwindled to containing only a few scattered farmsteads.

== History ==
Macken was the scene of a famous skirmish on the evening of 13 July 1829 between Catholics and Protestants during which four Protestants died. Nineteen Catholics were later charged for their part in the affair. One of them, Ignatius McManus, was hanged and most of the remainder were transported to Botany Bay, Australia.

== See also ==
- List of villages in Northern Ireland
