= Carnaross =

Carnaross Carn na Ros
- Village
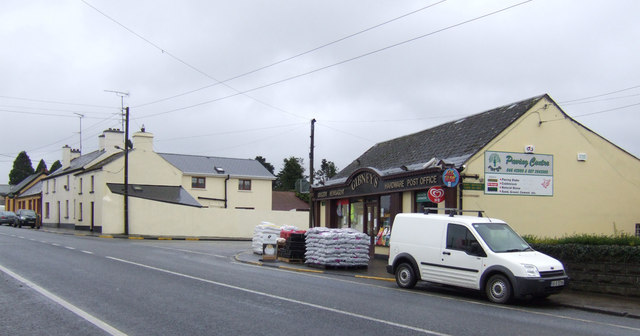
- Carnaross village

- Location in Ireland
- Coordinates: 53°45′N 6°57′W
- Country: Ireland
- Province: Leinster
- County: County Meath

Carnaross or Carnaros (Irish: Carn na Ros) is a village in County Meath, Ireland, approximately 4 km northwest of Kells on the R147 road between Kells and Virginia, County Cavan.

== Etymology ==
Carnaross is an anglicisation of the Irish language Carn na Ros, meaning "cairn of the woods" or "rock of the woods".

Specifically, carn is believed to refer to a local cairn; an ancient pagan burial site or heap of stones over a grave. Evidence for such a burial site may exist nearby in a farmers field. Known as Keim the churchyard, this site contains an ogham inscribed stone which was discovered in 2006. Other sources suggest that carn is derived from carraig, the Irish for stone or rock.

Separately, ros is believed to refer to a hill or promontory covered with trees or brushwood.

== History ==
=== Parish ===
The parish of Carnaross is composed of the three mediaeval parishes of Castle Kieran, Loughan and Dulane. Carnaross is not mentioned as a townland earlier than 1837, and even then John O'Donovan in the Ordnance Survey Field Name Books, refers to it as "a group of houses (two of them public houses) called Carnaross".

A number of sources record holy wells in the area, including one dedicated to Saint Anne.

=== Former constituent parishes ===
==== Loghan ====
One of the former constituent parishes, Loghan or Loughan, is described by Samuel Lewis in his 1837 Topographical Dictionary of Ireland as being:

a parish, partly in the barony of Castlerahan, county of Cavan, and province of Ulster, but chiefly in the barony of Upper Kells, county of Meath, and province of Leinster, 4 miles (N. W.) from Kells, on the road from Dublin by Kells to Enniskillen; containing 3795 inhabitants, of which number, 339 are in the village of Loghan.

Lewis notes that there was then a private school (with 60 pupils) at Carnaross, and the remains small church close to the which was dedicated to Saint Kieran.

==== Dulane ====
Lewis (1837) also has an entry for the parish of Duleen or Dulane, which is also described as being the barony of Upper Kells "on the road to Moynalty; containing 1503 inhabitants". He notes that the "land is generally of good quality; and the system of agriculture is improved" with "sufficient quantity of bog for fuel" A private school of 50 children is recorded, with a number of ancient crosses in the local churchyard.

The Diocese of Meath : Ancient and Modern, published in 1862 by Anthony Cogan, describes the church at Dulane as being at least partly ruined and having "every appearance of antiquity". The area is recorded as being the ancient site of an abbey of Tuilen, or Tulan, founded by Saint Ciaran in the sixth century.

==== Castlekeiran ====
Castlekeiran is also described in The Diocese of Meath : Ancient and modern (Cogan, 1862):

Castlekeiran, a village, in the parish of Loghan, barony of Upper Kells, county of Meath, and province of Leinster, 2 ½ miles (W. N. W.) from Kells; containing 24 houses and 162 inhabitants.
Castlekeiran is called sometimes hter-Chiarain. This place was anciently called Bealaigh-duin, " the Road or Pass of the Fort". A monastery was founded here on the southern bank of the Abhainn-Sele, or Blackwater, by Saint Ciaran, which was called Diseart Chiarain-Bealaigh-duin.

=== Ogham stone ===
An Ogham stone, found in Keim Churchyard has an inscription which reads "COVAGNI MAQI MUCOI LUGUNI". This translates from ogham as: Cuana son of the people of Lugh. The tribes of the Gaileanga and Luighne occupied these territories anciently, with Cuana, Maelan, Mac Maelan and Leochain or Loughan cited as a chiefly names amongst notices for these Luighne and Gaileanga. Cuana is linked with the ancient battle of Belach-Duinn (Castlekeiran).

=== Annalistic references ===
The Annals of the Four Masters have the following notices relating to Carnaross :

770. Ciaran,* the Pious, of Bealach-dain, died on 14 June.

855. Siadhal, Abbot of Disert-Chiarain (Castlekieran), died.

868. Comsudh, Abbot of Disert-Chiarain, of Bealach-duin, died.

949. Castlekieran was plundered by the Danes.

961. Dubhthach, Abbot of Castlekieran, died.

== Notable buildings ==
A former Church of Ireland building on the R147, constructed from sheet metal in the 19th century, is one of the more unusual features of Carnaross. This church, known as the "Iron Church", fell into disuse in the 1970s but was subsequently purchased by a family from Collon, County Louth and used as an independent evangelical place of worship.

Carnaross is home to a cattle mart. The mart held Ireland's first virtual mart during the COVID-19 restrictions in 2020.
