= Senator George Mitchell Peace Bridge =

Bridge between Northern Ireland and Republic of Ireland

Coordinates: 54°07′21″N 7°28′54″W

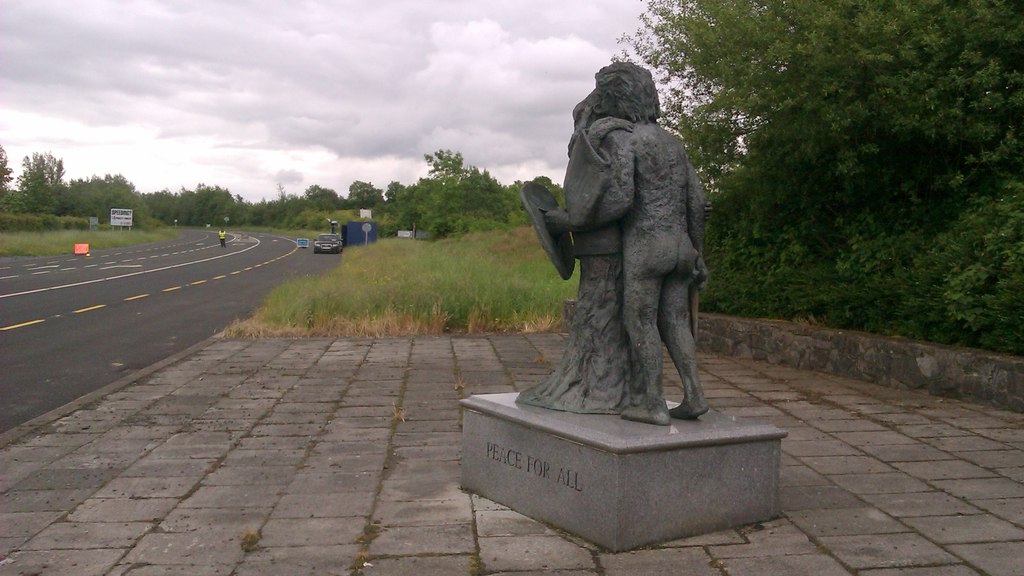
The statue to the south of the bridge

The Senator George Mitchell Peace Bridge (informally called the Peace Bridge or Aghalane Bridge) is a road bridge across the border of Northern Ireland and the Republic of Ireland. It carries the A509 / N3 road between Enniskillen in County Fermanagh and Cavan in County Cavan. The bridge spans the Woodford River (Irish: Sruth Gráinne, meaning 'the Gravelly Stream' or 'the Gravelly River', sometimes anglicised as the River Gráinne or the Graine River).

== Old bridge ==
The bridge replaces an earlier structure to the east, known as Aghalane Bridge, carrying an 'approved road' over the border with formal custom patrols. Aghalane Bridge was named after Aghalane (Irish: Achadh Leathan, meaning 'Broad Field'), a Fermanagh townland on the otherside. This older bridge, which also spanned the Woodford River, was destroyed on 21 November 1972 by Ulster Loyalists during The Troubles. No paramilitary group has ever claimed responsibility for the bombing.

It was quickly replaced by a temporary bridge, but following the detonation of a bomb in the nearby market town of Belturbet the following month, the British Government decided to leave the bridge in a state of disrepair and demolish the temporary structure. The lack of a crossing cut off access to farmland in southern Fermanagh from Belturbet. Local traffic had to undertake a 12-mile (19 km) detour, severing communities and leading to economic decline in the area, with many businesses in Belturbet closing.

== New bridge ==
The current bridge opened in April 1999. It is 30 metres (98 ft) long, with 15 metres (49 ft) in County Fermanagh and the remainder in County Cavan, and was named after the United States Special Envoy for Northern Ireland, George J. Mitchell, who acted as chairman in the Irish peace process talks that led to the Good Friday Agreement the previous year. Of the proposed £1,930,720 cost, £1,061,250 was pledged to be funded by the EU Special Support Programme for Peace and Reconciliation. There is a statue near the bridge on the County Cavan side commemorating the peace process, with the inscription "Peace For All".

== See also ==
- List of international bridges
