= R147 road (Ireland) =

Road in Ireland

R147 road
- Bóthar R147
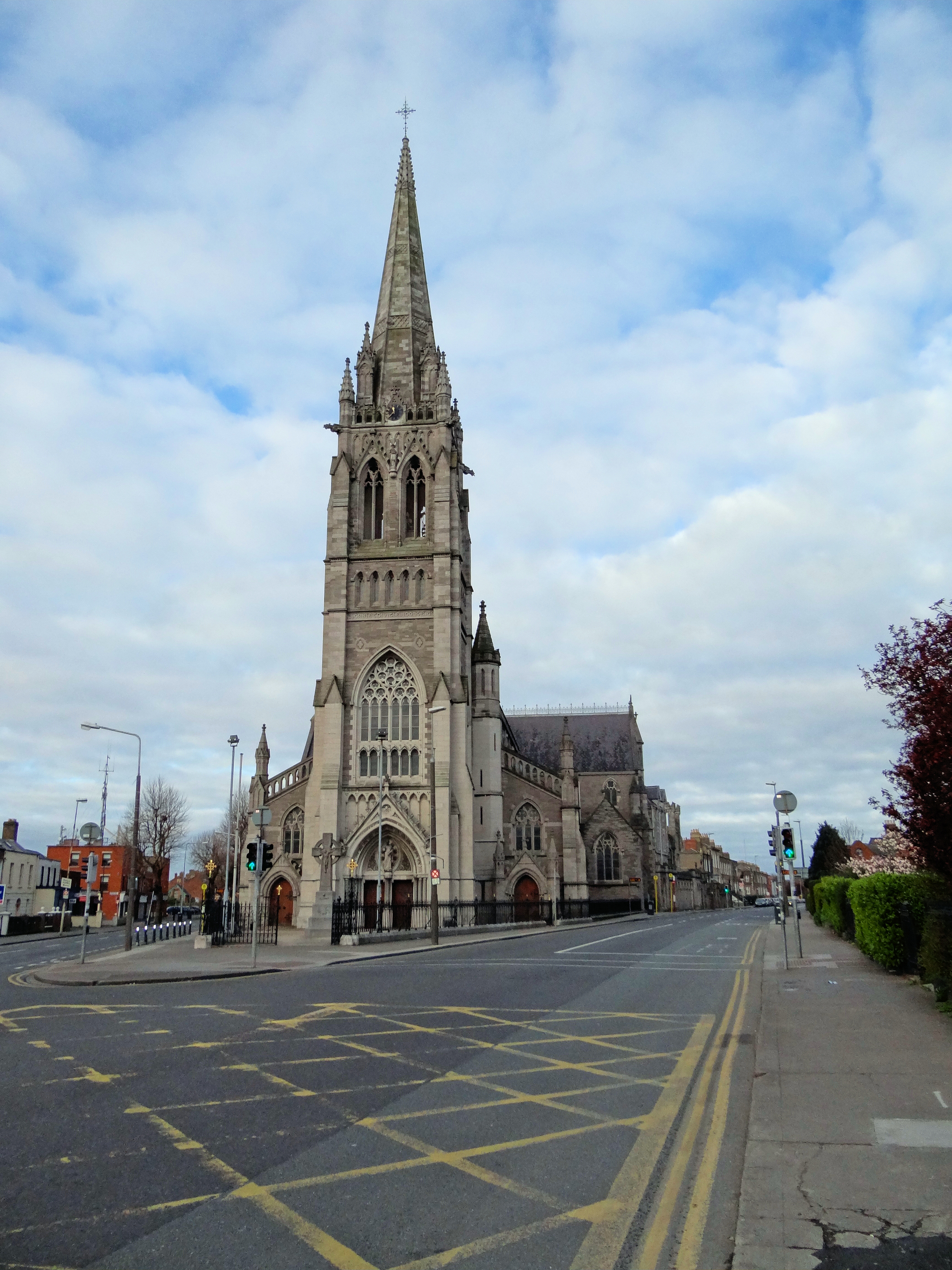
- St Peter's Church, Phibsborough, on the R147

Location
- Country: Ireland

Highway system
- Roads in Ireland; Motorways; Primary; Secondary; Regional

The R147 is a regional road in Ireland. Its first section runs from St Peters Church in Phibsborough, Dublin to its junction with the M50. It then follows the route of a former section of the N3 between Clonee and Kells. It serves as an alternative route for non-motorway traffic and traffic wishing to avoid tolls on the M3.

== Route ==
The official description of the R147 from the Roads Act 1993 (Classification of Regional Roads) Order 2012 reads:

R147: Dublin — Clonee — Navan — Derver, County Meath (Part old National Route 3)

Between its junction with the R135 road at Phibsborough Road in the city of Dublin and its junction with R102 road at River Road in the county of Fingal via North Circular Road, Dalymount, Cabra Road and Navan Road in the city of Dublin: Navan Road, and Castleknock in the county of Fingal:

and

between its junction with M3 at Clonee Bypass in the county of Fingal and its junction with N51 at Inner Relief Road in the town of Navan via Clonee, Loughsallagh, Pace, Piercetown, Dunshaughlin, Cooksland, Ross Cross, Blundelstown, Kilcarn and Kilcarn Road in the county of Meath: Dublin Road and Kells Road in the town of Navan

and

between its junction with N51 at Inner Relief Road and its junction with N3 at Derver in the county of Meath via Kells Road in the town of Navan: Tankardstown, Hurdlestown and Kilmainham in the county of Meath: Headfort Place, John Street, Castle Street, Carrick Street, Lord Edward Street and Cavan Road in the town of Kells and Carnaross in the county of Meath.

== See also ==
- Roads in Ireland
- National primary road
- National secondary road
