= Holywell, County Fermanagh =

Village in County Fermanagh, Northern Ireland

Coordinates: 54.305942°N 7.885427°W

Holywell: Irish: Dabhach Phádraig
- Location within Northern Ireland
- Population: 439 with Belcoo (2021 census)
- District: Fermanagh and Omagh
- County: County Fermanagh
- Country: Northern Ireland
- Sovereign state: United Kingdom
- Post town: ENNISKILLEN
- Postcode district: BT93
- Dialling code: 028
- UK Parliament: Fermanagh and South Tyrone
- NI Assembly: Fermanagh and South Tyrone

Holywell is a small village near Belcoo in County Fermanagh, Northern Ireland. It is within the townlands of Cavancarragh and Rushin. It had a population (with Belcoo) of 439 in the 2021 census. It is part of the Fermanagh and Omagh area.

== See also ==
- List of towns and villages in Northern Ireland
