= Glenfarne =

Village in County Leitrim, Ireland

Glenfarne Gleann Fearna
- Village
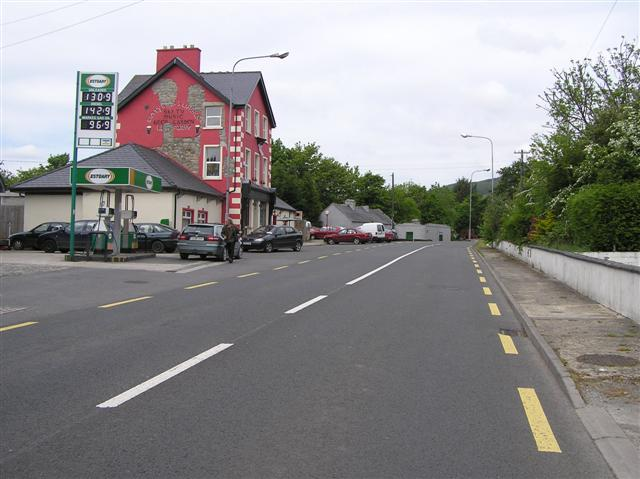
- N16 through village

- Location in Ireland
- Coordinates: 54.28429°N 7.984°W
- Country: Ireland
- Province: Connacht
- County: County Leitrim
- Barony: Drumahaire

Glenfarne or Glenfarn (Irish: Gleann Fearna) is a village in north County Leitrim, Ireland. It is the site of the original 'Ballroom of Romance', which inspired a short story by William Trevor that was subsequently turned into a television film in a BBC/RTÉ co-production. Glenfarne has a lakeside forest near Lough MacNean. The village is located on the N16 (Sligo–Blacklion) road, 13 km east of Manorhamilton.

== History ==
The name of the village is an anglicisation of Gleann-fearna, meaning "valley of the alders". It was referred to by this name in the Annals of the Four Masters as far back as 1235 as a location in West Bréifne and under a further derivation, Clann-Fearmaighe as far back as 1217, where it is cited as "containing 20 quarters of land".

=== Historical remains ===
- Ruins of Glenfarne Hall – in Glenfarne Forest Park, which formed part of the Tottenham estate, the ruins of the old house, Glenfarne Hall, can still be seen. The estate passed from the Tottenhams to Sir Edward Harland (of Harland and Wolff shipbuilders, Queen's Island, Belfast). Sir Edward Harland died at Glenfarne Hall on 24 December 1895. It is said that the flag stones that line the Titanic quay come from quarries in Glenfarne.
- Myles Big Stone – This is thought to have been an ancient place of worship. Nearby is the Fort of Sile O'Reilly which is reputed to have been an ancient burial ground and a famine graveyard for infants.

== Ballroom of Romance ==
The Rainbow Ballroom of Romance lies at a crossroads in the townland of Brockagh Lower along the N16 Blacklion to Sligo road. Opened as McGivern's Dance Hall in 1934 by John McGivern, a Brockagh-born returnee from the United States, it was renovated and renamed the Rainbow Ballroom of Romance in 1952 and during the showband era of the 1950s and 1960s attracted big names in the genre. When driving through Glenfarne in the early 1970s, the writer William Trevor noticed it and was inspired to write his famous short story of emigration and narrow horizons, The Ballroom of Romance. The 1986 BBC/RTÉ television film co-production The Ballroom of Romance, based on the story, was shot in Ballycroy, County Mayo as by then the original Ballroom no longer had its original 1950s interiors. As of 2021, the Ballroom is still a live event venue, reinventing itself in a digital era.

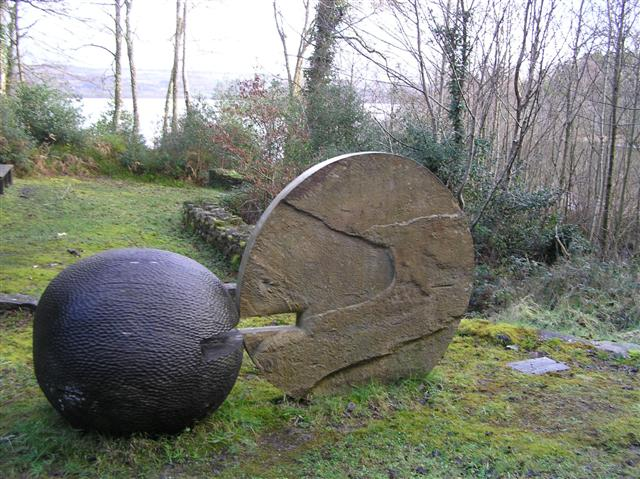
Sculpture in Glenfarne Forest

== Glenfarne Demesne ==
The Glenfarne Demesne lies on the shores of Lough MacNean. The lake marks the border between the counties of Leitrim, Cavan and Fermanagh. In 2000, a cross-border and cross-community arts project was concluded with the aim to promote the bonds between the communities of these three counties through the medium of sculpture and the visual arts. A number of sculptures are still in the Demesne.

== Transport ==
=== Rail ===
Glenfarne railway station was on the Sligo, Leitrim and Northern Counties Railway line from Enniskillen to Sligo. The line opened in 1880 and closed in 1957. The nearest operational station is Sligo railway station.

=== Bus ===
Glenfarne is a stop on Bus Éireann regional routes 458 (Ballina–Enniskillen) and 470.

== See also ==
- List of towns and villages in Ireland
