= A32 road (Northern Ireland) =

Road in Northern Ireland

Coordinates: 54.600305°N 7.298402°W

A32

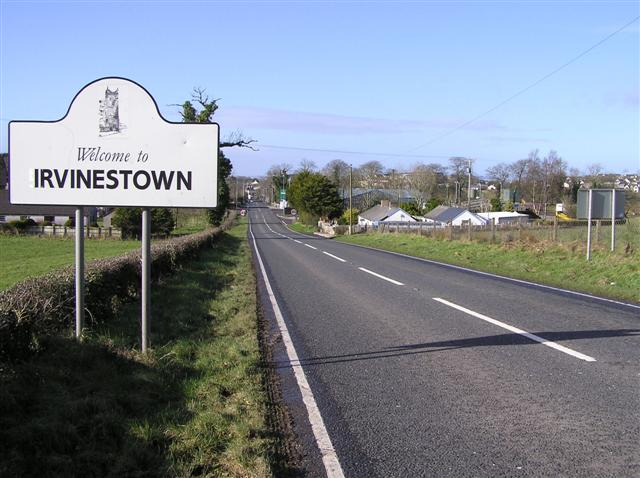
- A32 at Irvinestown

Major junctions
- north end: Omagh
- A5 in Omagh A4 A46 at Enniskillen N87 in Swanlinbar
- south end: Swanlinbar.

Location
- Country: United Kingdom
- Constituent country: Northern Ireland
- Primary destinations: Omagh; Dromore; Irvinestown; Enniskillen; Swanlinbar; Belturbet; Dromod

Road network
- Roads in Northern Ireland; Motorways; A roads in Northern Ireland

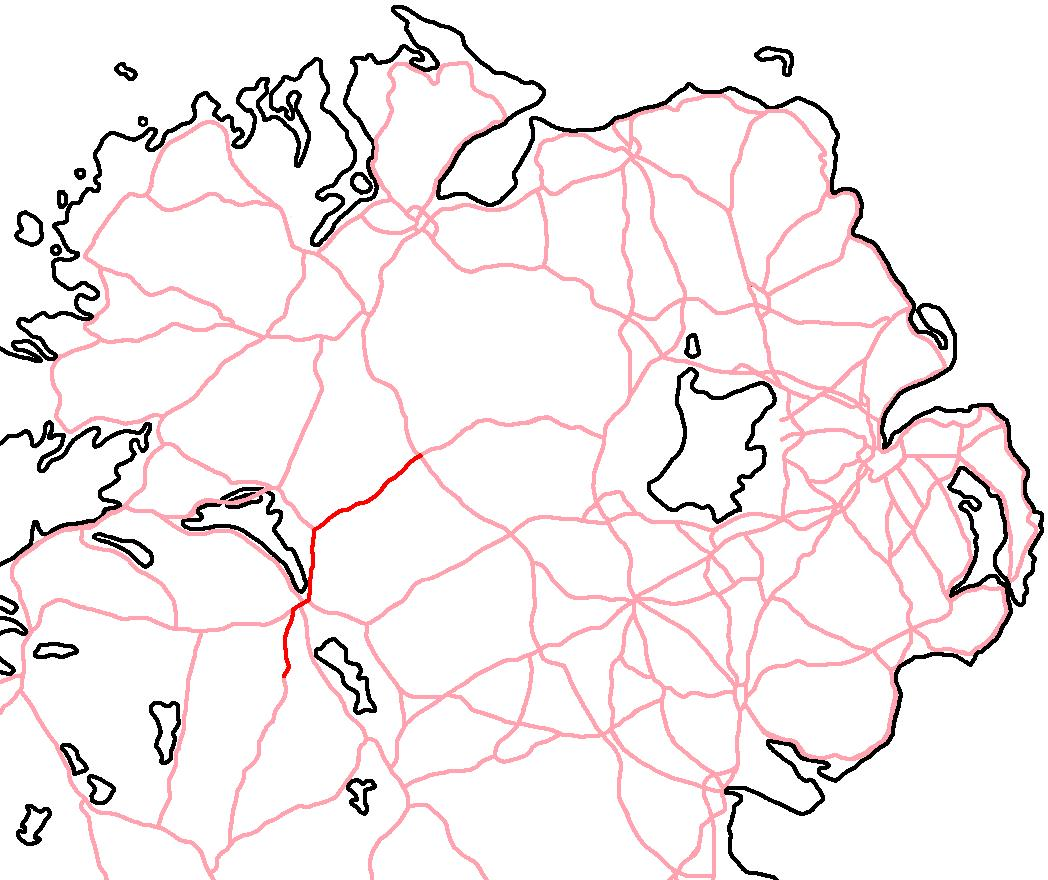
The route of the A32 in red from Omagh (County Tyrone) to Swanlinbar (County Cavan).

The A32 is a route in Northern Ireland connecting Omagh, County Tyrone and Swanlinbar, County Cavan. The road passes through Dromore in Tyrone and the Fermanagh towns of Irvinestown and Enniskillen.

The A32 passes Enniskillen/St Angelo Airport near Lower Lough Erne. At the border, the A32 becomes the N87 in the Republic of Ireland. The Marble Arch Caves are situated close to the section of the road to the south of Enniskillen town near the village of Florencecourt.

Developments, such as carriageway widening and climbing lanes, are installed to the road between Omagh and Enniskillen to facilitate easier access to the South West Acute Hospital near Enniskillen. This section once followed an alignment that saw the route avoid Irvinestown altogether; taking traffic straight from Dromore to Trillick, Kilskeery, and Ballinamallard, before returning to the current road at Trory (close to Enniskillen Airport).

The A32 road from Enniskillen heading towards Swanlinbar becoming the N87 in the Republic of Ireland and continues as the R202 to Dromod which connects with the N4 between Sligo and Dublin.

In Dromod there is a station on the Dublin-Sligo railway line with a two hourly train service between Dublin Connolly and Sligo.
