= Tamnamore =

Village in County Tyrone, Northern Ireland

Coordinates: 54.493°N 6.646°W

Tamnamore: Irish: An Tamhnach Mhór
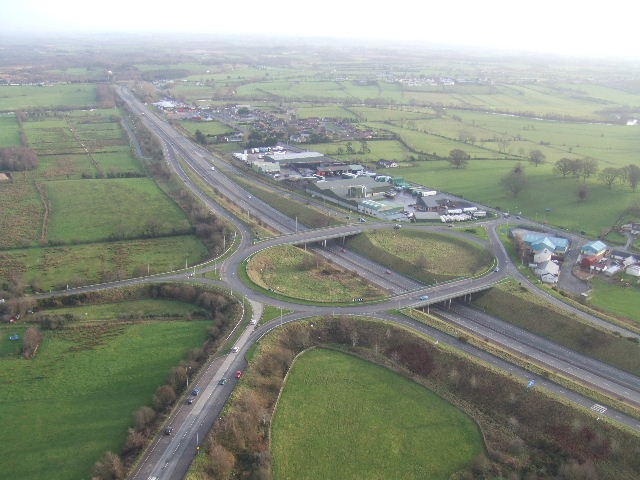
- Tamnamore roundabout

- Location within Northern Ireland
- County: County Tyrone
- Country: Northern Ireland
- Sovereign state: United Kingdom
- Postcode district: BT71
- Dialling code: 028

Tamnamore (from Irish An Tamhnach Mhór, meaning 'the large field') is a small village in County Tyrone, Northern Ireland, beside exit 14 on the M1 motorway, 7 km east of Dungannon. It lies within the townland of Tamlaghtmore in the civil parish of Killyman, the historic barony of Dungannon Middle, and is situated in Dungannon and South Tyrone Borough Council.

Tamnamore Roundabout connects the M1 with the roads to Coalisland, Derrytresk, Maghery and The Moy.

Local facilities include shops, post office and a hotel.
