= N16 road (Ireland) =

Road in Ireland

N16 road
- Bóthar N16
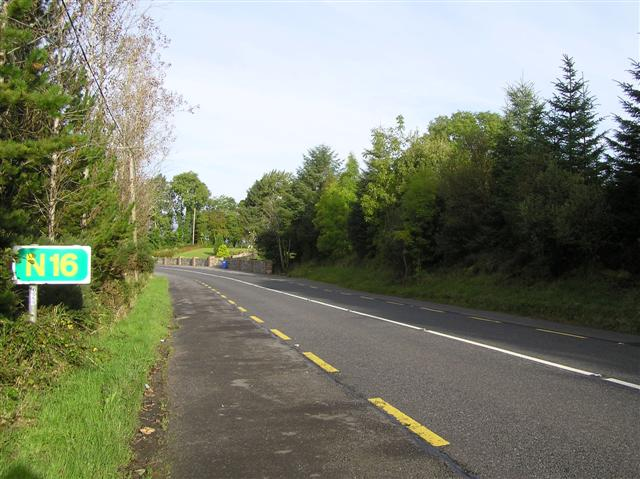
- N16 near Cornacloy in County Leitrim

Route information
- Length: 47.49 km (29.51 mi)

Location
- Country: Ireland
- Primary destinations: County Sligo; Sligo; County Leitrim; Glencar; Manorhamilton; Glenfarne; County Cavan; Loughan House; Blacklion; Northern Ireland A4 in Enniskillen

Highway system
- Roads in Ireland; Motorways; Primary; Secondary; Regional

The N16 road is a national primary road in Ireland. It begins in County Sligo in the northwest of Ireland, and ends at Blacklion, County Cavan, at the border with Northern Ireland, where it becomes the A4 road. At 47.49 kilometres (29.51 mi), The N16 is one of the shorter national primary routes, as it forms only part of a major route from Sligo to Enniskillen and onwards to Belfast.

== Route ==
The N16 begins at the junction of the N15 and N4 at Cartron, Sligo, and travels northeast, past the Institute of Technology, Sligo and onwards, passing above Glencar Lake and entering County Leitrim. Manorhamilton and Glenfarne are the only towns passed through in County Leitrim, until the road reaches Blacklion in County Cavan, and crosses the border into County Fermanagh at Belcoo, where the road becomes the A4. The route continues to Enniskillen and further east towards Belfast as the A4 and the M1 Motorway.

Compared with many other national primary roads in Ireland, long sections of the N16 are narrow and twisty which can make travelling on it slow and difficult. In recent years improvements have been made to short sections of it but the geography of many of the areas it passes through (deep valleys and steep hills) places some limits on the improvements that can be made without a wholesale realignment of parts of the route (i.e., finding less difficult terrain nearby to build a new road through).

As of December 2019, upgrades to further sections of the N16 were planned.

== See also ==
- Roads in Ireland
- Motorways in Ireland
- National secondary road
- Regional road
