= N3 road (Ireland) =

Road in Ireland

N3 road
- Bóthar N3

Route information
- Length: 127.39 km (79.16 mi)

Location
- Country: Ireland
- Primary destinations: (bypassed routes in italics): Fingal; Blanchardstown; Mulhuddart; County Meath; Clonee; Dunshaughlin; Ross Cross; Navan; Kells; Carnaross; County Cavan; Lisduff; Virginia; New Inn; Cavan town; Butlersbridge; Belturbet; Northern Ireland A509 in Enniskillen A46 at Enniskillen; County Donegal; Ballyshannon

Highway system
- Roads in Ireland; Motorways; Primary; Secondary; Regional

The N3 road is a national primary road in the Republic of Ireland, running between Dublin, Cavan and the border with County Fermanagh. The A509 and A46 roads in Northern Ireland form part of an overall route connecting to Enniskillen, and northwest to the border again where the N3 reappears to serve Ballyshannon in County Donegal.

Rush hour congestion between Navan and Dublin city was very heavy (up to 22,000 vehicles per day on single carriageway portions of the N3 in 2002), and problems occurred at most built-up areas between these points. A tolled motorway bypass replacement, the M3 motorway, was opened to traffic on 4 June 2010.

The former section from its junction with the M50 to Dublin city centre, as well as the bypassed section from Clonee to the border with County Cavan, have been reclassified as the R147 road.

== Route ==
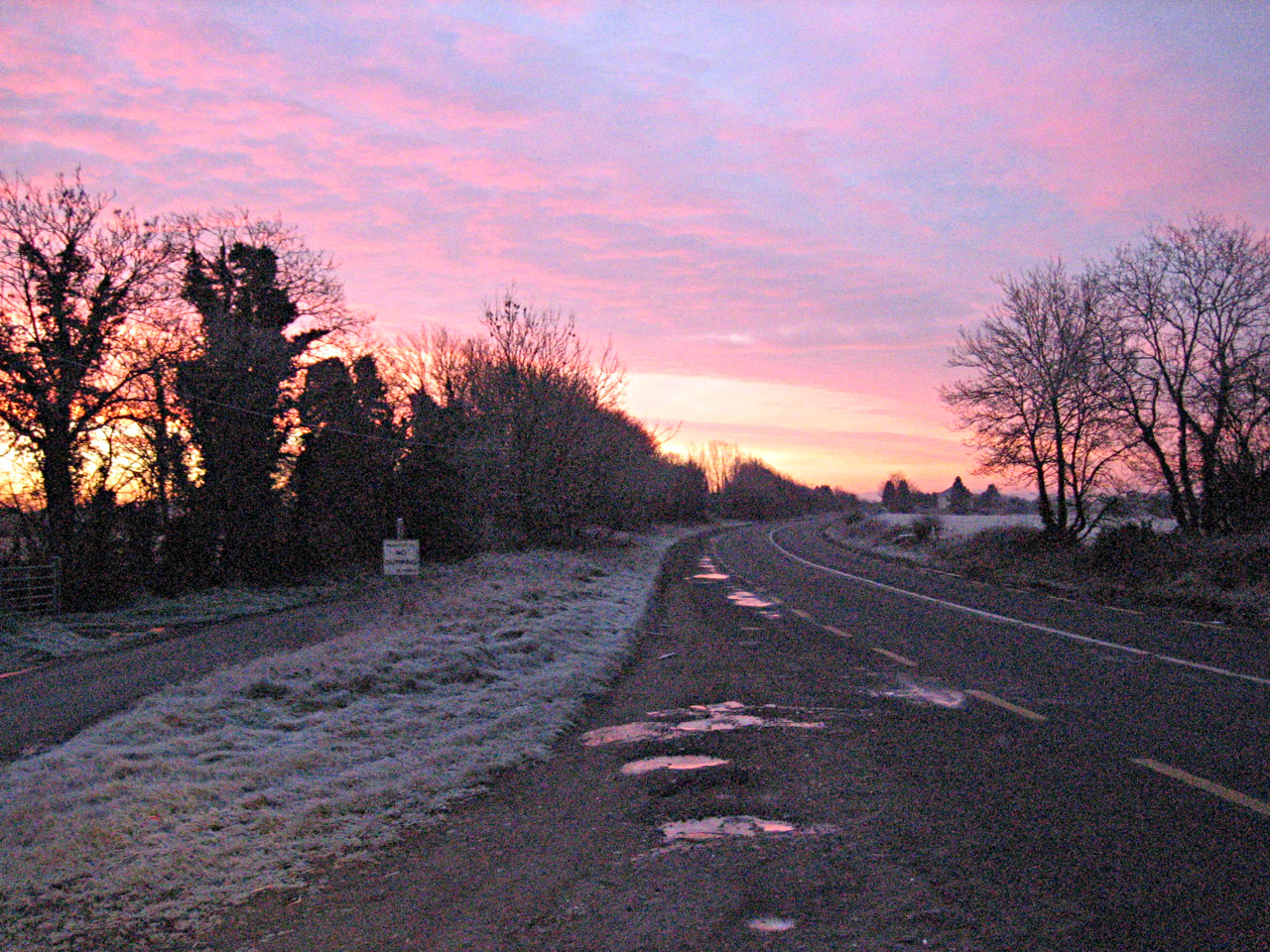
The old N3, between Clonee and Dunshaughlin

The route, known as the Navan Road as it leaves Dublin, starts at its junction with the M50 motorway (junction 6), bypassing Blanchardstown, Mulhuddart and Clonee with a dual carriageway opened in November 1992. The dual carriageway changes into the M3 motorway near the Meath border bypassing Dunshaughlin and Navan. Near Kells the route continues as the N3 dual carriageway to the border with County Cavan. It then passes through Virginia, past Cavan and continues past Butlersbridge and Belturbet.

The route then crosses the border into Northern Ireland at the Senator George Mitchell Peace Bridge (also known as Aghalane Bridge), which spans the Woodford River (Irish: Sruth Gráinne), crossing into County Fermanagh where it becomes the A509, continuing on to Enniskillen. The A46 (known as the Lough Shore Road) connects Enniskillen and the County Donegal border, becoming the N3 across the border at Belleek, and connecting to Ballyshannon. In Ballyshannon certain road signs have destinations A46 Enniskillen with N3 Dublin with the requisite single arrow pointing in the same direction.

== History ==
During The Troubles in Northern Ireland, the border crossing at Aghalane Bridge, which spanned the Woodford River just north of Belturbet, was closed. Aghalane Bridge crossed from County Cavan into County Fermanagh. The bridge was targeted by Loyalist paramilitaries and finally left impassable in 1973. The shortest route was along the N87 and A32 via Swanlinbar. The crossing was reopened in 1999 when a new bridge, named after US Senator George Mitchell, was built beside the old Aghalane Bridge.

== N3 upgrade ==
The National Roads Authority in conjunction with Cavan and Donegal County Councils plan major improvements to the N3 route in Ulster.

A 6.7 kilometre bypass of the town of Belturbet in County Cavan was partially opened to traffic on 2 August 2013, and the entire section including a bridge over the River Erne was opened in December 2013.

== M3 motorway ==
M3 motorway
- Mótarbhealach M3
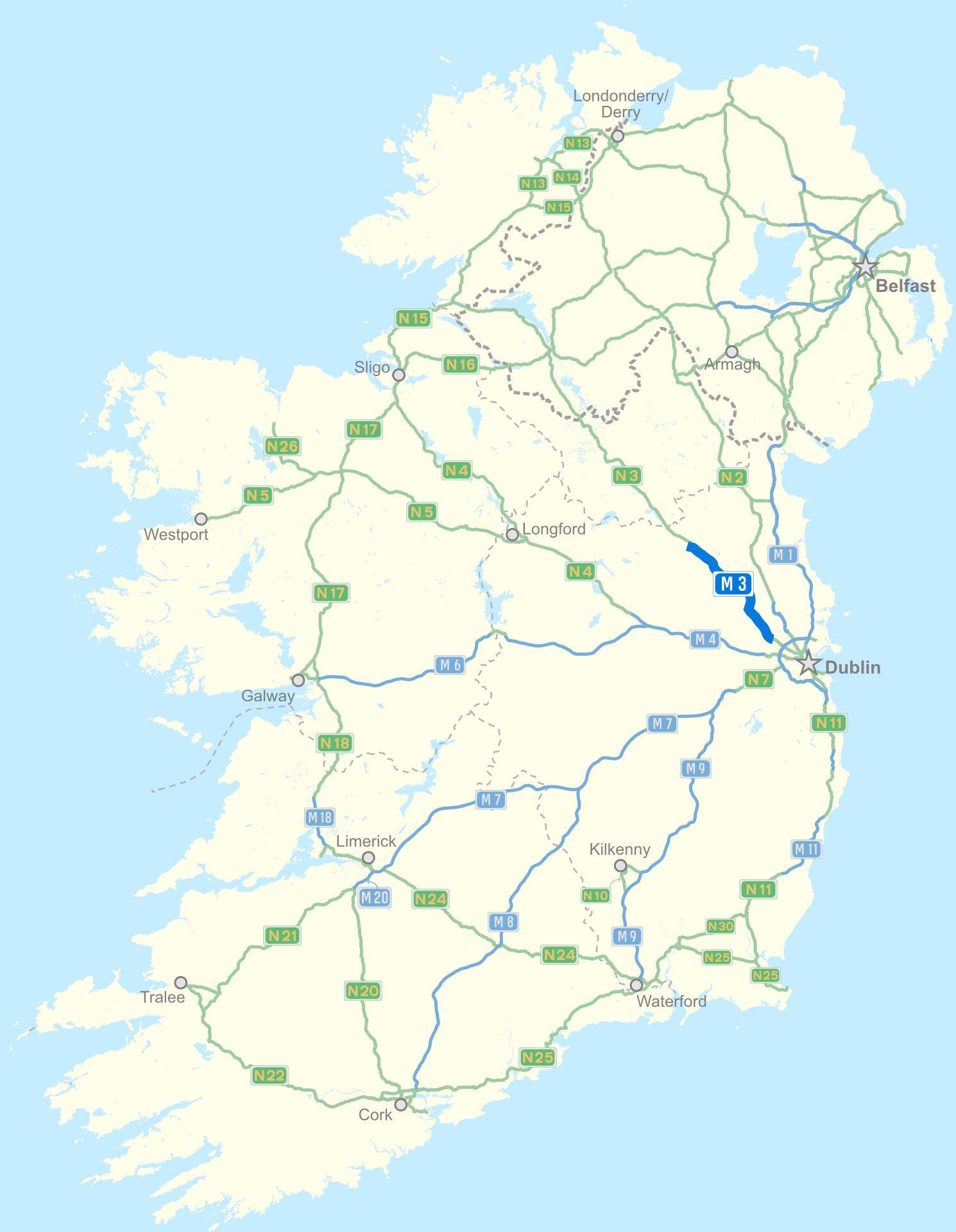
- Clickable image

Route information
- Length: 51 km (32 mi)
- Existed: 2007–present
- History: Completed in 2010

Major junctions
- From: Mulhuddart, County Dublin
- J9 → N51 road J11 → N52 road
- To: Kells, County Meath

Location
- Country: Ireland
- Primary destinations: Dunboyne, Dunshaughlin, Navan, Kells

Highway system
- Roads in Ireland; Motorways; Primary; Secondary; Regional

Part of the old N3 route has been bypassed by the construction of 51 kilometres of new motorway. This stretch of motorway, designated M3, was opened on 4 June 2010. The M3 begins near the end of the dual carriageway outside Clonee and terminates south west of Kells just before the N52. The works were carried out by a joint venture of Ferrovial and SIAC (a local contractor).

The construction scheme did not terminate at this point as a new realigned N3 2+2 non-motorway section continued from the end of the Motorway past Kells before terminating near the County Cavan border. The overall scheme also included the N52 Kells northern bypass. Since completion, the M3 now bypasses Dunshaughlin, Navan, and Kells along with Cavan which was bypassed much earlier.

=== Controversy ===
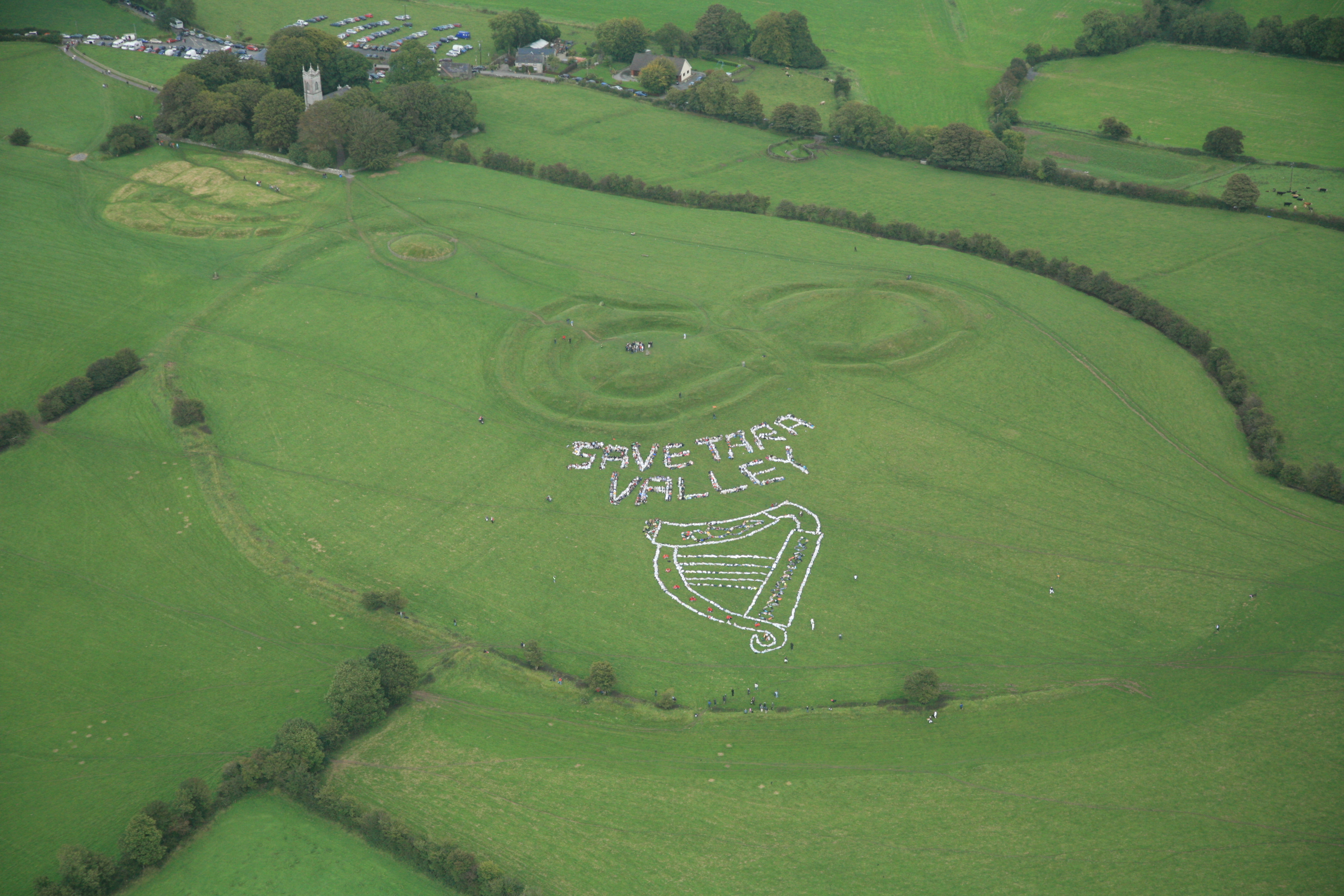
Protestors gathered at the Hill of Tara to protest against the construction of the new motorway.

The motorway was contested because the route passes near the Hill of Tara and through the archaeologically rich Tara-Skryne valley or Gabhra. The planned route corridor was approved by An Bord Pleanála (Ireland's planning appeals board) in August 2003.

=== Motorway reclassification ===
On 30 September 2008, the Department of Transport announced the second round of proposed motorway reclassifications under the Roads Act 2007. A short section of the existing dual-carriageway N3 bypassing Clonee, from northwest of Mulhuddart to the start of the M3 toll motorway scheme, is affected by this. Following a public consultation process, on 10 July 2009 the Minister for Transport, Noel Dempsey, made a Statutory Instrument reclassifying this section of the N3 as motorway effective from 28 August 2009. It was the first section of M3 to come into being.

=== Motorway project details ===
- The most expensive single contract road project ever undertaken in Ireland coming in at approximately €650 million according to SIAC.
- It is tolled at two locations, one point north of Navan and another point between Dunshaughlin and Clonee for 45 years running from 2007. The Government have the option to buy out this contract at any time. The price level of tolls are controlled by the Board of the NRA and they can reduce, increase or remove the tolls as they see appropriate. Should they lower the tolls on the M3 the government would have to make up the difference of what is owed yearly to Eurolink M3 Ltd through tax revenue.
- An expected minimum traffic level, growing year-on-year, was agreed as part of the contract, with "Variable Operational Payments" made in lieu of toll revenue to Eurolink M3 if this figure was not reached. These payments were made every year from opening until 2019, with traffic below predicted levels; but it is now expected that no further payments will be required due to traffic growth
- It is the longest single road project ever to be constructed in Ireland including nearly 100 kilometres of new or upgraded road including 49 km of new M3, 10 km of new N3, 20 km of new link roads and interchanges, and approximately 15 kilometres of local road improvements, footpaths, cycle lanes and new bridges.
- It was originally planned to open in 2006.
- An Bord Pleanála initially approved the project on 22 August 2003. Exactly 4 years later, on 22 August 2007, they directed that the excavation of the Lismullin monument did not require fresh planning approval.

== Junctions ==
The route begins as a dual carriageway at junction 6 of the M50, becoming a motorway after junction 4. It then becomes a dual carriageway after the motorway which terminates at Kells.

County	km	mi	Junction	Destinations	Notes
County Dublin
County Dublin	0.5	0.3	1	M50 – Dublin Airport, Dublin Port, Dún Laoghaire, Wexford	Continues as R147 towards Dublin city centre.
County Dublin	1	0.6		Castleknock, Blanchardstown Village	Connolly Hospital; Northbound entrance and southbound exit only.
County Dublin	1.5	0.9	2	R843 – Blanchardstown Village, Ballycoolin	Northbound exit and southbound entrance only.
County Dublin	3	1.9	3	R121 – Blanchardstown Centre, Mulhuddart	Blanchardstown Village (southbound).
County Dublin	4.5	2.8		Ballycoolin, Tyrellstown, Mulhuddart	Hollystown; Left-in/left-out junction. Southbound entrance and exit only.
County Dublin	5.5	3.4	4	R156 – Clonee, Damastown, Dunboyne	Junction is split across county boundary. Continues as M3 motorway.
County Meath	7	4.3	4	R156 – Clonee, Damastown, Dunboyne	Junction is split across county boundary. Continues as M3 motorway.
County Meath	10	6.2	5	R157 – Dunboyne, Ratoath (R155)	Trim (R154), Park and Ride
County Meath	12	7.5	M3 Southern Toll		
County Meath	20.5	12.7	6	R125 ‒ Dunshaughlin, Trim	Kilcock (R154)
County Meath	32.5	20.2	7	R147 ‒ Skryne, Johnstown, Navan (northbound); Skryne, Kilmessan (southbound)	
County Meath	37.5	23.3	8	R147 ‒ Navan (South)	
County Meath	42.5	26.4	9	N51 ‒ Delvin, Navan (North)	Athboy, Navan Hospital
County Meath	47	29.2	M3 Northern Toll		
County Meath	53.5	33.2	10	R147 ‒ Kells (South)	
County Meath	56.5	35.1		N52 ‒ Mullingar, Delvin, Dundalk R147 ‒ Kells	Motorway terminates at roundabout. Junction number not signposted. Continues as N3 dual carriageway.
1.000 mi = 1.609 km; 1.000 km = 0.621 mi: Incomplete access; Tolled; Route transition

== See also ==
- Roads in Ireland
- Motorways in Ireland
- National secondary road
- Regional road
- National Development Plan
- History of roads in Ireland
- Transport Infrastructure Ireland
