= Belcoo =

Village in County Fermanagh, Northern Ireland

Coordinates: 54.296°N 7.871°W

Belcoo: Irish: Béal Cú
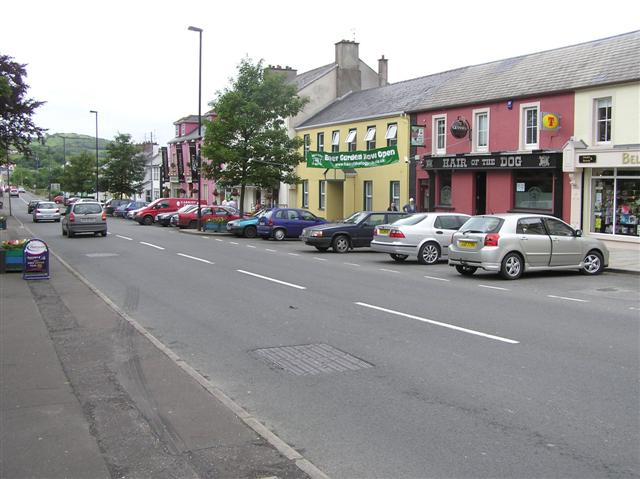

- Location within Northern Ireland
- Population: 439 (2021 census)
- District: Fermanagh and Omagh
- County: County Fermanagh
- Country: Northern Ireland
- Sovereign state: United Kingdom
- Post town: ENNISKILLEN
- Postcode district: BT93
- Dialling code: 028
- UK Parliament: Fermanagh and South Tyrone
- NI Assembly: Fermanagh and South Tyrone

Belcoo (/bɛlˈkuː/ (from Irish Béal Cú, meaning 'mouth of the narrow [stretch of water]') is a village and townland in County Fermanagh, Northern Ireland, 10 miles (16 km) from Enniskillen. It is on the County Fermanagh/County Cavan border beside the village of Blacklion in the Republic of Ireland. It had a population (with Holywell) of 439 in the 2021 census. It is situated within the Fermanagh and Omagh District.

The Lough MacNean Tourism Initiative has been in operation since 2003, and is an economy building project, aimed at addressing tourism needs in the area while promoting cross-border relations. Belcoo Enterprise Ltd opened in 1992 in units shared with the Belcoo Historical Society, a doctor's surgery, a chiropodist and Lakeland Community Care. The Mullycovet corn mill, which functioned from 1830 until the 1920s, is being restored. The Indigenous Resources School of Transferable Skills aims to teach marginalised groups including the unemployed, New Age travellers, disabled people, to use natural materials as a learning facility.

== History ==
The earliest mention of the village is in the old Ulster Saga "Argain Belcon Breifne" also known as "Togail Bruidne Bélchon Bréifne" (Massacre of Belcu Brefne). This tells the tale of a trap set for the great Ulster hero Conall Cernach by a Breifne chief named Belcu Brefne. However Conall manages to reverse the trap and causes Belcu's sons to kill Belcu by mistake. The place where the tale occurs was later named Belcu or sometimes Belcon in honour of Belcu. Isaac Butler in his book "A Journey to Lough Derg" written in c. 1749 states-

At Bell Con in this Neighbourhood on the road to Sligo is a famous Well called Davagh Patrick, or the holy Well it is found by repeated Experience to be the best Cold Bath in the Kingdom, having received Numbers in nervous & paralitic Disorders, & is coming into great request, it is exceeding transparent & so intensely cold that it throws one into a shaking Fit by putting one's hand into it, it exhibits a Stream that turns 2 mills at 150 Yards from the Spring. In April & May succeeding the great Frost in 1740 happened an Accident that gave Birth to a Miracle at this Spring but they could not ascribe the Saint without it was St. Patrick; the water was changed into the Color of Milk & as it was of a fine solf nature it quickly gained the repute of being milk by the Vulgar who flockt from all parts to see it they could not be convinced to the Contrary until it ceased, it continued 7 Weeks. Father O Mulloy thus accounted for it, that the adjacent lands were full of marly bottoms, that this Spring having it's Channel thro those beds of Marl, upon the breaking of the Frost, the marl was loosened & fell into the Spring and gave it the tincture which subsiding it returned to its usual Transparency & then the Wonder ceased."

See "Dabhach Phádraig: St Patrick's Holy Well, Belcoo, County Fermanagh", by Mairead O'Dolain, in the Clogher Record, Volume 18, No. 1, pp. 103–116. (viewable on JSTOR).

A modern interpretation however states that the name of the village derives from the Irish: béal meaning mouth and cumhang or cung meaning narrowing, referring to the village's position on a narrow neck of water (river) between Upper and Lower Lough MacNean. This interpretation is given support, firstly in the 14th century Book of Magauran where it is mentioned several times as Cunga, secondly in an Inquisition held at Dromahair on 22 July 1607 which described the boundaries of County Leitrim inter alia as- and so to Beallacowngamore, and then to Beallucowngabegg, and thirdly by the name of the place on the 1609 Ulster Plantation map where it is named 'Kiliconge', i.e. Coille Cunga meaning "The Wood of the Narrow Strip of Land". The townland to the immediate north of Belcoo continues this interpretation as it is called Drumcoo, i.e. The Hill of the Narrow Strip of Land. Another often used derivation is Béal Cú i.e. where Cú is the word for hound. Hence the village name would mean "The Mouth of the Hound". Máire MacNeill in her book "The Festival of Lughnasa", 1962, gives a local Belcoo folktale about balefire coming out of a hound's mouth before it is killed by Saint Patrick. This tale is also found in Glangevlin folktales.

In the Irish Rebellion of 1641, the English Army erected a fort at Belcoo which can be seen on the Down Survey maps of 1655. When the Irish surrendered at Cavan on 27 April 1653, paragraph 7 of the Articles of Surrender stated-"That Collonel Reily with the partie now with him on the west side of Loughern lay downe their armes, and deliver such forts in the islands, with all the amunicion and provision therein that is in his powre, at or before the 18 May next, at Crohan, and Collonel Hugh Me Guier's regiment to lay downe their armes the 18 May next, at 'Belcowe fort', in the county of Fermanagh, and all others of his partie included in these articles are to lay downe their armes in the severall counties where their quarters are, in such places as the Governors of the several counties shall apoynt." The fort was still in existence in 1700, as an entry in the Calendar of Treasury Books dated 1 June 1700 states there was "1 foot soldier at Belcoe who receives an allowance of £14 per annum in respect of fire and candle for the Barracks"

In Seamus Pender's "A Census of Ireland, Circa 1659", the village is called "Belcow".

In 1718, John Dolan of Fermanagh wrote- About ye middle of Lough Earn there is but a small arm like a large river for about an English mile and over this arm is a fine large ford called Belcoo, whereon stands a barrack on ye north side; and on ye south side of this a skirt of ye county Cavan borders ye said lough. Near Belcoo is a holy well consecrated by St Patrick wherein are miracles yearly wrought upon devout persons by performing their stations with true devotion are often restored to sight and limb and of other distempers by virtue of ye said water and by ye grace of God, (pp. 134–136, viewable on JSTOR).

In his book "Upper Lough Erne", written in 1739, Reverend William Henry states, "Lough Macnane ... is contracted into a narrow, deep canal, in which form it flows through a flat meadow for half a mile to the redoubt of Bellcoe, where is a good ford and a new bridge across it. From the ford, the lake, expanding again, continues for three miles more".

Matthew Sleater's Directory of 1806 states "Belcoo-bridge (which leads to Garrison in Fermanagh County) over a river containing the two lakes called Lough Macnean, which extends along this road 6 miles".

About two miles north-east of Belcoo is Gardenhill, an old derelict homestead. It is located on the side of a hill in Gardenhill townland, just off the sideroad from Belcoo to Boho. Parts of this old homestead possibly date from the early years of the Plantation of Ulster in the early seventeenth-century. It was rented, and later owned, by the Hassard family for around 300 years. Gardenhill is privately owned and is not open to the public.

=== 20th century ===
With the Partition of Ireland in 1921, Belcoo became a border village. On 28 March 1922, in the aftermath of the Irish War of Independence, a column of fifty Irish Republican Army volunteers crossed from County Cavan and seized the Royal Irish Constabulary barracks in Belcoo after a three-hour battle. Fifteen RIC officers were captured and marched across the border and held until 18 July.

Belcoo was one of several Catholic border villages in Fermanagh that would have been transferred to the Irish Free State had the recommendations of the Irish Boundary Commission been enacted in 1925.

== Transport ==
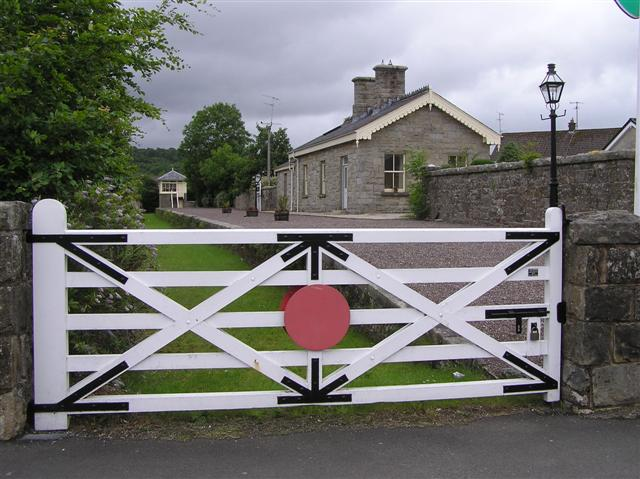
Restored level crossing gates, platform and station building, now a private residence.

Belcoo is situated on the A4 road from Enniskillen, at the point where it reaches the border with the Republic of Ireland and becomes the N16 to Sligo. Buses on the Enniskillen to Bundoran Ulsterbus Service 64, operated by Translink, stop here.

The village formerly had a small railway station on the railway line serving Sligo, County Leitrim and Enniskillen. In 1878 a stationmaster's house and six houses were built for railway workers and their families and the following year the Sligo, Leitrim and Northern Counties Railway line opened with Belcoo station serving both Belcoo and Blacklion, hence the full name "Belcoo and Blacklion". The station opened on 18 March 1879, and closed on 1 October 1957. The last trains ran through the station on 20 September 1957.

Bus Éireann calls at Belcoo on the service Sligo-Manorhamilton-Enniskillen Expressway route 66.

== 2011 Census ==
On Census Day (27 March 2011) the usually resident population of Belcoo / Holywell Settlement was 540 accounting for 0.03% of the NI total.

- 100.00% were from the white (including Irish Traveller) ethnic group;
- 89.44% belong to or were brought up in the Catholic religion and 7.22% belong to or were brought up in a 'Protestant and Other Christian (including Christian related)' religion; and
- 12.04% indicated that they had a British national identity, 61.67% had an Irish national identity and 25.74% had a Northern Irish national identity*.
- 24.42% had some knowledge of Irish;
- 3.08% had some knowledge of Ulster-Scots; and
- 1.73% did not have English as their first language.

== People ==
- Brendan Dolan, darts player

== See also ==
- List of places in County Fermanagh
