= Derrylin =

Village in County Fermanagh, Northern Ireland

Coordinates: 54.1962°N 7.5715°W

Derrylin: Irish: Doire Loinn
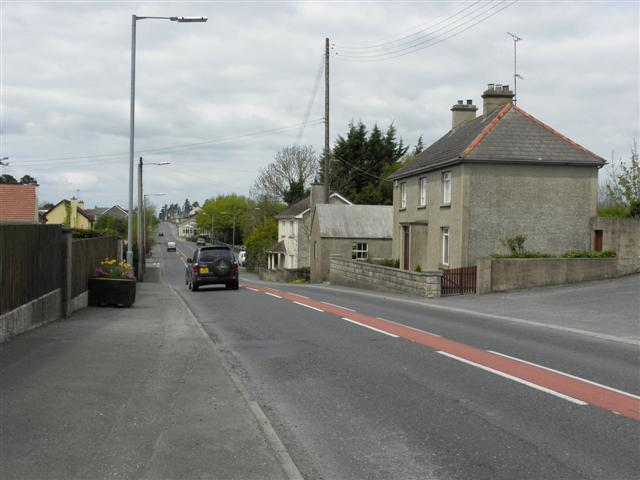
- Main Street

- Location within Northern Ireland
- Population: 634 (2011 Census)
- Irish grid reference: H273282
- District: Fermanagh and Omagh
- County: County Fermanagh
- Country: Northern Ireland
- Sovereign state: United Kingdom
- Postcode district: BT92
- Dialling code: 02867
- UK Parliament: Fermanagh and South Tyrone
- NI Assembly: Fermanagh and South Tyrone

Derrylin (from Irish Doire Loinn or Floinn, meaning 'Oakgrove of Floinn' or "Oakgrove of the blackbirds") is a village and townland in County Fermanagh, Northern Ireland. It is on the A509 road between Enniskillen and the border with County Cavan (the N3 road to Dublin). It had a population of 634 in the 2011 census and is situated within Fermanagh and Omagh district.

== History ==
The village has several historical features, including the Callowhill graveyard with headstones dating back to the 17th century. Upper Lough Erne is east of the village, and west is the peak of Slieve Rushen. To the northeast is the limestone hill known as Knockninny Rock (from which the Catholic parish and the Civil Barony takes its name).

=== Corratrasna Castle ===
On the southern slope of Knockninny Hill, about a mile north of Derrylin village, can be seen the ruins of Corratrasna Castle (or Corratrasna House), a relatively small fortified house that was probably built around 1611, at the start of the Plantation of Ulster. The 'castle' was probably built for a branch of the Balfour family, a Scottish settler family who were based at Castle Balfour in nearby Lisnaskea. However, there is a local tradition that claims the 'castle' was built around 1611 for Brian Maguire, a member of the Clan Mac Uidhir (or Maguire dynasty), Gaelic Lords of Fermanagh.

Another local tradition, recorded by the Irish Office of the Ordnance Survey in the 1830s, states that the 'castle' may have been built for Dr William Bedell, who served as the Church of Ireland Bishop of Kilmore in the 1630s and early 1640s. The ruins of the fortified house now sit in a small field, directly behind a modern farmhouse, just off a sideroad in the townland of Corratrasna, quite near Knockninny Methodist Church.

== Transport ==
Derrylin is a stop on the Donegal-Enniskillen-Cavan-Dublin Airport-Dublin Bus Éireann Expressway route 30 and 30X which run alternatively. There is a coach in each direction every ninety minutes during the day as well as an overnight journey making 13 in all. Recent changes to the route mean that only the 30 bus stops in the village so in effect there is a 3-hour gap in stops. Services operate daily including Sundays. Ulsterbus route 58 from Enniskillen to Belturbet via Kinawley also serves Derrylin several times a day Mondays to Saturdays.

== Economy ==
Derrylin is home to one of Fermanagh's largest industrial facilities, namely the Mannok cement plant, which manufactures a wide range of building products such as cement, pre-stressed concrete units, rooftiles, ready mix concrete and tarmac. It also manufactures insulation products and is involved in packaging and manufacture of plastic containers. Products are exported world wide and it is not unusual for a Derrylin exile on a building site in London or New York to handle a bag of cement or an insulation panel made by a relative from their native village. A glass plant also located in the village, is run by Encirc, which provides bottles for the drinks industry. Every bottle used by Baileys Liqueur is manufactured in the glass plant in Derrylin. The businesses employ about 2000 people locally.

There is an extensive range of small family-run businesses and local services in the village, including garages and fuel supplies, supermarkets, convenience stores, off licences, hair and beauty parlours, opticians, accountants, pharmacy, medical centre, dentists, childcare, churches and sheltered housing for senior citizens. The village has a post office, located in the Spar Supermarket and a thriving Credit Union office on the main street, as well as a Bureau de Change nearby.

== Education ==
Derrylin is home to St Aidan's High School and St Ninnidh's Primary School and Kindertee Community Playgroup.

== Sport ==
Historically Some of the First GAA clubs in Fermanagh and Cavan, and Ulster, were located in the Derrylin/Ballyconnell and surrounding Areas. At one stage before World War I(When Derrylin had a fairly high population) there were as many as 5 teams in the Derrylin area itself. "Knockninney Harps" A Team that existed in the 1920s and 1930s won 2 County Senior Championships with a team that included the McDonnell Brothers. Some time later, due mainly to emigration, there was no team in Derrylin and star players such as Paddy Maguire and Sonny Gunn instead played for Lisnaskea, who were a very successful team from the 1930 through to the 1950s. Derrylin is the current home place of Derrylin O'Connells GAA Club which fields teams at all age groups up to adult. Currently there are eight teams registered. The club crest features a Blackbird perched on an oak leaf (reflecting the village nomenclature). A ladies football team called Knockninny Gaels is also based there. In 2023 a fully lit one kilometre tarmac walking track was constructed around the perimeter of the club grounds in O’Connell Park. The Erne Boxing Club has its training facility in the village and the recently organised Rock Runners cross community athletic club currently uses the facilities of the GAA Club. The village also hosts an underage hurling club called Naomh Aodhan GAC.

== Demographics ==
=== 2011 Census ===
On Census Day (27 March 2011) the usually resident population of Derrylin Settlement was 634 accounting for 0.04% of the NI total. Of which:

- 98.90% were from the white (including Irish Traveller) ethnic group;
- 87.85% belong to or were brought up in the Catholic religion and 10.41% belong to or were brought up in a 'Protestant and Other Christian (including Christian related)' religion; and
- 12.62% indicated that they had a British national identity, 52.05% had an Irish national identity and 26.50% had a Northern Irish national identity.
- 19.02% had some knowledge of Irish;
- 3.06% had some knowledge of Ulster-Scots; and
- 11.38% did not have English as their first language.
