= Deele College =

School in County Donegal, Ireland

Deele College, formerly Raphoe Vocational School, is a mixed non-denominational secondary school in Raphoe, County Donegal, Ireland. The population of the school is roughly about 800 students and 50 teachers.

== History ==
In 1958, the provision of another school in Raphoe in addition to the existing Royal School was recommended. This would eventually become Raphoe Vocational School, which opened on 29 March 1965 (by the Minister for Local Government at the time, Neil Blaney, T.D.) on two acres and on which the school stands today, albeit with a further seven acres added to it on which the school building was extended in 1985.

The school was later renamed Deele College, being renamed after the Burn Dale, which is also known as the Burn Deele or the River Deele, a 'burn' which flows about two miles to the south of Raphoe. The Burn Dale flows on through Ballindrait, and enters the River Foyle about a mile north-north-east of Lifford Bridge.

One of the highlights for Deele College in recent years came in November 2002, when Her Excellency Mary McAleese, President of Ireland, visited the school. Other such visitors to the school have included Nobel Prize–winning politician John Hume and former head of Coca-Cola and television personality Sir Gerry Robinson . Students who have attended the school have gone on to many in third level institutions all across the Republic of Ireland and the United Kingdom in recent years.

== Facilities ==
The school contains first class sporting facilities with a gym, three pitches (one of which is astroturfed). Prefabricated Accommodation was erected at the school in 2008. A school library was constructed in 2009 and a new staff room is to be completed in 2010

Due to increasing number of students attending Deele College, provision has been approved for a new extension to the school, costing approximately €3 million. The new extension will consist of 2 new floors added to the school, linked via a corridor connecting to the old school building. New science facilities, art room and computer labs are just a few of the many facilities that will be provided. In January 2013, the design plans were complete and approved by the Department of Education and Skills. The extension also provides a fitness suite for the adjoining sports hall. The extension was officially opened in May 2016 by Joe McHugh, T.D..

== Alumni ==
- Tyler Toland (b. 2001) - professional footballer; Blackburn Rovers W.F.C.
