= R264 road (Ireland) =

Road in Ireland

Coordinates: 54.860066°N 7.546399°W

R264 road
- Bóthar R264
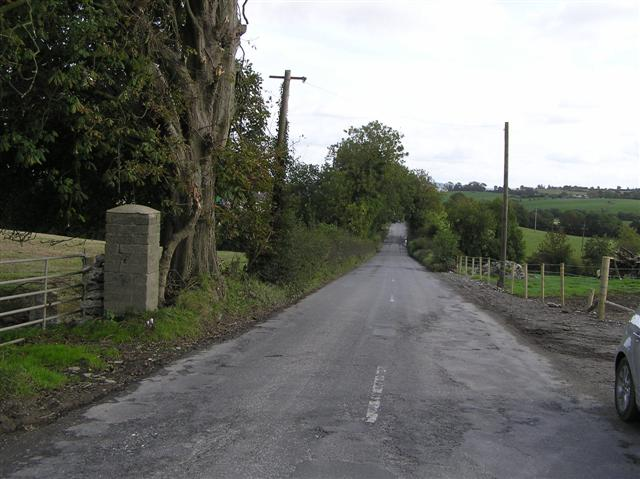
- The Lifford Road, part of the R264

Route information
- Length: 7.9 km (4.9 mi)

Major junctions
- From: R236 Raphoe
- To: N14 Drumboy (northwest of Lifford)

Location
- Country: Ireland

Highway system
- Roads in Ireland; Motorways; Primary; Secondary; Regional

The R264 road is a regional road in Ireland, located in County Donegal in Ulster. It runs between Raphoe and Lifford. The road passes through the village of Ballindrait, where it crosses over the Burn Dale.
