= Royal School =

Royal School may refer to:

- Schools founded by King James VI & I in Ulster in the early 17th century:
  - The Royal School, Armagh, County Armagh
  - Portora Royal School, Enniskillen, County Fermanagh
  - Royal School Dungannon, County Tyrone
  - The Royal School Cavan, County Cavan
  - The Royal and Prior School, in Raphoe, County Donegal, created by a 1971 merger of the Royal School in Raphoe and the Prior School in Lifford
- Founded by King Charles I elsewhere in Ireland:
  - Banagher Royal School, County Offaly
  - Carysfort Royal School, County Wicklow
- Royal School for Daughters of Officers of the Army, Bath, England
- The Royal School, Hampstead, London, England
- The Royal School, Haslemere, Surrey, England
- The Royal School, Wolverhampton, West Midlands, England
- Royal School (Hawaii), Honolulu, Oahu, Kingdom of Hawaii, established 1839

== See also ==
- Royal Grammar School (disambiguation)
- Royal High School (disambiguation)
