= A5 road (Northern Ireland) =

Road in Northern Ireland

Coordinates: 54.6185°N 7.3317°W

A5

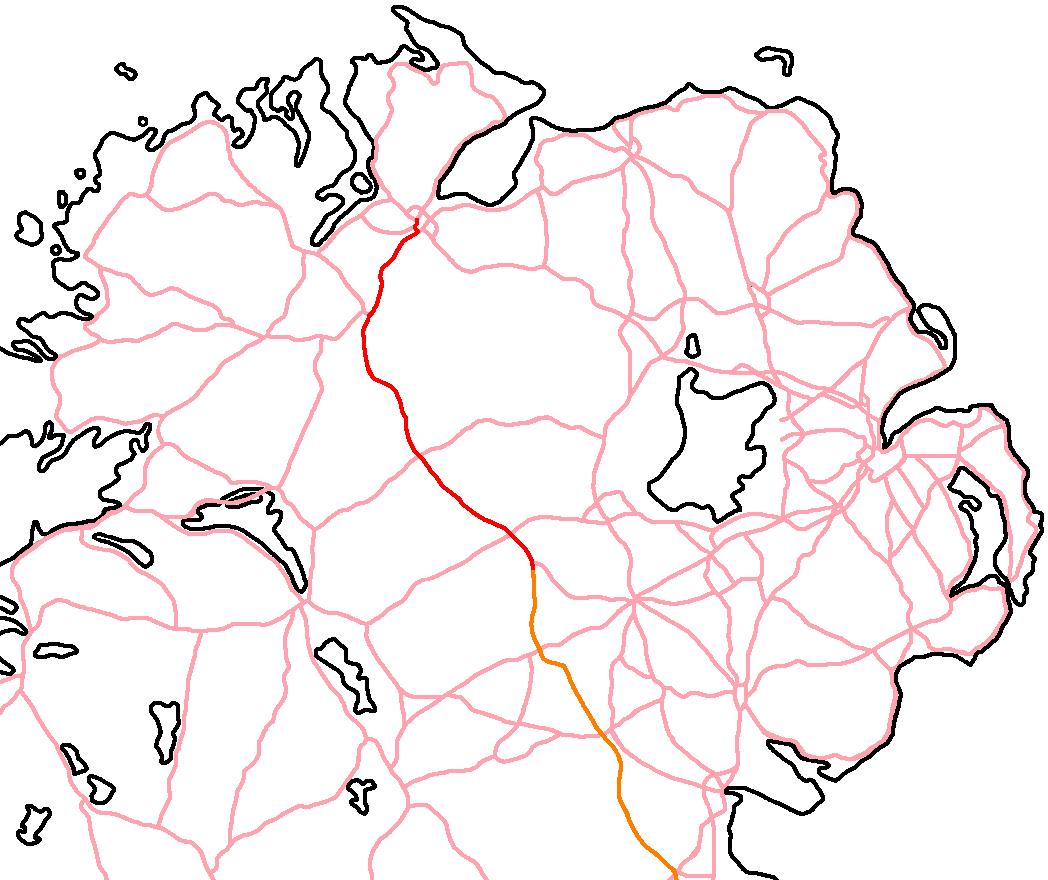
- The route of the A5 in red linking Derry city and Aughnacloy, County Tyrone). The continuation of this route in the Republic of Ireland, the N2, is shown in orange.

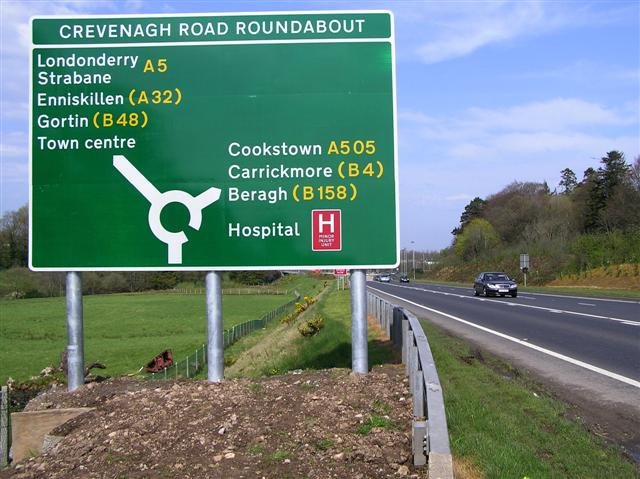
- Sign near Omagh

Route information
- Length: 53.3 mi (85.8 km)

Major junctions
- North end: Derry A2 in Derry A38 in Strabane B46 to Plumbridge A32 in Omagh A4 in Ballygawley (border) to Monaghan
- South end: Republic of Ireland–United Kingdom border, N2 road

Location
- Country: United Kingdom
- Constituent country: Northern Ireland
- Primary destinations: Derry; Strabane; Newtownstewart; Omagh; Ballygawley; Aughnacloy; Monaghan

Road network
- Roads in Northern Ireland; Motorways; A roads in Northern Ireland

The A5 is a major primary route in Northern Ireland. It links the city of Derry in the north-west of County Londonderry with Aughnacloy in the south of County Tyrone, via the towns of Strabane and Omagh. Just south of Aughnacloy is the border with County Monaghan in the Republic of Ireland, where the A5 meets the N2 to Dublin. Between them, the A5 and the N2 provide the main road link from Dublin to Derry and County Donegal.

== Route ==
The A5 starts at a crossroads in Derry where the Craigavon Bridge meets the A2. The A5 goes south skirting the River Foyle past Prehen and through the villages of Newbuildings and across the county boundary into County Tyrone at Magheramason. A dangerous bend leads up to the village of Bready, after which the road passes through Ballymagorry. It by-passes the large town of Strabane, where it meets the A38 near Lifford Bridge, which crosses the county boundary to Lifford in the east of County Donegal and onto the N15 near its junction with the N14.

After by-passing Strabane, the A5 goes through the villages of Sion Mills and Victoria Bridge. It then by-passes Newtownstewart and continues to the county town of Omagh, where it has junctions with the A32 road to Enniskillen and the A505 road to Cookstown.

The A5 continues through the hamlets of Garvaghey and Ballymackilroy to a roundabout just outside Ballygawley, where it meets the A4 Belfast – Enniskillen road. The two roads combine for a few hundred metres. The A5 continues to the village of Aughnacloy. After Aughnacloy, the road reaches the border with County Monaghan where it becomes the N2 to Dublin, which passes around both Monaghan and Ardee.

== Recent developments ==
The A5 does not contain any dual carriageway sections, and for many years the route brought traffic through a series of towns and villages which formed bottlenecks.

Since the 1980s, a bypass of Strabane has been built in two sections. The first section was completed and opened in the early 1990s, relieving outlying northern neighbourhoods and the town centre. In 2003 the bypass was extended to divert traffic from the Melmount area of Strabane. Both projects have relieved traffic in the town. A proposed third section is now "on hold" pending wider decisions on the future of the A5 (see next section).

There was also bottleneck through the village of Newtownstewart, where the A5 included a narrow section before a sharp right turn at a T-junction with the B46 to Plumbridge. This was followed by a left turn a short distance later through the southern part of the village, before meeting a dangerous right-hand bend which carried a 25 mph speed limit. A bypass of the village, using part of the route of the dismantled Londonderry and Enniskillen Railway, was completed and opened in 2003.

From the 1990s onwards an A5 bypass was also built in three stages through the town of Omagh. The first, central, stage was completed in the mid-1990s and diverted the A5 away from the town centre. In the late 1990s the second stage was completed, relieving the increasingly built-up northern parts of the town. In 2006, the final stage was opened, taking traffic away from housing developments on the southern edge of the town and diverting traffic from a bridge over the Drumragh river, the site of a dangerous S-bend and accident blackspot.

== Planned developments ==
The Department of Regional Development has confirmed that part of the A5 route at Tullyvar, between Ballygawley and Aughnacloy, will be realigned, as will the A4 at Annaghilla nearby. Advanced site clearance works began in November 2007 with construction expected in 2008.

Other schemes to improve the A5 have also been proposed by the DRD:

- Completion of the Strabane by-pass by a further realignment north of the town. Construction was expected before 2011 but was put on hold pending the larger scale upgrade now proposed (see next section).
- A new link road and crossing of the River Finn across the border near Strabane to meet the planned N14/N15 Lifford by-pass. Legal procedures to confirm this scheme were being negotiated to enable this to be built between 2008 and 2010.
- The A5 carriageway between Derry and Victoria Bridge was to be upgraded to 2+1 standard. This is now unlikely to be done as the entire route may be dualled.
- A further outer bypass of Omagh; construction timetabled for after 2015.

In June 2008 Regional Development Minister Conor Murphy announced plans for a feasibility study into creating an A6 – A5 Link Road around Derry. However, this is not a commitment on behalf of his Department.

== A5 Western Transport Corridor ==
In October 2006 senior Irish Government sources confirmed that the forthcoming National Development Plan for the years 2007 to 2013 would include plans to offer co-funding for a series of infrastructure projects in Northern Ireland. The funding was accepted and in November 2007 the Northern Ireland Department for Regional Development announced that a route selection study had begun to upgrade the entire A5 route to dual-carriageway from the N2 at the Irish border near Aughnacloy, to Derry.

Then it was decided that instead of upgrading the current road, a 58-mile (93 km) new dual carriageway would be built. The project is called the A5 Western Transport Corridor, abbreviated to A5WTC.

It was suggested that the new road would reduce journey times from Derry and Northern Donegal to Dublin by 20 minutes. In 2007 the cost was estimated at £560 million. This estimate was revised upwards to £650–850 million in November 2008, £844 in August 2009 and then reached £1.049 billion in October 2016. This will be both the longest and most expensive single road scheme ever undertaken in Northern Ireland.

The Republic of Ireland was meant to contribute €460 million of the cost. However, in May 2011 the Republic's Taoiseach Enda Kenny called for the project to "look at making savings". And in November 2011 the Republic announced that it could not make its £400 million contribution to the project. In 2024 the Irish Government confirmed funding worth €800 million (£685 million) for cross-border projects, including €600m for the A5.

=== Public inquiries and opposition ===
In 2011 a set of four public inquiries into the A5WTC was held. One was strategic, considering the proposal overall. The others were in three geographical sections: New Buildings to Sion Mills, Sion Mills to south of Omagh and south of Omagh to Aughnacloy. The first of these inquiries began in April 2011 and they continued for two months. Their report was submitted to the Minister for Regional Development in March 2012 and published in 31 July.

A campaign umbrella group called the Alternative A5 Alliance (AA5A) had been founded in 2010 to oppose the A5WTC. In September 2012 the AA5A began legal proceedings against the A5WTC. A court heard the case in February 2013. The next month the judge rejected five of the six counts of the challenge. The judge upheld the challenge on one count, that the Department had failed to comply with the EU Habitats Directive.

In April 2015 it was revealed that despite being at a standstill for eight years the A5WTC project had cost £72 million.

In August 2016 the AA5A launched a second legal case against the A5WTC, apparently seeking a judicial review. A second public inquiry began in October 2016 and continued until December. Its report is awaited.

In April 2017 the Department for Infrastructure (formerly the Department of Regional Development) launched a new consultation on its A5 Habitats Regulations Reports. In March 2025 a protest was held to highlight the high fatality rates on the road.

In June 2025, a judge ruled against the scheme, following a third case at the High Court from the AA5A, citing environmental concerns. This was overturned by the Court of Appeal in October 2026.
