= A38 road (Northern Ireland) =

Road in Northern Ireland

A38

Major junctions
- East end: Strabane
- A38 in Strabane A5 in Strabane
- West end: Over Lifford Bridge in Lifford at border with the Republic, N14, & N15.

Location
- Country: United Kingdom
- Constituent country: Northern Ireland
- Primary destinations: Strabane; Lifford; Letterkenny; Stranorlar; Donegal; Ballyshannon; Sligo

Road network
- Roads in Northern Ireland; Motorways; A roads in Northern Ireland

The A38 links Strabane, County Tyrone and the A5 through the meadows of the river Foyle and over Lifford Bridge to Lifford, the County Town of County Donegal, where it links into the N14 and the N15. The N15 continues into County Donegal to Stranorlar, Ballybofey, Donegal Town, Ballyshannon, Bundoran and then leaves County Donegal, before heading to Sligo. The N14 continues through Rossgeir and Drumbeg to Letterkenny, connecting to the N13, which makes its way to Buncrana, Inishowen and Derry.

This road also connects to the N56 which makes its way around the outskirts of Letterkenny providing many routes to access the town itself before turning north to head for Dunfanaghy and the western coast of Donegal via Creeslough and Kilmacrenan.
