= Tyler Toland =

Irish footballer (born 2001)

Personal information
- Date of birth: 8 August 2001 (age 25)
- Place of birth: St Johnston, Ireland
- Position: Midfielder

Team information
- Current team: Burnley

Youth career
- Maiden City
- Raphoe Town

Senior career*
Years	Team	Apps	(Gls)
2017–2019	Sion Swifts		
2019–2021	Manchester City	1	(0)
2020–2021	→ Glasgow City (loan)		
2021–2022	Celtic		
2022–2023	Levante	9	(0)
2023–2025	Blackburn Rovers	40	(5)
2025–2026	Durham	20	(1)
2026–	Burnley	0	(0)

International career^{‡}
2016–2017	Republic of Ireland U17	15	(1)
2017–	Republic of Ireland	29	(1)
- * Club domestic league appearances and goals as of 21 July 2026 ‡ National team caps and goals as of 18 October 2026

Tyler Toland (born 8 August 2001) is an Irish professional footballer who plays as a midfielder for WSL 2 club Burnley. She previously played for Spanish club Levante UD, Scottish clubs Glasgow City and Celtic, English clubs Manchester City, Blackburn Rovers and Durham and Tyrone side Sion Swifts.

Toland made her debut for the Republic of Ireland women's national team in 2017, but wasn't selected since November 2019 after falling into dispute with the coach Vera Pauw. In September 2023, she came back to the team.

== Club career ==
=== Early years ===
Tyler Toland was born on 8 August 2001 and was raised in St Johnston, a village in the Laggan district in the east of County Donegal in Ulster, the northern province in Ireland. She is the daughter of former Finn Harps player Maurice Toland. She started playing football for Maiden City F.C. while attending Deele College in Raphoe. In 2016, she was voted as Irish under-16 player of the year. She participated in the Galway Cup for Kildrum Tigers in 2017. Despite being the only girl in the tournament, she was on the winning team that defeated Glentoran F.C. in the final. Owing to her home club of Maiden City playing in future tournaments that did not allow for girls to participate, Toland signed to play for Northern Irish club Sion Swifts. In her first season, Toland won the IFA Women's Challenge Cup playing in the final for Sion Swifts against Newry City Ladies at Windsor Park, Belfast.

=== Manchester City ===
On 9 August 2019, Toland signed with English FA WSL team Manchester City. She made four appearances for Man City in the 2019–20 season, before being disrupted by an ankle ligament injury in August 2020. In October 2020 Toland accepted an offer to move on loan to Scottish champions Glasgow City.

=== Celtic ===
Toland signed for Celtic in July 2021, following her release from Manchester City. In the 2021–22 season, Celtic won both the Scottish Women's Premier League Cup and Scottish Women's Cup, but Toland was not a regular first team pick and left the club after the expiry of her one-year contract.

=== Levante ===
Days after her departure from Celtic, Spanish Primera División club Levante announced the signing of Toland to a two-year contract. After a year in which she didn't played a lot of games, Toland left Levante in a mutual agreement.

=== Blackburn Rovers ===
In 2023, she would join Blackburn Rovers. She departed the club after the conclusion of the 2024/25 season after Blackburn had withdrawn from the Women's Championship, because the club owner was unwilling to meet the league's requirements on facilities, player welfare and staffing.

=== Durham ===
In July 2025, Toland signed for Durham on a permanent transfer. She departed the club after the end of the 2025/26 season after making 23 games.

=== Burnley ===
Toland joined newly promoted Women's Super League 2 side Burnley joining fellow Irish Naoisha McAloon, Jamie Finn and Kiera Sena.

== International career ==
=== Youth ===
In 2014, Toland was selected to play for Republic of Ireland Schools. In 2016, she played for the Republic of Ireland U-15s, U-16s and U-17s.

=== Senior ===
In 2017, Toland was called up to the Republic of Ireland's senior team for the 2019 FIFA World Cup qualifiers. She made her senior international debut for the Republic of Ireland in September 2017 coming on as a substitute against Northern Ireland at Mourneview Park. In doing so Toland reportedly became the Republic of Ireland's youngest senior player on record, surpassing goalkeeper Emma Byrne. (Note: A list maintained by RSSSF suggests at least two other players, Denise Lyons and Grainne Cross, played for Ireland while younger than Toland.) Toland made her first senior start for the Republic of Ireland a month later in October against the Slovakia women's national football team.

Incoming national team coach Vera Pauw selected Toland in her first two squads, for UEFA Women's Euro 2022 qualifiers against Ukraine and Greece. She remained an unused substitute in both matches and was then dropped from the national team squad after falling into dispute with Pauw. The dispute escalated in May 2021 when Pauw publicly accused Toland's father of "harassment and intimidation", which he said was laughable. Pauw said that Toland's 18-month exile from the national team could end if Toland telephoned to apologise for the perceived misconduct, instead of sending text messages, suggesting "maybe a bit of guts would help her".

In September 2021 the dispute remained unresolved, though Pauw said that Toland's recent lack of first team football at Celtic meant that she would not be considered for the national team in any case. After Pauw was removed from her position in 2023, Toland was brought back into the squad by Eileen Gleeson.

=== International goals ===
No.	Date	Venue	Opponent	Score	Result	Competition
1.	3 September 2019	Tallaght Stadium, Dublin, Ireland	Montenegro	1–0	2–0	UEFA Women's Euro 2022 qualifying

== Honours ==
Sion Swifts

- IFA Women's Challenge Cup: 2017

Celtic

- SWPL League Cup: 2022
- Scottish Women's Cup: 2022
