= Droim Caoin =

Droim Caoin is the Irish name for two villages:

- Drumkeen, County Donegal, Ireland
- Drumquin, County Tyrone, Northern Ireland
