= Strabane and Letterkenny Railway =

Irish transport asset

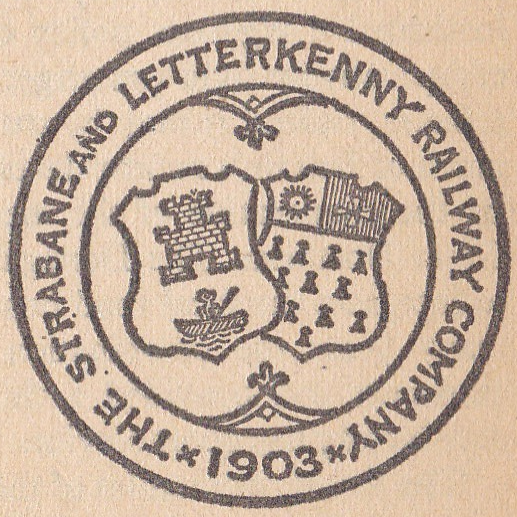
- Illustrated seal of the Strabane and Letterkenny Railway.

Overview
- Operator: County Donegal Railways Joint Committee
- Stations called at: 9
- Headquarters: Strabane
- Key people: Henry Forbes, Bernard L. Curran
- Dates of operation: 1 May 1906–31 December 1959
- Successor: CIÉ

Technical
- Track gauge: 3 ft (914 mm)
- Length: 19 1/4 miles (31.0 km)

The Strabane and Letterkenny Railway was a 3 ft (914 mm) narrow gauge railway line between Strabane, County Tyrone and Letterkenny, County Donegal in Ireland.

== History ==
Strabane and Letterkenny Railway (SLR) opened for public service on 1 January 1909 with a route length of 19 1/4 miles (31.0 km). It was the last narrow-gauge railway constructed in Ireland (excluding mineral lines). Much of the company was owned by the County Donegal Railways Joint Committee (CDRJC), and as it was also worked by them, it effectively formed part of that railway.

The CDRJC pioneered the use of diesel operated railcars, but despite this innovation, closure came at the end of 1959, and the railway was shut to passengers on 31 December 1959.

The line was used heavily by freight traffic between the market town of Letterkenny and Strabane. Special freight services continued into 1960 until the line was lifted.

After closure, the CDRJC continued to exist to provide substitute road services. On 12 July 1971, CDRJC was vested in CIÉ and SLR was dissolved. At the point of dissolution, 87% of SLR's shares were owned by CDRJC. The remaining shareholders received a total of £14,500 in compensation.

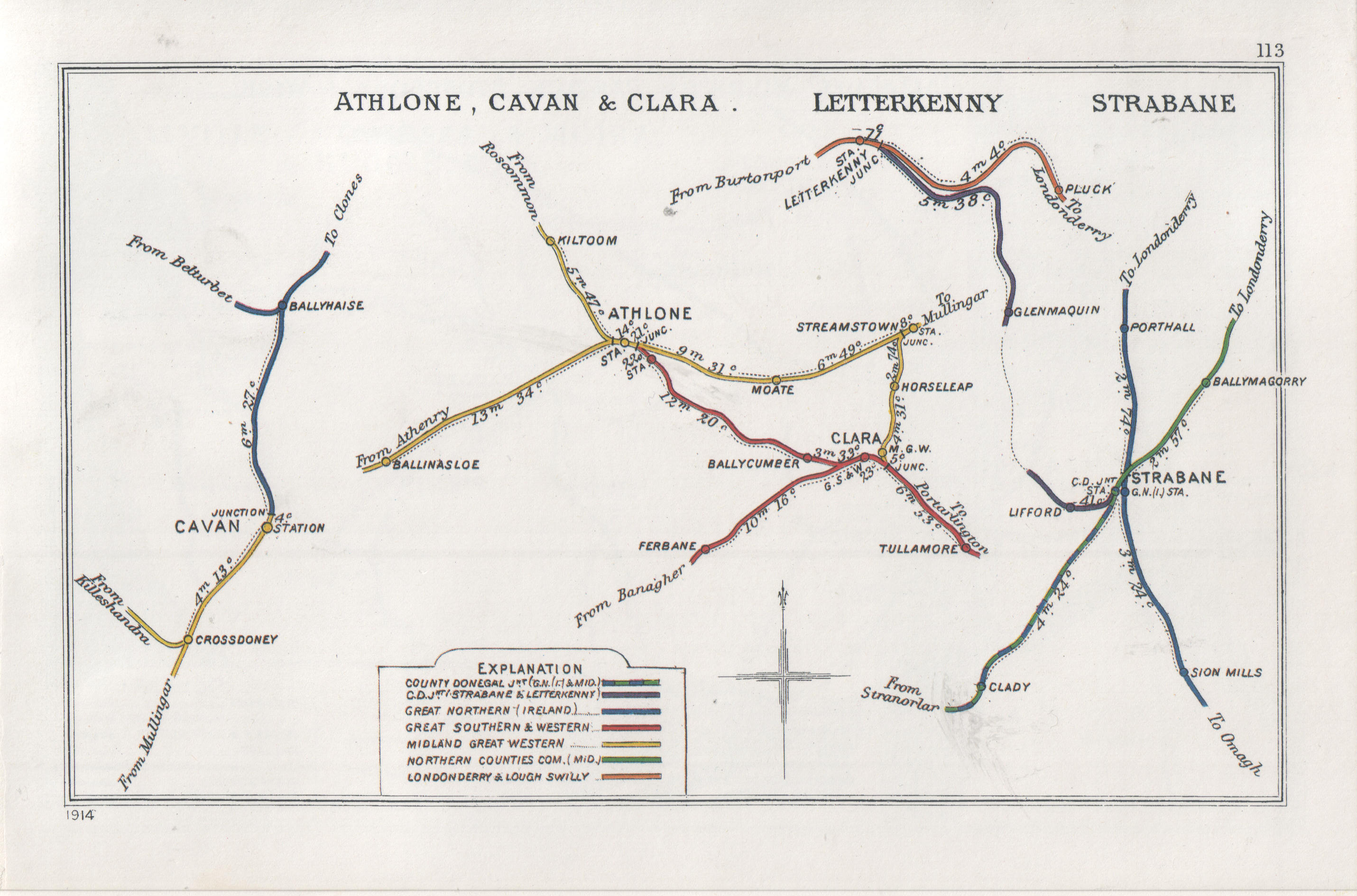
Railway Clearing House map with stations in Strabane and Letterkenny

== Stations ==
All stations were opened on 1 January 1909 and closed on 1 January 1960 unless stated.

Distance in miles (km)	Station	Notes	Coordinates
0.0 miles (0 km)	Strabane	Opened 16 July 1894.	54.830478°N 7.470319°W
1.0 mile (1.6 km)	Lifford halt		54.83631°N 7.47886°W
2.75 miles (4.43 km)	Ballindrait		54.847034°N 7.519409°W
4.75 miles (7.64 km)	Coolaghy halt	Opened 1911.	
6.5 miles (10.5 km)	Raphoe		54.870552°N 7.600758°W
9.0 miles (14.5 km)	Convoy		
11.0 miles (17.7 km)	Cornagillagh halt		
13.75 miles (22.13 km)	Glenmaquin		
19.25 miles (30.98 km)	Letterkenny	Connection with Letterkenny (LLSR).	54.953697°N 7.728593°W

== See also ==
- List of narrow-gauge railways in Ireland
