= Burn Dale =

Small river in County Donegal, Ireland

Coordinates: 54°50′55″N 7°28′13″W

- Etymology: Irish: An Daoil, meaning 'the Black One'
- Native name: An Daoil (Irish)

Location
- Country: Ireland
- Province: Ulster
- County: County Donegal
- Baronies: Raphoe South and Raphoe North
- Traditional districts: The burn flows through the Finn Valley and The Laggan, two traditional 'districts' in East Donegal

Physical characteristics
- Source
  - location: Near Lough Dale, just below Cark Mountain, in East Donegal
- Mouth
  - location: The Burn Dale enters the River Foyle directly opposite the Islandmore, just north-north-east of Lifford
- Length: Almost 20 miles (almost 32 kilometres) long

Basin features
- River system: Foyle System

The Burn Dale (Irish: An Daoil, meaning 'the Black One') is a burn or small river in the east of County Donegal in Ulster, the northern province in Ireland. The burn is also known in English as the Dale Burn, the Burn Deele, the Burndale River, the Deele River or the River Deele. In the Ulster Scots dialect, a 'burn' is a stream or small river.

== Course ==
The Burn Dale rises in, and flows through, East Donegal. It rises near Lough Dale, also known as Lough Deele, a lough just below Cark Mountain, very near the village and townland of Drumkeen. The burn flows to the east-south-east from its source, mainly flowing in an east-south-easterly direction for its entire course. It flows around the southern edges of both Drumkeen and Convoy, flowing about two miles to the south of Raphoe, and then flows through the village of Ballindrait. The burn flows through two baronies: Raphoe South and Raphoe North. Some stretches of the burn form the boundary between the Finn Valley and The Laggan, two traditional 'districts' in East Donegal.

The mouth of the Burn Dale is where the townland of Coolatee 'marches up against' (borders or meets) the townland of Wood Island, on the northern outskirts of Lifford. It empties into the River Foyle directly opposite the Islandmore, a townland and part of an island that is just under a mile east from Mulrine's Bridge, entering a channel of the Foyle about a mile north-north-east of Lifford Bridge. The Burn Dale is almost 20 miles (almost 32 kilometres) long.

The N13 crosses the Burn Dale just outside Drumkeen, while the N14 crosses the Burn Dale at Mulrine's Bridge, near the Rossgeir Junction, just to the north of Lifford. The stretch of the R236 known locally as 'the Braaid Rayid' or 'the Braaid Roád', both Ulster-Scots terms meaning 'the Broad Road', crosses the Burn Dale at Glasly Bridge, just to the west-south-west of Convoy. The R264 crosses the Burn Dale in Ballindrait.
