= Convoy, County Donegal =

Village in County Donegal, Ireland

Convoy Conmhaigh
- Village
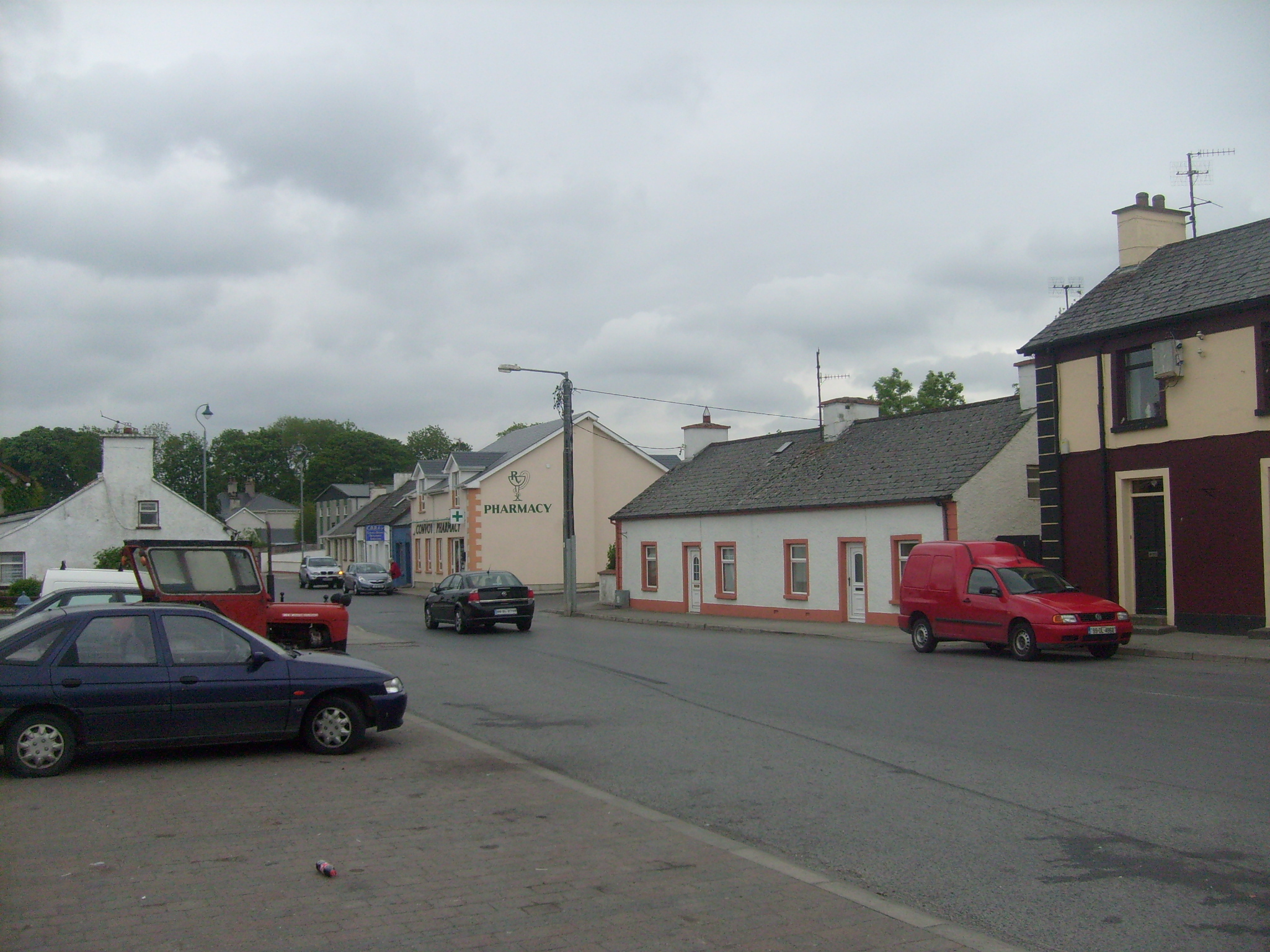
- Convoy's main street

- Location in Ireland
- Coordinates: 54.859998°N 7.663976°W
- Country: Ireland
- Province: Ulster
- County: County Donegal
- Barony: Raphoe South
- Dáil Éireann: Donegal
- Elevation: 40 m (130 ft)

Population (2022)
  - Total: 1,702
- Irish Grid Reference: C216014

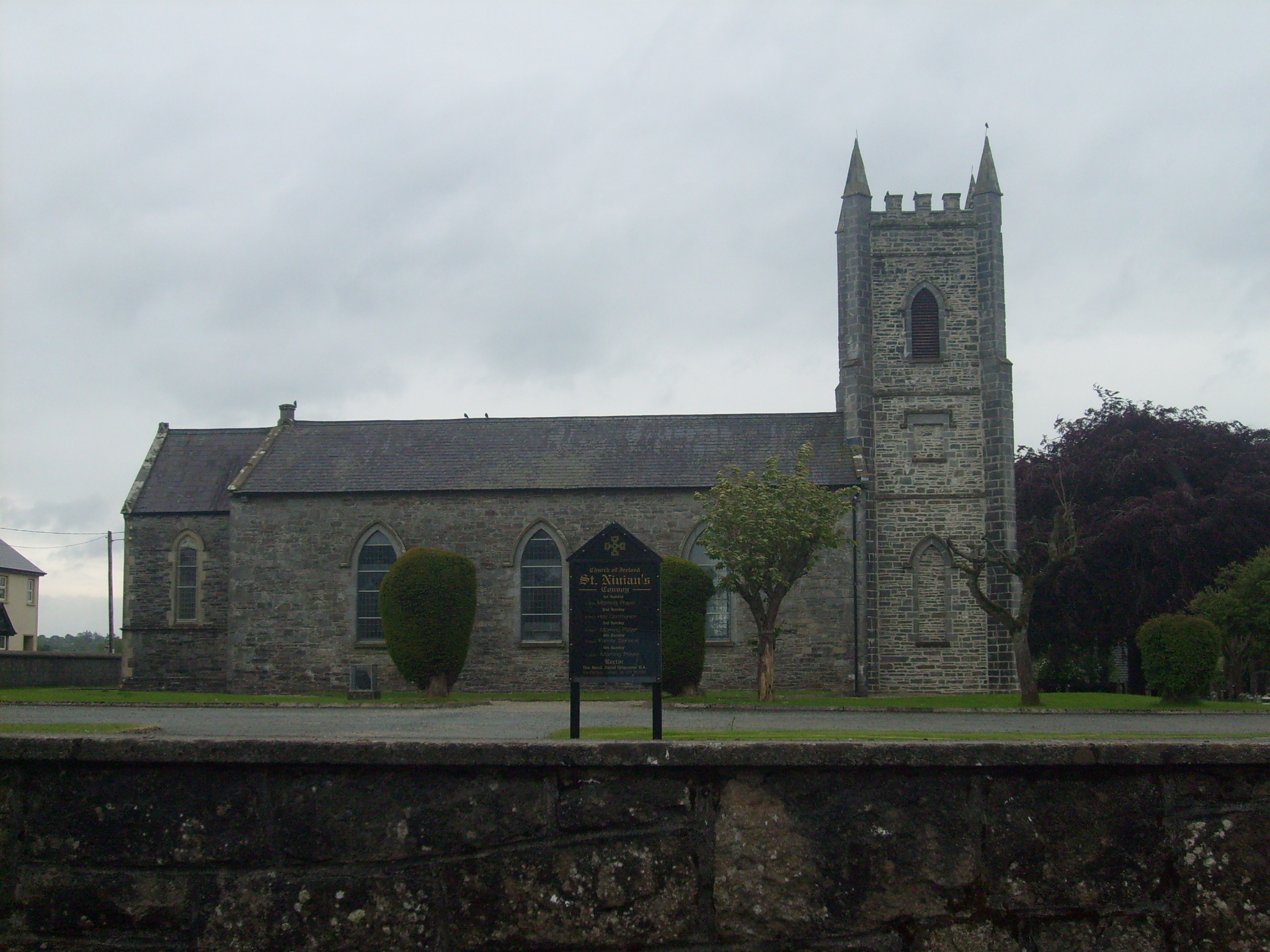
St. Ninian's Church of Ireland Church

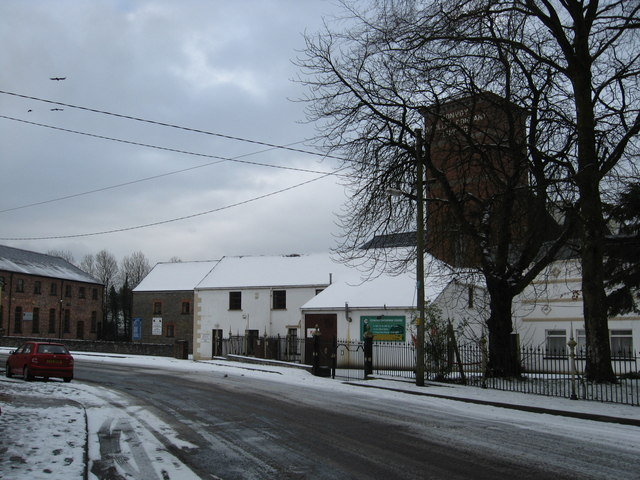
The old Convoy Woollen Mill

Convoy (Irish: Conmhaigh, "plain of hounds") is a village and civil parish in the east of County Donegal, Ireland. The village is located in the Finn Valley district and is part of the Barony of Raphoe South. It is situated on the Burn Dale (also known as the Burn Deele), and is located on the R236 road to Raphoe.

Convoy had a total population of 1,702 according to the 2022 census. Like many other towns in the vicinity, it has its origins in the Plantation of Ulster. Convoy is home to a mixed religious community which is reflected in the schools and churches in the town.

There is a Catholic and a mixed primary school in the town. There is also a Catholic church (popularly known as 'the Chapel'), a Church of Ireland church, a Presbyterian Church, a Reformed Presbyterian Church and a Free Presbyterian Church (which was opened by the Church's founder, The Rev. Ian Paisley) in the town. There are no secondary schools in Convoy and local children tend to travel to Raphoe or Stranorlar for second-level education.

The Burn Dale (also known in English as the Burn Deele) is a burn (a small river) that flows along the southern edge of Convoy.

== Woollen mill ==
Convoy once had a woollen mill located on the banks of the Burn Dale (also spelt as the Burn Deele), but this closed in the early 1980s with the loss of many local jobs. The woollen mill is now host to a business area that was promoted by the former state development body FÁS.

== Convoy House ==
The Montgomery family of Convoy is descended from Alexander Montgomery, Prebendary of Doe, who died about 1658. He was brought over from Scotland by his kinsman, George Montgomery, who became the first Protestant Bishop of Raphoe in 1604. Alexander Montgomery of Croaghan, near Lifford, bought the Convoy estate from the Nesbitt family in 1719. Boyton House was first occupied in November 1807 by the family of Robert Montgomery of Brandrim who had inherited the estate from his cousin, Sandy Montgomery of Convoy. Sandy represented Donegal in Grattan's Parliament for thirty-two years. He spent part of his youth in America and was noted for his duelling. His brothers were John of Lisbon and Richard, a general in Washington's army who fell at the siege of Quebec in 1775. Sandy was a friend of Lord Edward Fitzgerald and a secret supporter of the United Irishmen. He voted against the Act of Union in 1800. Boyton House used to contain the letter which Washington wrote to the family on Richard's death and receipts for meat bought by the hundred-weight in Raphoe by the Montgomery family for free distribution in Convoy during the Famine. The house passed through marriage to the Boyton family in the nineteenth century.

== Transport ==
There are Bus Éireann buses serving Convoy which go to such places as Derry, Letterkenny and Strabane several times a day, excluding Sundays.

Convoy railway station opened on 1 January 1909, and closed on 1 January 1960.

The nearest railway station is operated by NI Railways and runs from Waterside Station in Derry, via Coleraine, to Belfast Lanyon Place railway station and Belfast Grand Central station.

== Sport ==
Convoy near Donegal GAA's "centre of excellence" training facility at Milltown.

Naomh Mhuire Conmhaigh is the local GAA club. Founded in 1928 the players of this Gaelic football club come from the villages of Convoy, Drumkeen and Raphoe with the pitch located in Convoy. The club has won several junior titles.

Convoy has a local amateur soccer team, known as Convoy Arsenal. The club were Donegal Junior League winners in 2003, won the Division One title in 2004, and were runners-up in the premier division in 2005. Convoy Arsenal subsequently joined the Ulster Senior League in 2005. They also field teams in the Donegal Saturday League in several underage grades.

== See also ==
- List of populated places in the Republic of Ireland
