= Gerald Francis Yeo =

Irish physiologist and academic

Gerald Francis Yeo (19 January 1845 – 1 May 1909) was an Irish physiologist and academic.

== Life ==
Born in Dublin on 19 January 1845, he was second son of Henry Yeo of Tansey, Ceanchor Road, Howth, J.P., clerk of the rules, court of exchequer, by his wife Jane, daughter of Captain Ferns. Yeo was educated at the Royal School Dungannon, and at Trinity College Dublin, where he graduated moderator in natural science in 1866, proceeding M.B. and M.Ch. in 1867. In 1868 he gained the gold medal of the Dublin Pathological Society for an essay on renal disease. After studying abroad for three years, a year each in Paris, Berlin, and Vienna, he proceeded M.D. at Dublin in 1871, and became next year M.R.C.P. and M.R.C.S. Ireland.

For two years Yeo taught physiology in the Carmichael school of medicine in Dublin. He was appointed professor of physiology in King's College London, in 1875, and in 1877 assistant surgeon to King's College Hospital, becoming F.R.C.S.England in 1878. He delivered for the College of Surgeons the Arris and Gale lectures on anatomy and physiology in 1880–2. With Hugo Kronecker, Yeo inaugurated the triennial international physiological congresses; the first met at Basel in 1889, and was organised by Yeo with Michael Foster.

Yeo was elected Fellow of the Royal Society in 1889. He resigned his chair of physiology at King's College in 1890 and received the title of emeritus professor. He then retired to Totnes in Devon, and later to Fowey, where he devoted himself to yachting, fishing, and gardening. He died at Austin's Close, Harbertonford, Devon, on 1 May 1909.

== Works ==
Yeo worked with David Ferrier, a fellow professor of neuro-pathology at King's College, on cerebral localisation in monkeys. They exhibited a hemiplegic monkey at the first International Physiological Congress. This work proceeded against a background of antivivisection activism. Yeo was known from 1875 as the first secretary of The Physiological Society, originally a dining club, but with a purpose of thwarting antivivisection campaigners; he resigned in 1889. Ferrier did not have a license under the Cruelty to Animals Act 1876 to perform animal experiments, and Yeo did the practical work. Ferrier was taken to court under the Act in 1881, but was acquitted, having testified that he only witnessed procedures carried out by Yeo.

Yeo's Manual of Physiology for the Use of Students of Medicine (1884; 6th edit. 1894) was a text-book. He contributed scientific papers to the Proceedings and Transactions of the Royal Society and to the Journal of Physiology.

== Family ==
Yeo married (1) in 1873 Charlotte, only daughter of Isaac Kitchin of Rockferry, Cheshire (she died without issue in 1884); (2) in 1886 Augusta Frances, second daughter of Edward Hunt of Thomastown, co. Kilkenny, by whom he had one son.

== Notes ==
Attribution

This article incorporates text from a publication now in the public domain: Lee, Sidney, ed. (1912). "Yeo, Gerald Francis". Dictionary of National Biography (2nd supplement). Vol. 3. London: Smith, Elder & Co.
