= Waller Hobson =

Irish Anglican priest, Archdeacon of Armagh

Edward Waller Hobson (5 December 1851 – 17 April 1924) was an Irish Anglican clergyman. He also played rugby union for Ireland.

Hobson was educated at the Royal School Dungannon and Trinity College, Oxford, where he graduated with a Master of Arts; and ordained in 1877 After a curacy in Kingstown he held incumbencies at Moy, Derryloran and Portadown. He also held chaplaincy roles to the Lord Lieutenant of Ireland and the Lord Primate of All Ireland. He became Archdeacon of Armagh in 1915, a post he held until his death. At the same time as his appointment as archdeacon, he was appointed the librarian to the Armagh Public Library.

== Personal life ==
Hobson was the son of Canon John Meade Hobson.

On 11 June 1891 Hobson married Frances Maria Hall-Dare, daughter of Robert Westley Hall-Dare and Frances Anne Catharine Lambart. They had no children.
