= Bridgend, County Donegal =

Village in County Donegal, Ireland

Bridgend Ceann an Droichid
- Village
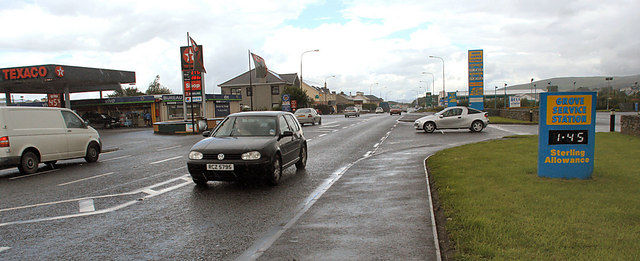
- Bridgend, on the N13 road

- Location in Ireland
- Coordinates: 55°02′30″N 7°22′48″W
- Country: Ireland
- Province: Ulster
- County: County Donegal

Government
  - Dáil Éireann: Donegal

Population (2022)
  - Total: 373
- Time zone: UTC+0 (WET)
  - Summer (DST): UTC-1 (IST (WEST))
- Irish Grid Reference: C396217

Bridgend or Bridge End (Irish: Ceann an Droichid) is a village in County Donegal, Ireland, at the base of the Inishowen peninsula. It is located on the N13 road to Letterkenny, on the western outskirts of Derry and near the border between the Republic of Ireland and Northern Ireland.

== History ==
Bridgend was one of several Protestant villages in eastern Donegal that would have been transferred to Northern Ireland, had the recommendations of the Irish Boundary Commission been enacted in 1925.

== Schools ==
The national school or primary school in Bridgend is called St. Aengus' National School. Traditionally, children resident in Bridgend attend secondary schools in Buncrana - Scoil Mhuire (Convent of Mercy) and Crana College (formerly Buncrana Vocational School or more commonly known as the 'tech').

== Parish and townlands ==
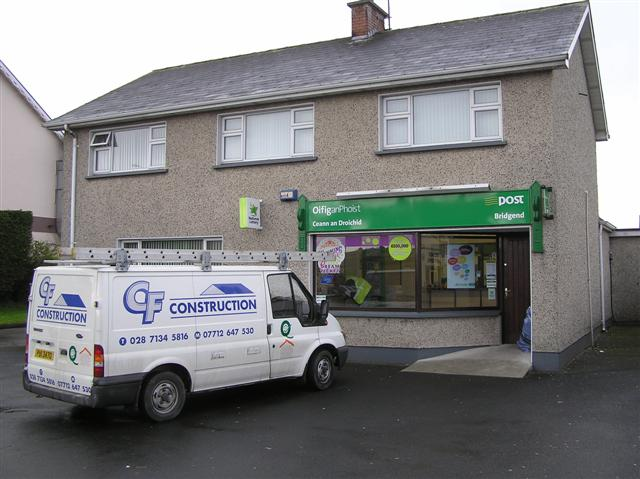
An Post post office in Bridge End

Bridgend is part of Fahan parish which takes in Fahan, Burt and Inch.

The main townlands of Bridgend include Carrowreagh and Bunamayne (or Bonemaine; Irish: Bun na Maighne). They are divided by a river which runs through Bridgend, with Carrowreagh to the north and Bunamayne to the south of the river. Other townlands of Bridgend include Tummock which is a back road running parallel to the Burt main road.

== Sport ==
Traditionally, children of St. Aengus' N.S. have gone on to play for the local GAA club which is Burt GAC. They have also continued to play for the Club long after they progress to secondary and third level education. The footballer Oisín Gallen teaches at St Aengus’ National School.

== See also ==
- List of populated places in Ireland
