= Royal School Cavan =

Location
- College Street; Cavan, County Cavan; Ireland

Information
- Religious affiliation: Church of Ireland
- Established: 1608; 418 years ago, current building and location: 1819; 207 years ago
- Founder: James I
- Chairperson: Bishop of Kilmore Ferran Glenfield
- Principal: Padraic Corley
- Staff: 50
- Gender: Mixed
- Enrolment: 240
- Colours: Green and Red
- Website: http://www.royalschoolcavan.ie/

The Royal School Cavan is a secondary school located in Cavan, County Cavan, Ireland. It was one of a number of 'free schools' created by James I in 1608 to provide an education to the sons of local merchants and farmers during the plantation of Ulster. It has four 'sister' schools: The Royal School, Armagh in Armagh, The Enniskillen Royal Grammar School in Enniskillen, County Fermanagh, The Royal and Prior School Raphoe in County Donegal, and The Royal School Dungannon in Dungannon, County Tyrone.

== History ==
The Royal School Cavan was one of the five schools originally established as part of a plan to provide education for children of the settlers who had arrived with the Ulster Plantation. Although the school traces its origins to 1608, it experienced substantial challenges in its first three centuries of operation and was threatened with closure. However, with the appointment of John Anderson as headmaster in 1924, and subsequently his son Douglas Anderson (1970-1989), then Ivan Bolton (1989-2009) and Edward Lindsay (2009-2020) the school has steadily improved with new facilities and a steady increase in enrolment.

A few months prior to the reopening of schools following the COVID-19 lockdown it was confirmed that the school would be suspending its boarding policy indefinitely due to high cost and difficulty in maintaining social distancing measures, the first time this has happened in its over 400-year history.

In April 2022, it was announced that the Royal School would drop fees for the first time in its history given the lack of available funding from the department of education for fee paying schools.

== Notable alumni and staff ==
- Thomas Sheridan - headmaster (1735-1738)
- Henry Brooke - student, later a novelist and dramatist
- Edward Nangle - student, later Church of Ireland minister
- Sir Thomas Fowell Buxton - student, later 1st Baronet Buxton of Belfield and Ruxton
- Robert Daly - student, later Bishop of Cashel and Waterford
- Captain William Gardiner McConnell, R.A.M.C. (1891-1917) - student, later fought and was fatally wounded in battle during the First World War
- Patrick J. Lindsay TD - teacher of classics in the late 1930s, later a Teachta Dála for Mayo North, and Minister for the Gaeltacht
