= Royal High School =

Royal High School may refer to:

== United Kingdom ==
- Royal High School, Edinburgh, Scotland
- Royal High School, Bath, England

== United States ==
- Royal High School (California), Simi Valley, California
- Royal High School (Texas), Brookshire, Texas
- Royal High School (Washington), Royal City, Washington
- Royal Valley High School, Hoyt, Kansas
- Royal Palm Beach High School, Royal Palm Beach, Florida

== See also ==
- Royal School (disambiguation)
- Royal Grammar School (disambiguation)
