= Oakfield Demesne =

House and grounds with heritage railway, County Donegal, Ireland

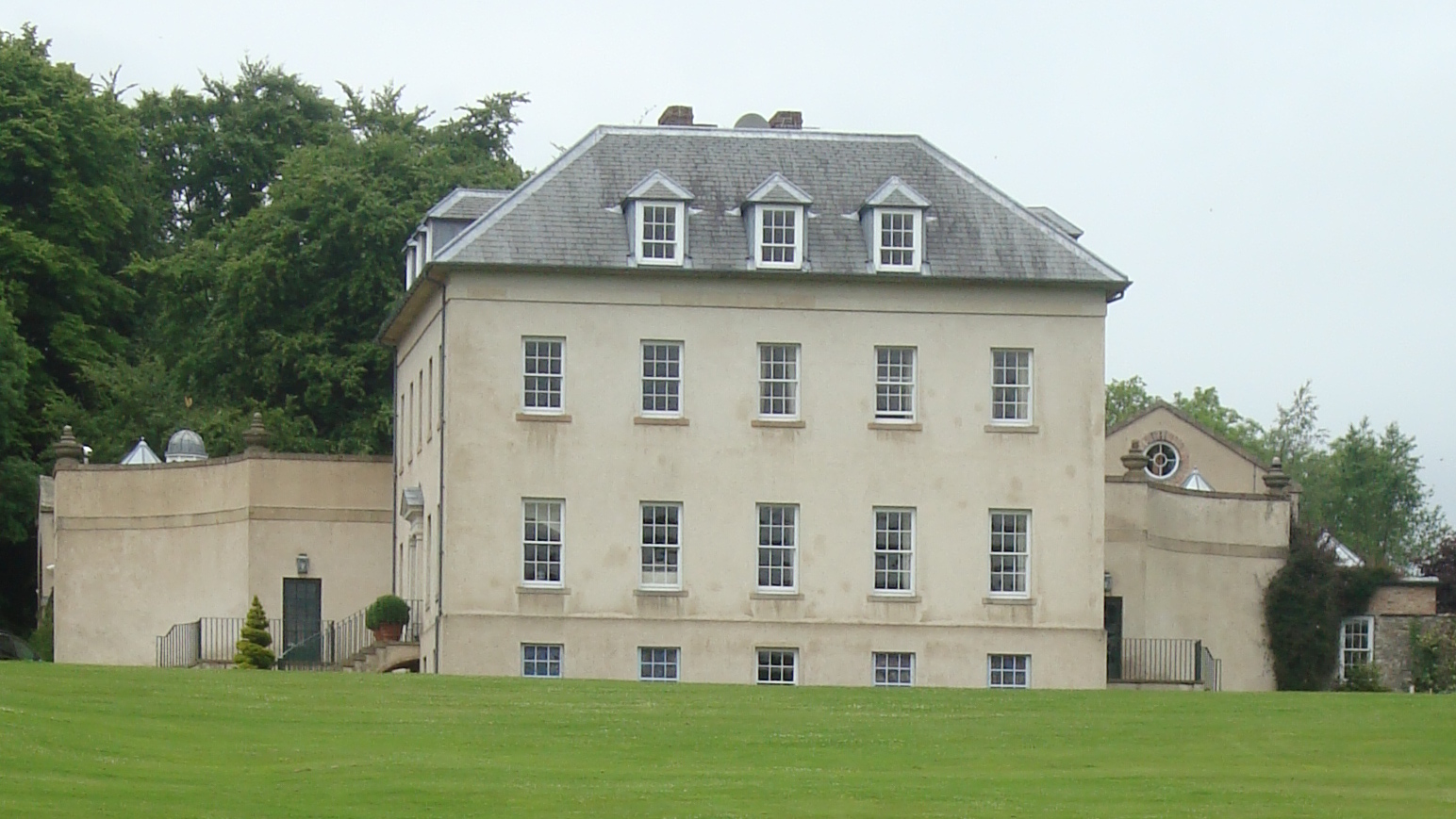
- Oakfield House
- Interactive map of Oakfield Demesne
- Coordinates: 54.8765°N 7.5745°W
- Website: oakfieldpark.com

Oakfield Demesne is a house, grounds and townland in County Donegal, Ireland, originally built in 1739 for the Dean of Raphoe. Since 1996 it has been owned by Sir Gerry Robinson (who died in 2021) and his wife, Lady Heather Robinson. The demesne includes the 100-acre Oakfield Park gardens, open to the public which includes the 4 kilometres (2.5 mi) narrow-gauge railway Difflin Lake Railway.

== History ==
The house that is central to the estate was originally built by the Church of Ireland for the Deanery of Raphoe in 1739. It ceased to be used as a deanery after being sold to Captain Thomas Butler Stoney of the Donegal Militia in 1869.

Former occupants included Captain Stoney. The Irish Republican Army were known to have occupied the house in the 1920s. The Patterson family, known for their music, were owners during the twentieth century.

After purchasing the estate the Robinsons engaged the architect Tony Wright to transform the 100 acres (0.40 km^{2}) overgrown estate into parklands, gardens and lakes to restore the house to its original condition.

== Oakfield House ==
The house was built c. 1739 as a five-bay, two-storey with a dormer constructed over a basement.

== Oakfield Park ==
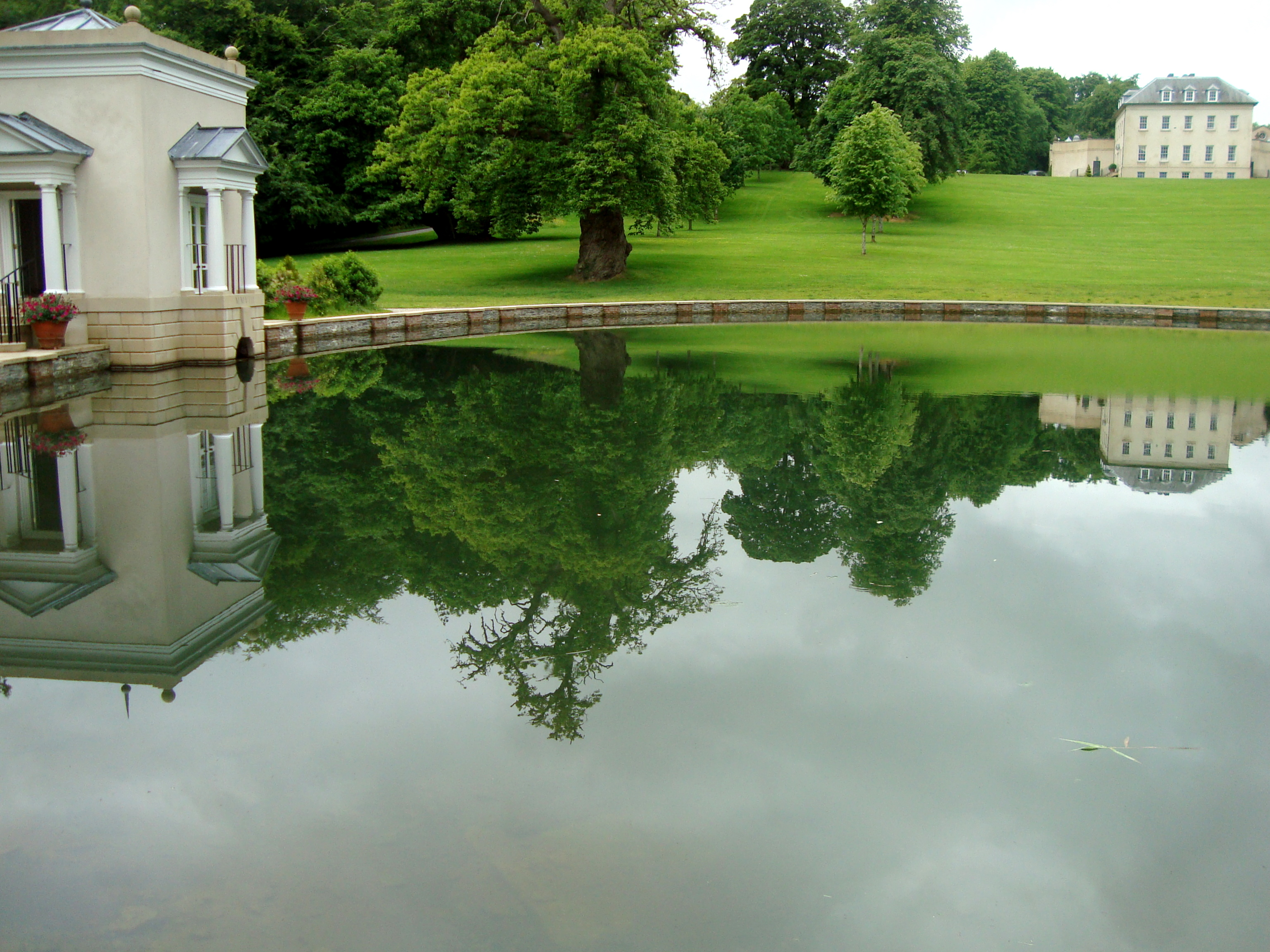
Nymphaeum at Oakfield Demesne

The park was created by the Robinsons soon after the start of their stewardship; as an extension of the existing gardens which had become mainly disused. Some old trees did remain, including a 12-limbed horse Chestnut and a Spanish chestnut, calculated to be as old as the Battle of the Boyne.

To cater for the 2021 season in the COVID-19 pandemic additional outdoor covered seating has been provided for alfresco diners.

== Difflin Lake Railway ==
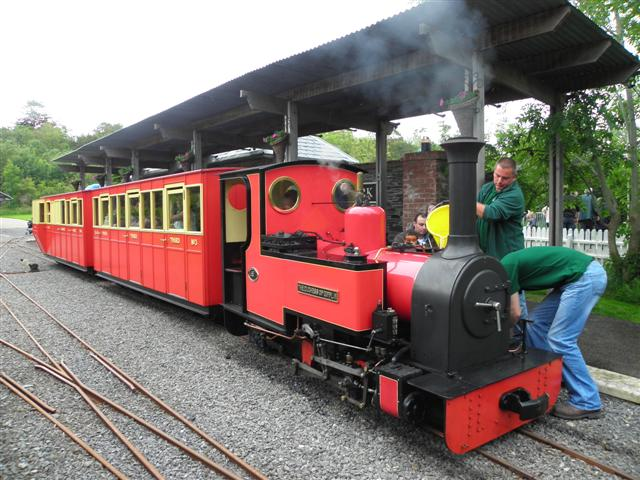
Oakfield Park station

The Difflin Lake Railway is 4.5 kilometres (2.8 mi) is length. As of July 2021 it is one of seven operational heritage railways in the Republic of Ireland that the Commission for Rail Regulation requires to have a Safety Management System (SMS) in place.
