= Royal Grammar School =

Royal Grammar School may refer to the following schools in England:

- Clitheroe Royal Grammar School, Lancashire
- Colchester Royal Grammar School, Essex
- Lancaster Royal Grammar School, Lancashire
- Royal Grammar School, Guildford, Surrey
- Royal Grammar School, High Wycombe, Buckinghamshire
- Royal Grammar School, Newcastle upon Tyne, North East England
- Royal Grammar School Worcester, previously "RGS Worcester and The Alice Ottley School", Worcestershire
  - RGS Dodderhill, an affiliated school

== See also ==
- Royal High School (disambiguation)
- Royal School (disambiguation)
