= N13 road (Ireland) =

Road in Ireland

N13 road
- Bóthar N13

Route information
- Length: 43.76 km (27.19 mi)

Location
- Country: Ireland
- Primary destinations: (bypassed routes in italics): County Donegal; (N15 from Sligo); Stranorlar; (N56 from Letterkenny); (N14 to Lifford); Manorcunningham; Newtowncunningham; Bridgend; (A2 into Derry)

Highway system
- Roads in Ireland; Motorways; Primary; Secondary; Regional

The N13 road is a national primary road in Ireland, running in County Donegal in Ulster from Stranorlar to just outside Derry. This road connects Letterkenny to Sligo, Derry and onwards to other destinations.

== Route ==
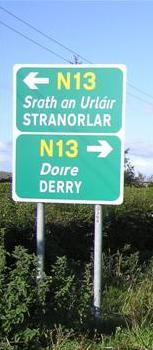
N13 road sign

The route diverges from the N15 (from Sligo) at Stranorlar. The route north through Kilross includes a T Junction with the R236 and then runs, via the townland of Drumnacross, over the Burn Dale (a burn or small river, also known as the Burn Deele) just outside the village of Drumkeen and on to the Dry Arch Bridge, located east of Letterkenny with a roundabout. The N56 runs along the Port Road to Letterkenny town centre. A section of dual carriageway runs east to bring the N13 (and traffic from the N14) to Corkey, where the N14 begins, and heads southeastwards linking Lifford from the roundabout with the N13. The N13 continues near Lough Swilly passing Manorcunningham northeast as single carriageway, passing along a bypass of Newtowncunningham and passing through Speenoge. The route turns east (with the R239 linking Buncrana) southeast at Bridgend to end at the border with Northern Ireland becoming the A2 road northwest of Derry and linking the city centre, and over Craigavon Bridge to Waterside Railway Station in the Waterside.

As originally designated, the N13 continued along the present N56 into Letterkenny, the section from Stranorlar to Letterkenny being part of the N56.

== Upgrades ==
As of 2006 no upgrades of the N13 were planned. The majority of the route is demarcated by the National Roads Authority as "upgraded" on their National Roads 2006 Status map.

== See also ==
- Roads in Ireland
- Motorways in Ireland
- National secondary road
- Regional road
