= Royal School Dungannon =

Coordinates: 54.503°N 6.763°W

Location
- 2 Ranfurly Road; Dungannon, County Tyrone, BT71 6EG; Northern Ireland

Information
- Type: Boarding Grammar School
- Motto: Latin: Perseverando (by persevering)
- Established: 1614; 412 years ago
- Founder: James I
- Local authority: Education Authority
- Headmaster: David Burnett
- Staff: 50
- Gender: Mixed
- Age: 11 to 18
- Enrolment: 650 (10,000 alumni)
- Houses: Beresford Charlemont; Bullingbrook Tyrone; Mountjoy Ranfurly; Nicholson Dungannon
- Colours: Chocolate and Magenta
- Former pupils: RSD Alumni
- Website: www.royaldungannon.com

The Royal School is a co-educational boarding school located in Dungannon, County Tyrone, Northern Ireland. It was one of a number of 'free schools' created by James I (otherwise known as James VI of Scotland) in 1608 to provide an education to the sons of local merchants and farmers during the plantation of Ulster. Originally set up in Mountjoy near Lough Neagh in 1614, it moved to its present location in 1636. It was founded as a boys school but became coed in 1986 when the school amalgamated with the Dungannon High School for Girls. It has four 'sister' schools, The Royal School, Armagh in Armagh, County Armagh, The Enniskillen Royal Grammar School in Enniskillen, County Fermanagh, The Royal School Cavan in County Cavan, and the Royal and Prior School in Raphoe, County Donegal. The original intention had been to have a "Royal School" in each of Ireland's counties (James I Order in Council read, "that there shall be one Free School at least appointed in every County, for the education of youth in learning and religion.") but only five were actually established, the schools planned for other counties never coming into being.

== History ==
The Royal School, Dungannon is one of several Royal Schools ordered in 1608 by James I with the intended purpose "that there shall be one Free School at least appointed in every County, for the education of youth in learning and religion." These schools provided an English style education to the sons of landed settlers in Ireland, most of whom were of Scottish or English descent. A royal charter of 13 May 1614 records the appointment of John Bullingbroke as the first headmaster.

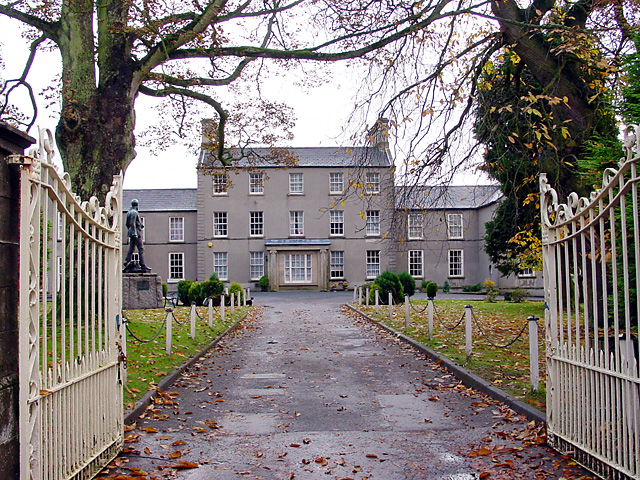
Royal School, Dungannon

== Royal School for Girls ==
The Royal School for Girls was founded in 1889 and was known as the "Girls' Department" (until at least 1908) housed in the Robinson (North) wing of the Royal School between 1892 and 1926. This school became Dungannon High School for Girls in a self-contained campus adjoining Royal School lands on Ranfurly Road. In 1986 the high school was re-merged with the Royal School.

== Motto and colours ==
The Royal School Dungannon's motto is 'Perseverando', Latin for 'by persevering'. It is sometimes interpreted as 'never say die' however their strapline, 'Excellence Through Perseverance', reflects the original translation more closely. The school motto was only introduced in 1986, when the Royal School Dungannon merged with the Girls' High School, adopting their motto as its own. Previous to this RSD did not have any form of motto.

The school colours, chocolate and magenta ( ), were adopted in 1870. They are shared by two other UK schools: Fettes College in Edinburgh and the rugby colours of Bradford Grammar School.

== Houses ==
A house system exists to facilitate healthy sporting and academic competition. All students are assigned a house upon enrolling – where possible this is the same house as assigned to a previous relative at the school.

The current houses are named below. The names in brackets indicate the full name of each house given when the amalgamation with Dungannon High School for Girls in 1986 incorporated the high school's own house system. 1986 names follow the original, historic Royal School names.

- Mountjoy (now, Mountjoy-Ranfurly);
- Bullingbrook (now, Bullingbrook-Tyrone);
- Beresford (now, Beresford-Charlemount);
- Nicholson (now, Nicholson-Dungannon).

The names of houses refer to notable past headmasters, alumni or local geography.

== Notable alumni and staff ==
- Margaret Barrington, (1896-1982), author.
- Thomas Bloomer, (1894–1984), Anglican Bishop of Carlisle.
- Francis Brinkley,(1841–1912), newspaper proprietor and scholar of Japanese culture.
- Darren Clarke, (born 1968), professional golfer.
- Richard Collins, Privy Councillor, and judge at Oscar Wilde's libel action against the Marquis of Queensberry in 1895.
- Joseph Stirling Coyne (1803–1868), playwright.
- Bill Craig, (1924–2011), politician.
- Sir William Crossley, 1st Baronet, (1844–1911), engineer
- John Richard Darley, (1799–1884), bishop of the United Diocese of Kilmore, Elphin and Ardagh.
- Sir Frederick Matthew Darley, (1830–1910), judge and politician.
- Abraham Dawson (Dean of Dromore), (1826–1905), Archdeacon of Dromore.
- James Dilworth, (1815–1894),founder of Dilworth School, New Zealand.
- Richard Dowse, (1824–1890), judge and politician.
- George Kelly Dunlop (1830–1888). Anglican bishop
- Andrew Robert Fausset (1821–1910), Canon of York, Church of England clergyman and author.
- Sylvia Hermon, (born 1955), politician, ex Dungannon High School.
- George Higinbotham (1826–1892), judge
- Waller Hobson (1851–1924), Anglican Archdeacon of Armagh.
- Hugh Holmes (1840–1916), politician and judge.
- Paddy Johns, (born 1968), football player.
- Joseph Johnston, (1890–1972), politician.
- William King (bishop) (1650–1729), Archbishop of Dublin.
- Robert Foster Kennedy (1884–1952), neurologist.
- Francis Fowke (1823–1865), designer of the Royal Albert Hall, London.
- Hugh Law, (1818–1883), Lord Chancellor of Ireland
- Robert William Lowry, (1824–1905), soldier .

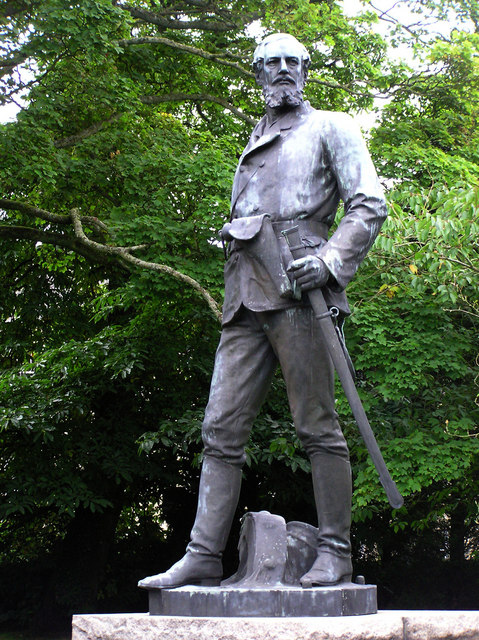
John Nicholson's statue in the grounds of Dungannon Royal School

- Dominick McCausland, (1806–1873), judge and writer.
- James Carlile McCoan (1829–1904), politician and journalist.
- Ken Maginnis (born 1938), politician.
- W.F. Marshall (1888–1959), Presbyterian clergyman, wrote the school song.
- Lindsay Mason (1945–2006), politician.
- Kris Meeke, (born 1979), racecar driver.
- William Flavelle Monypenny (1866–1912), writer.
- Peter Nelson (born 1992), rugby player.
- John Nicholson (1821–1857), soldier.
- Sir William Olpherts (1822–1902), soldier.
- Thomas Orr (1857–1937), politician.
- David Pollock (born 1987), rugby player.
- Nicholas McKelvey, (born 1991), skier. 2011 World Universiade Winter Games in Erzurum, Turkey & 2007 European Youth Olympic Festival in Jaca, Spain.
- Alexander George Richey (1830–1883), historian.
- Joanne Salley (born 1977), artist and television presenter.
- Victor Sloan (born 1945), artist.
- Robertson Smyth (1879–1916), rugby player.
- Frederick Thomas Trouton (1863–1922), physicist.
- James Swanton Waugh (1822–1898), Wesleyan clergyman.
- Sir Francis Verner Wylie (1891–1970), civil servant.
- Gerald Francis Yeo, (1845–1909), physiologist.
