= BJ Banda =

Irish footballer (born 1998)

Personal information
- Full name: Billy Banda Jr
- Date of birth: June 1, 1998 (age 28)
- Place of birth: Johannesburg, South Africa
- Position: Striker

Senior career*
Years	Team	Apps	(Gls)
2015–2018	Finn Harps	21	(5)
2018–2021	Letterkenny Rovers		
2021–2022	Ballinamallard United	56	(22)
2023	Larne	4	(0)
2023	Finn Harps	15	(3)
2024	Institute	11	(0)
2024–	Letterkenny Rovers		
- * Club domestic league appearances and goals

Billy Banda Jr (born 1 June 1998) is an Irish footballer who plays as a forward for Letterkenny Rovers.

== Early life ==
Banda was born on 1 June 1998 in Johannesburg, South Africa and has a sister. A native of County Donegal, Ireland, he attended the Royal and Prior School in Ireland.

== Career ==
Banda started his career with Irish side Finn Harps, helping the club achieve promotion from the second tier to the top flight. In 2018, he signed for Irish side Letterkenny Rovers. Subsequently, he signed for Northern Irish side Ballinamallard United, where he was regarded as one of the club's most important players.

Two years later, he signed for Northern Irish side Larne, helping the club win the league title. The same year, he returned to Irish side Finn Harps. Following his stint there, he signed for Northern Irish side Institute in 2024 before signing for Irish side Letterkenny Rovers.
