= George Gardiner (VC) =

Recipient of the Victoria Cross

George Gardiner VC DCM
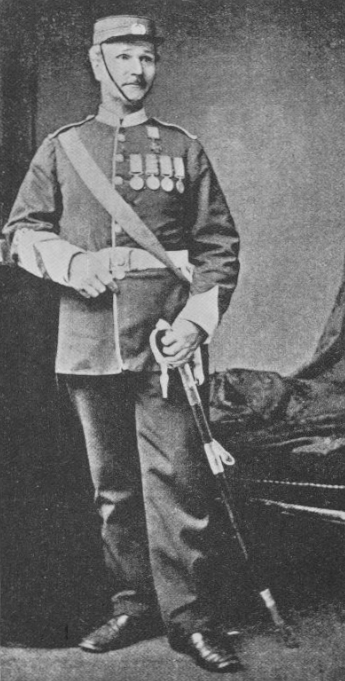
- Born: c. 1821; Warrenpoint, County Down
- Died: 17 November 1891 (aged 69–70); Lifford, County Donegal
- Burial place: Clonleigh Churchyard, Lifford
- Military career
- Allegiance: United Kingdom
- Branch: British Army
- Rank: Colour-Sergeant
- Units: 57th Regiment of Foot
- Conflicts: Crimean War; New Zealand Wars
- Awards: Victoria Cross; Distinguished Conduct Medal; Crimea Medal with Balaclava, Inkermann, Sebastopol clasps; New Zealand War Medal, 1860–66; Long Service & Good Conduct Medal; Turkish Crimea Medal

George Gardiner VC DCM (c. 1821 – 17 November 1891) was born in Clonallon, Warrenpoint, County Down and was an Irish recipient of the Victoria Cross, the highest and most prestigious award for gallantry in the face of the enemy that can be awarded to British and Commonwealth forces.

== Details ==
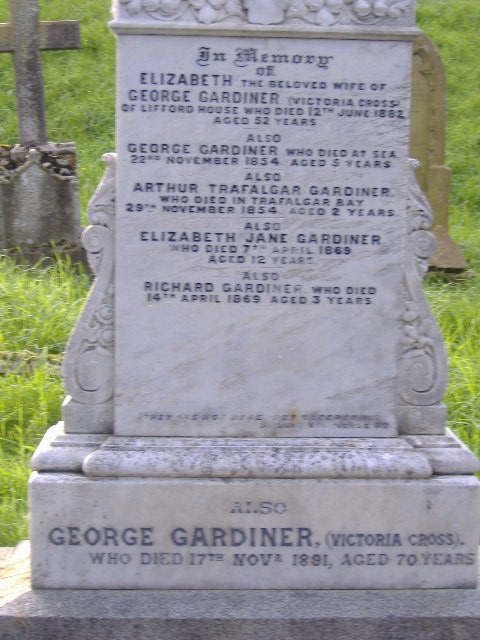
Gardiner's grave at Clonleigh Churchyard

He was about 34 years old, and a sergeant in the 57th Regiment of Foot (later The Middlesex Regiment (Duke of Cambridge's Own)), British Army during the Crimean War when the following deed took place for which he was awarded the VC.

On 22 March 1855 at Sebastopol, Crimea, Sergeant Gardiner acted with great gallantry upon the occasion of a sortie by the enemy, in having rallied the covering parties which had been driven in by the Russians, thus regaining the trenches. On 18 June during the attack on the Redan he himself remained and encouraged others to remain in the holes made by the explosions of the shells, and whence they were able to keep up a continuous fire until their ammunition was exhausted, and the enemy cleared away from the parapet.

He later achieved the rank of Colour-Sergeant. He died at Lifford, County Donegal, 17 November 1891. He is buried at Clonleigh Church of Ireland Churchyard, Lifford.

His Victoria Cross is displayed at the Princess of Wales's Royal Regiment (Queen's and Royal Hampshires), Dover Castle, England.
