= William Kay (journalist) =

William Kay is a British financial and business journalist.

== Family and education ==
William Kay grew up in central London where he attended St Marylebone CofE primary School and Westminster City School. In 1965 he was awarded an Open Styring Scholarship to read Philosophy, Politics, and Economics (PPE) at The Queen's College, Oxford. In 1968 he received a BA (Hons) and subsequently a MA. He attended UCLA's Professional Screenwriting course in 2014-15, and its Advanced Screenwriting course in 2017. In 2006 Kay accepted an invitation to emigrate to the United States as "an alien of extraordinary ability". He became a US citizen in 2011, whilst retaining his British nationality. He lived in Pasadena, California, where, until 2013, he continued to write a weekly financial advice column for The Sunday Times of London. Kay returned to London permanently in 2019 and renounced US citizenship later that year. He now writes obituaries of British business figures for The Times of London, and contributes to the investment column Tempus in the same newspaper. He lives with Lynne Bateson, also a journalist, and has two adult sons, Andrew and Ben, and two grandchildren, Jackson and Arrow.

== Career ==
Kay was on the staffs of the London Evening Standard and the now-defunct London Evening News in the early years of his career, and has been freelancing, writing books and working for UK national newspapers since then.

The British edition of Who's Who records that William Kay has been the City Editor, Financial Editor, Money Editor or Personal Finance Editor of five British newspapers: The Times, The Sunday Times, The Independent, The Independent on Sunday and Mail on Sunday. Kay has also worked on the Daily Telegraph (1977–79) and the short-lived NOW! news magazine. In 2009 Kay published his first novel, Pasadena Parade, a murder mystery set in Pasadena, California. He has subsequently written two screenplays based on that book, and another half-dozen screenplays since then.

== Awards ==
- 2002: Wincott Foundation, Personal Financial Journalist of the Year Award.
- 2005: Headline Money, Columnist of the Year (consumer media) Award.
- 2005: Association of British Insurers, Lifetime Achievement Award.

== Books ==
- 2013: (ghost) "The Tao of Comedy" by Bobbie Oliver. CreateSpace. ISBN 978-1-4826-4074-8.
- 2009: Pasadena Parade, a novel. Booksurge. ISBN 978-1-4392-5112-6.
- 1999: Lord of the Dance, the story of Sir Gerry Robinson. Orion. ISBN 0-7528-1048-0.
- 1994: The Bosses: The Growth Industries of the Future and the Men Who Lead Them. London: Piatkus. ISBN 978-0-7499-1358-8.
- 1993: (ghost). Charity Appeals: The Complete Guide to Success, by Marion Allford Dent. JM Dent in association with the Institute of Fundraising Managers. Paperback: ISBN 978-0-460-86191-5.
- 1991: (editor) The City and the Single European Market. New York: Woodhead-Faulkner. ISBN 0-85941-662-3.
- 1990: (editor) Clay and Wheble's Modern Merchant Banking: A Guide to the Workings of the Accepting Houses of the City of London and Their Services to Industry and Commerce. Abington, Cambridge: Woodhead-Faulkner. ISBN 978-0-85941-602-3.
- 1989: (ghost) Nightmare: Ernest Saunders and the Guinness Affair, by James Saunders. Arrow Books. ISBN 0-09-974480-5.
- 1987: Battle for the High Street. London: Piatkus. ISBN 978-0-86188-621-0.
- 1987: (editor) The Stock Exchange: a Marketplace for Tomorrow. London: Sterling. Folio: ISBN 0-902570-30-7.
- 1986: The Big Bang: An Investor's Guide to the Changing City. London: Weidenfeld & Nicolson. ISBN 978-0-297-78984-0.
- 1985: Tycoons: Where They Came From and How They Made it. Salem, New Hampshire: Salem House. ISBN 978-0-88162-159-4.
- 1983: A-Z Guide to Money. London: Constable. ISBN 0-09-467160-5.
