= Drumkeen =

Village in County Donegal, Ireland

Drumkeen Droim Caoin
- Village
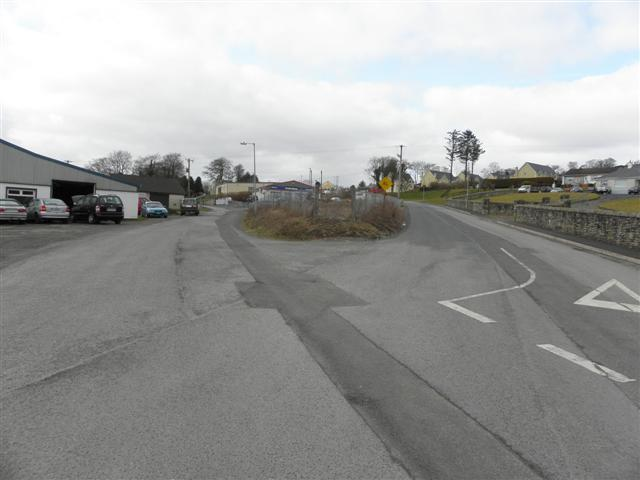

- Location in Ireland
- Coordinates: 54°52′01″N 7°45′26″W
- Country: Ireland
- Province: Ulster
- County: County Donegal
- Barony: Raphoe North

Population (2022)
  - Total: 333

Drumkeen (Irish: Droim Caoin, meaning 'beautiful ridge') is a village and townland in the east of County Donegal in Ulster, the northern province in Ireland. The village is near the N13 primary road, about 8 kilometres (5 mi) west of Convoy. The village population was 333 at the 2022 census. The local football (or 'soccer') club, Drumkeen United, play at St Patrick's Park. The village is located just above the Burn Dale, which flows along the southern edge of the village. Drumkeen is the 660th biggest town-land and has an area of 2.2662 km2.
