= N14 road (Ireland) =

Road in Ireland

N14 road
- Bóthar N14

Route information
- Length: 17.48 km (10.86 mi)

Location
- Country: Ireland
- Primary destinations: County Donegal; (N13 near Manorcunningham); Lifford * (N15, A38 to Strabane)

Highway system
- Roads in Ireland; Motorways; Primary; Secondary; Regional

The N14 road is a national primary road in the Republic of Ireland. The entirety of the route is located in the northwest of Ireland, in County Donegal, connecting Manorcunningham (approx. 10 kilometres outside Letterkenny in the centre of the county) to Lifford in the east. Here it connects to the N15 near the border with Northern Ireland and along the A38 to Strabane in County Tyrone.

== Route ==
The route commences at the Manorcunningham Roundabout just outside Letterkenny, where the N13 continues north-east towards Derry. The N14 continues south-east past the hamlet of Drumoghill, crosses the R236, continuing through the townlands of Drumbeg and Rossgeir, crossing the Burn Dale, a burn or small river also known as the Burn Deele, at Mulrine's Bridge on the north-western outskirts of Lifford.

At Rossgeir, the N14 joins the R265 (connecting St Johnston) and entering into Lifford from the north. The N15 comes to an end at the western side of a junction with the N14 in the town centre. The latter route, having entered the junction from the south, turns east to end at Lifford Bridge, between Lifford and Strabane (the A38 road continues into Strabane).

Previously, the section of road between the Polestar Roundabout (also known as the Port Roundabout) and the Dry Arch Roundabout (which is now classified as the N56) was a part of the N14. Before this, the N56 stretched out to Stranorlar from Letterkenny.

== Upgrades ==
At present, the section between where the N14 begins and where it ends in Lifford, has not been upgraded. However, a cross-border project has been in the planning since at least 2006, with 18 km (11 mi) of 2+1 road planned between the N13/N14 junction and Strabane. This includes work across the border in County Tyrone in Northern Ireland, providing an upgraded route onto the current A5.

The route is to commence at the N13/N14 junction near Manorcunningham, just south-east of Letterkenny, and proceed southeast, bypassing Lifford to the south and crossing the N15. It will proceed across the River Finn (and international border), to meet the Strabane Bypass portion of the A5.

The Compulsory Purchase Order (CPO) and Environmental Impact Statement (EIS) for the route was expected to be published in 2006. Following this, oral hearings were expected to be organised by An Bord Pleanála (the Republic of Ireland's planning board) in 2007 as part of the CPO/EIS procedures. It was expected that the design and tender/procurement process would continue into 2008, with construction beginning later that year and ending in 2010.

As of 2008, on the National Roads Authority website "road scheme activity" section, the N14 is stated to be still at "Preliminary Design" stage.

== See also ==
- Roads in Ireland
- Motorways in Ireland
- National secondary road
- Regional road
