= Gerry Robinson =

Irish-born British businessman and television presenter (1948–2021)

- Born: Gerrard Jude Robinson; 23 October 1948; Dunfanaghy, County Donegal, Ireland
- Died: 14 October 2021 (aged 72)
- Occupations: Business executive; television presenter

Sir Gerrard Jude Robinson (23 October 1948 – 14 October 2021) was an Irish-born British business executive and television presenter. He was non-executive chairman of Allied Domecq and chairman/chief executive of Granada.

== Early life ==
Robinson was born in Dunfanaghy, County Donegal, Ireland, the ninth of ten children born to Anthony and Elizabeth Robinson, an Irish father and a Scottish mother. They moved to England in his early teens.

He trained to become a Catholic priest at St. Mary's Seminary of the Holy Ghost Fathers at Castlehead, Grange-over-Sands, Lancashire, and he later began a career in accounting in 1965 as a clerk with the Matchbox Toys company. While with the firm, he progressed through accounting roles to become Chief Management Accountant in 1974. During that time, he also qualified as an Associate Chartered Management Accountant.

== Career ==
In 1974, he left Matchbox to work for Lex Vehicle Leasing as a management accountant. He rose through the company before being appointed finance director. In 1980, he joined the UK franchise of Coca-Cola, owned at that time by Grand Metropolitan. In 1983, he was appointed managing director of Grand Metropolitan's international services division. In 1987, he led the successful £163m management buy-out of the loss-making contract services and catering division of Compass Group, known as Compass Caterers.

Robinson joined Granada as CEO in 1991, but quickly made himself unpopular by ousting Granada's chairman David Plowright in 1992. This caused outcry within the television industry (John Cleese sent Robinson a fax with the message "Fuck off out of it, you ignorant upstart caterer"), and in a mark of solidarity to Plowright, all Granada programmes transmitted on the evening of 3 February 1992 contained amended end credits listing Plowright as producer.

Robinson retained the company through mergers and hostile takeovers including those of London Weekend Television (1993) and Forte Group (1996). In 1999, Robinson was the subject of a biography, Lord of the Dance, written by business journalist William Kay, and published by Orion Business Books ISBN 0752810480. In 2005, he made an unsuccessful attempt to both oust Doug Flynn as CEO of Rentokil Initial and install himself as executive chairman for a 5% stake in the company, then valued at £56M.

== Television ==
Robinson's first foray into broadcasting was I'll Show Them Who's Boss, co-produced by the BBC and the Open University in 2003. Robinson went into struggling businesses to try to turn them around with advice and mentoring. It was similar to the BBC's Troubleshooter show, presented by Sir John Harvey-Jones in the early 1990s.

In January 2007, following a similar format, Robinson presented a three-part series, Can Gerry Robinson Fix the NHS? as he attempted to reduce waiting lists at Rotherham General Hospital. He returned a year later for a sequel, Can Gerry Robinson Fix the NHS? One Year On. In December 2009, Robinson presented Can Gerry Robinson Fix Dementia Care Homes?.

In June 2009, he presented a special edition of The Money Programme entitled Gerry Robinson's Car Crash investigating the history and future of the British motor industry. He regularly appeared on British TV as a celebrity businessman. In July 2009, he started a TV series called Gerry's Big Decision, in which he reviewed struggling companies to decide whether it was worth investing his own money to save them. From 14 January – 18 February 2011 he presented BBC2 show Can't Take It with You, which helped people to write their wills.

== Other affiliations ==
For six years from 1998, Robinson served as chairman of the Arts Council England, in which capacity he was one of the many victims of spoofs by British comedian Ali G.

== Politics ==
Although originally a Conservative Party supporter, he supported Tony Blair and starred in a Labour Party election broadcast, saying that "... frankly, there's only one party that can represent Britain best, getting business right, and that's New Labour".

In June 2008, Robinson was one of four Labour donors who expressed their concerns with Gordon Brown's leadership and stated he would not be contributing any more money to the Labour Party until there was a change of leader. He had donated £70,000 to the party between 2001 and 2005.

== Honours ==
He was knighted in the 2004 New Year Honours.

== Personal life ==
Robinson was divorced and remarried and has four children. He lived at Oakfield Demesne, Raphoe, County Donegal; he established a botanical garden with a narrow gauge railway – the Difflin Lake Railway – which is open to the public.

He died on 14 October 2021 at the age of 72.

Media offices
Preceded by Lord Gowrie	Chair of Arts Council England; 1998–2004	Succeeded by Christopher Frayling
