= Lifford =

County town of Donegal, Ireland

Lifford Leifear (Irish)
- Town
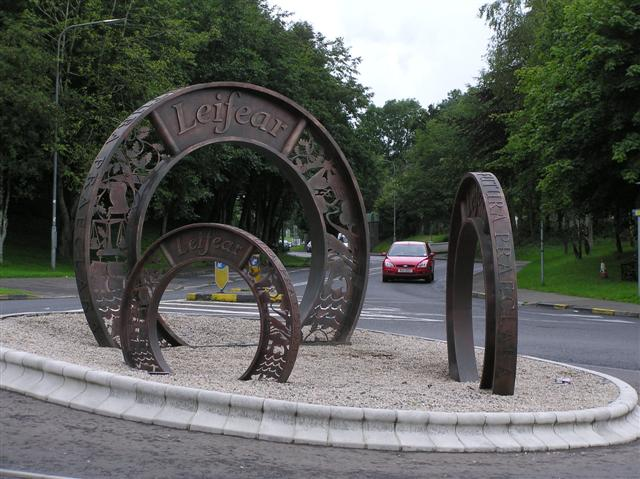
- The Three coins sculpture, Lifford

- Location in Ireland
- Coordinates: 54.834°N 7.486°W
- Country: Ireland
- Province: Ulster
- County: County Donegal
- Barony: Raphoe North
- Dáil constituency: Donegal
- Main townlad: Lifford
- Elevation: 6 m (20 ft)

Population (2022)
  - Total: 1,613
- Time zone: UTC±0 (WET)
  - Summer (DST): UTC+1 (IST)
- Eircode routing key: F93
- Telephone area code: +353(0)74
- Irish Grid Reference: H330984
- Website: donegalcoco.ie

Lifford (Irish: Leifear, historically anglicised as Liffer) is the county town of County Donegal, Ireland, the administrative centre of the county and the seat of Donegal County Council, although the town of Letterkenny is often mistaken as holding this role.

Lifford lies in the Finn Valley area of East Donegal where the River Finn meets the River Mourne to create the River Foyle. The Burn Dale (also spelt as the Burn Deele), which flows through Ballindrait, flows into the River Foyle on the northern outskirts of the town. Lifford lies across the River Foyle from Strabane (in County Tyrone, Northern Ireland) and is linked to the village by Lifford Bridge.

The original Irish name for the town was Leith Bhearr which can be translated as 'half or grey water', a description of the nearby river.

== History ==
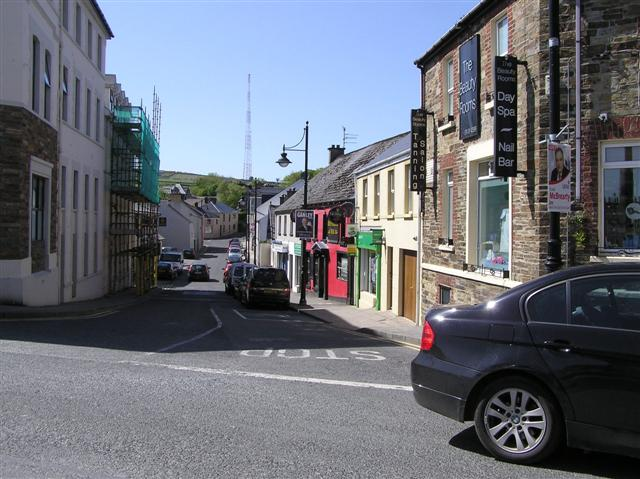
The Main Street in Lifford.

The town grew up around a castle built there by Manghus Ó Domhnaill, ruler of Tír Chonaill (mostly modern County Donegal), in the 16th century. It later became a British Army garrison town until most of Ireland won independence as a dominion called the Irish Free State in early December 1922. Manus O'Donnell began building the castle in 1527 on the Wednesday after St. Brendan's Day (Saint Brendan's feast day is celebrated on 16 May). He completed the masonry and woodwork by the end of that summer even though the O'Neills of Tír Eoghain were at war with him. In 1543 the castle of Leithbher was given to Cahir (the son of Donnell Balbh) O'Gallagher to be guarded for the O'Donnell clan. He then proceeded to banish the people loyal to the O'Donnells from the castle so that he could keep it for himself. In 1544 Calvagh went to the English Lord Justice, and brought back English soldiers with him to Tirconnell, the olden name for County Donegal. O'Donnell, Calvagh, and these men went with ‘ordnance and engines for taking towns’ to the castle of Lifford to take it back from the descendants of the O'Gallaghers.

Cahir, the son of Tuathal Balbh & Turlough, the son of Felim Fin O'Gallagher, who had been taken hostage earlier, was brought to the castle to see if the O'Gallaghers would surrender. Which they would not. As the English attacked one was killed instantly so they killed Cahir, the son of Tuathal on the spot. The castle was then surrendered to O'Donnell to spare the life of Turlough, the son of Felim Fin and another son of Tuathal Balbh. Lifford Castle is no longer standing but there is a poem from the late 16th century about the castle, which describes the owners and surroundings at the time.

"A beloved dwelling is the castle of Lifford, homestead of a wealth abounding encampment; forge of hospitality for the men of Ulster, a dwelling it is hard to leave.
Beloved are the two who keep that house without excess, without lack; the ward of the stout, even-surfaced tower are the supporting pillars of the province.
Short is the day, no matter what its length, in the company of the royal warrior of Conchobhar's Plain; fleet are the long days from the lady of bright-walled Tara.
The daughter of noble Shane O'Neill, and the son of O'Donnell of Dún Iomgháin—they are in the ancient, comely dwelling as entertainers of guests.
Dear the hostel in which these are wont to be, dear the folk who dwell in the hostel; the people of the house and the house of that people happy is any who shall get honor such as theirs.
Beloved the delightful, lofty building, its tables, its coverlets, its cupboards; its wondrous, handsome, firm walls, its smooth marble arches.
Beloved is the castle in which we used to spend a while at chess-playing, a while with the daughters of the men of Bregia, a while with the fair books of the poets.
The fortress of smooth-lawned Lifford no one in the world can leave it once it is found; that dwelling is the Durlas of the north.
Or else it is Eamhain which used to vary in form, or Croghan of the children of Mágha, or Tara of the race of Cobhthach—this bright castle, rich in trees and horses.
Or it is Naas, the fortress of Leinster, as it was first fashioned; or the fertile, ancient abode of the children of Corc, green, conspicuous Cashel.
Or it is fair Lifford itself—hardly is any of these castles better—which hath of yore assumed those shapes ye are wont to hold dear".

The Battle of Lifford was fought in 1600 during Tyrone's Rebellion.

Following the defeat of O'Doherty's Rebellion at the Battle of Kilmacrennan in 1608, a number of captured rebels were brought to Lifford where they were tried by Irish civilian courts and executed. The most notable rebel to be executed was Phelim Reagh MacDavitt.

The population in 1841 was 752.

Lifford achieved national recognition in the 2008 Tidy Towns Awards as the best newcomer to the competition in Category 'C'.

== Political representation ==
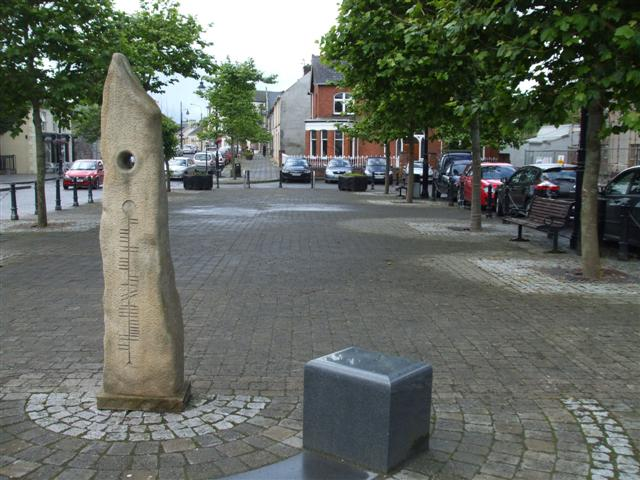
Ogham stone in the Diamond, Lifford.

The borough constituency of Lifford elected two MPs to the Irish House of Commons from 1692 until 1800. It was disfranchised under the Acts of Union 1800. The borough corporation of the town was abolished under the Municipal Corporations (Ireland) Act 1840.

Lifford is part of the Dáil constituency of Donegal.

For elections to Donegal County Council, it is part of the local electoral area of Lifford–Stranorlar. This area also forms a municipal district.

== Demographics ==
Lifford has a population of 1,613 as of the 2022 census, a decrease of 13 on the 2016 census. Of the 1,626 residents in 2016, 794 were male and 832 female.

Lifford is part of the Civil Parish of Clonleigh; with a population of 3,547, the parish is subdivided for electoral purposes into two separate Electoral Districts: Clonleigh North and Clonleigh South, which are mainly separated by the Burn Dale. In 2016, the population of Clonleigh North was 1,374 (711 male and 663 female) and in Clonleigh South the 2016 population was 2,173 (1,078 male and 1,095 female).

== Education ==
Lifford is served by several schools, all of which are primary ("National") schools. For second-level education students must travel elsewhere, with Raphoe or Stranorlar, or Strabane in Northern Ireland, being popular options.

Primary schools in Lifford are:

- St. Patrick's (Murlog National School). In 2012/13 Enrolment was: Boys: 99, Girls: 63. (Total pupils 162) and in the 2020/21 school year the enrolment numbers had increased to: 96 Boys and 83 Girls (Total pupils 179).
- Scoil Mhuire gan Smal (Lifford National School). in 2012/13 Enrolment was: Boys: 52, Girls: 50 (Total pupils 102). and in the 2020/21 school year, the enrolment numbers had a slight increase to Boys 57 and Girls 50 (Total pupils 107).
- Scoil Cholmcille Naofa (Ballylast National School). In 2012/13 Enrolment was: Boys: 34, Girls: 34 (Total pupils 68). and in the 2020/21 school year, the enrolment numbers had decreased to 18 Boys and 18 Girls (Total pupils 36).
- Scoil Bhrighde (Boyagh National School). Enrolment in the 2012/13 school year was Boys: 17 and Girls: 18 (Total pupils 35). Boyagh National School closed permanently in March 2018.
- Scoil Cholmcille (Cloughfin National School). In 2012/13 Enrolment was: Boys: 11, Girls: 21. (Total pupils 32) and in the 2020/21 school year the enrolment was 12 boys and 20 girls (Total pupils 32).

There were other primary schools in the parish but these are long since closed, namely Blackrock National School and Ballindrait National School. The Prior Endowed School and The Hansard Grammar School were fee-paying schools in Lifford and are now also closed.

== Historical buildings and places of interest ==
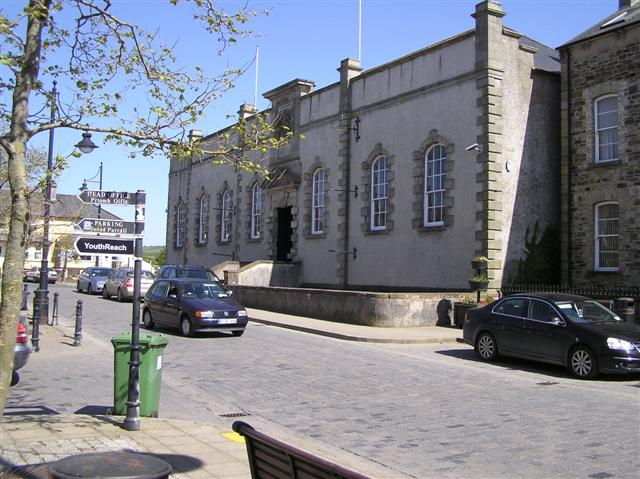
Old Courthouse, Lifford.

=== Lifford Courthouse ===
Lifford Courthouse is now a restaurant and heritage centre and is located across from the County House, the HQ of Donegal County Council, in The Diamond area of the town. The courthouse was designed by Michael Priestly of Dublin and built in 1746. The museum houses a permanent display of O'Donnell clan documents and artefacts, as well as minute books from various institutes in County Donegal. It also houses some of the original cells belonging to the Courthouse.

=== Lifford Gaol ===
Lifford Gaol was formerly the County Gaol or prison for all of County Donegal. It was located on the northeastern side of The Diamond. The old gaol was demolished in 1907.

=== Cavanacor House ===
Cavanacor House is located just off the N14 on the outskirts of the town - which one ancestral home of the 11th President of the United States of America, James Knox Polk. His great, great, great-grandmother (Magdelene Tasker) was born here in 1634, she later married Capt. Robert Bruce Pollock and emigrated to the US. King James II & VII dined at Cavanacor House on his way to the Siege of Derry in 1689.

=== Prior Endowed School ===
The school was built in 1880 to cater for local Protestant children with monies bequeathed by Miss Eleanor Prior from nearby Ballindrait. The Prior School closed in 1972, being amalgamated with The Royal School in Raphoe to create The Royal & Prior Comprehensive School. The school and grounds were first taken over by the then Irish Department of Posts and Telegraphs, and later (from 1974) by the Irish Defence Forces for use as a military barracks. The Barracks has since closed along with Rockhill House Military Post in Letterkenny, on 31 January 2009.

=== St. Lugadius's Church ===
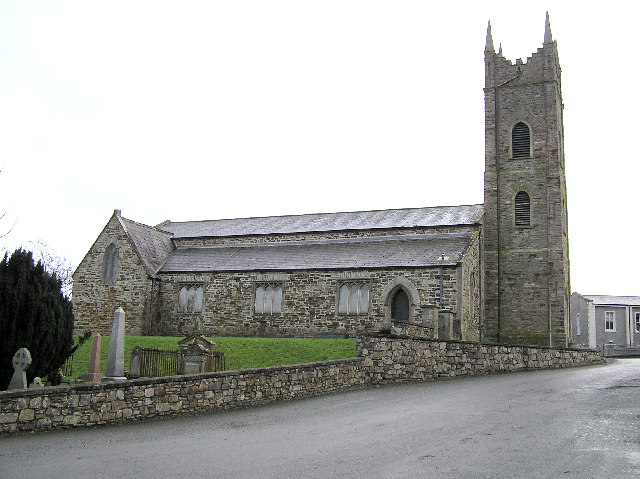
St. Lugadius Church of Ireland Church in Lifford.

St. Lugadius's, also known as Clonleigh (Church of Ireland) Parish Church, was built in 1621. Sir Richard Hansard, who had been granted land at Lifford, directed in his will that a church be built in Lifford. There is a monument to Sir Richard and his wife Dame Anne inside the church, with a plaque on the wall detailing his wishes and who the executors of his will were. In the graveyard George Gardiner, who won a Victoria Cross during the Crimean War in 1855, is buried.

=== St. Patrick's Church ===
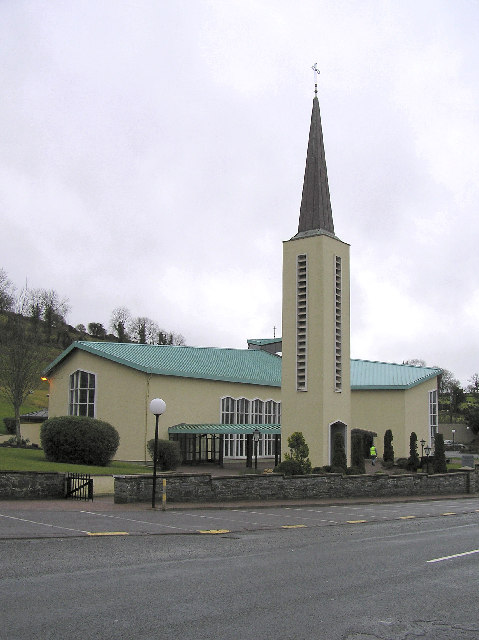
St. Patrick's Church at Murlog, Lifford

St. Patrick's Church, usually known locally as Murlog Chapel, is the second Catholic church on the present site. The first church was built here at Murlog in the 18th century after the Earl of Erne saw Catholic worshippers praying in the open. The church was later demolished to make way for the new church which was built in 1963. A three-stage gothic tower dating from about 1820 was attached to the old church and was saved by the parish; it is still standing next to the new church. The church is in the parish of Clonleigh, formerly Clonleigh and Camus until it was established as an independent parish in 1974.

=== Lifford Community Hospital ===
The hospital was once the County Hospital catering for all of County Donegal. It is located on the banks of the River Foyle just before the bridge into County Tyrone. Although this is not the first location of the County Hospital, It was originally in the diamond area of the town in a place called the Barrack yard. The Hospital first opened in this location in 1773. The first surgeon was a man called Mr. William Hamilton from nearby Strabane. In 1780 it was proposed to move to new premises with the Cavalry Barracks and stables in the town being sought, it was not until 1799 that the premises were renovated and ready to be occupied. In the early 1900s, the hospital was operating at full strength with the Maternity and Surgical wards treating on average 400 patients and carrying out around 350 operations annually. The hospital today caters for long and short-term residents by providing a convalescent and respite service. Physiotherapy and chiropody services are also provided in the hospital for the in-patients and out-patients from the greater East Donegal area.

=== Hansard's Grammar School ===
The will of Sir Richard Hansard in 1619, endowed a private school, in Lifford. The will provided for 30 pounds sterling a year for a master, and 20 pounds sterling a year for an usher. The school was intended to cater for classical studies. All children of Clonleigh parish were to be entitled to attend for free education. Hansards' Grammar School commenced operations in 1697. In 1791, the Commissioners of Education reported that there were no free scholars in the school out of an attendance of 18, of whom 6 were boarders. The Commissioners of 1807–1812 reported the school as being in a very unsatisfactory condition. While the headmaster and usher were being paid salaries according to the endowment, the teaching had been handed off to a third person on a wage of 6 pounds sterling a year. Furthermore, classical subjects were not being taught, only arithmetic. The school continued in decline until 1840, when an inspection by the Commissioners precipitated the resignation of the master, who was accused of major neglect. Attendance which had been as low as three pupils rapidly increased under a new classical teacher. Sometime before 1856, the Earl Erne (whose family, the Creightons / Crichtons, had originally settled in Ulster at Lifford before moving south to County Fermanagh), on behalf of the Church of Ireland Bishop of Derry and Raphoe, converted the school into an English-style school, and hired a master and mistress. Both were dismissed in 1856. At this time there was a dwelling house attached to the school, lived in by a previous master. In 1857, the school was reopened as an English school under the management of the Bishop of Derry and Raphoe.

== Transport ==
=== Road ===
Lifford is known as the "Gateway to Donegal"; this is because it is the first town in County Donegal encountered when travelling from Dublin on the N2 (A5/A38 through County Tyrone). Drivers cross Lifford Bridge as they enter Lifford. Two national primary routes, the N15 to Sligo via Stranorlar, Donegal Town and Ballyshannon and also the N14 to Letterkenny, take travellers to all parts in the county. There is also the R265/R236/A40 national secondary route to Derry City. Lifford has several daily bus services operated by Bus Éireann to Dublin Airport / Dublin City Centre (Busáras). They also serve Letterkenny and Ballybofey, where connections can be had for travelling onwards to Sligo with its railway station and bus station. Lifford is also very close to Strabane Bus Depot, located on Bradley Way in Strabane. From here, Ulsterbus operate services to Derry, Belfast, Omagh and other places in Northern Ireland.

=== Air ===
City of Derry Airport is the nearest airport to Lifford, located about 20 miles (32 km) away.

=== Railway ===
Lifford Halt railway station opened on 1 January 1909 and finally closed on 1 January 1960. Lifford was a stop on the Strabane to Letterkenny narrow gauge rail line. It was run by the CDR, as it was known at the time or County Donegal Railways Joint Committee. This line also stopped at Ballindrait, Raphoe and Convoy en route to Letterkenny.

The nearest railway station is Waterside Station in Derry. This station is operated by Northern Ireland Railways (N.I.R.) and runs from Derry, via Coleraine, to Belfast Lanyon Place Station and Belfast Grand Central.

== Sport ==
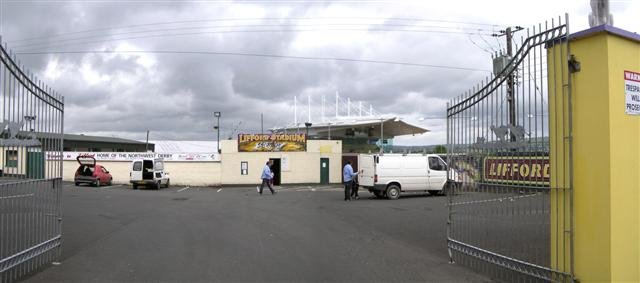
Lifford Greyhound Stadium

Lifford is home to a number of sporting clubs, including:

- Naomh Pádraig GAA Club, was founded in 1953 as Lifford GAA (Gaelic Athletic Association) Club. In 1992 the club was renamed Naomh Padraig, Leifear. The club play in the Donegal Football League Division 5, the club play their home games at Páirc MacDairmada (McDermott Park) in the Roughan.
- Lifford Celtic Football Club, which plays in Division Two (Third Tier) of the Donegal Junior Football League. Their home ground is at Greenbrae Park in Lifford. The club won the Donegal League Premier Division in the 2012/2013 season.
- Deele Harps Football Club plays in the Division Two (Third Tier) of the Donegal Junior Football League. The club was founded in 1980 and have now moved to their new purpose built football ground in Ballindrait just outside the town, with the first game played on 8 October 2023 against Drumkeen United FC.
- Lifford Strabane Athletic Club train at their athletic track and grounds in the Roughan.
- St. Patrick's (Clonleigh) Bowling Club play in the Donegal Indoor Bowling League Division Two.

== Voluntary organisations ==
Voluntary organisations in the area include the Strabane/Lifford Rotary Club (a branch of Rotary International), Lifford Youthreach (part of the Donegal Education and Training Board), and Lifford Scout Group (also known as the 19th Donegal (Lifford) Scout Group) which is a part of Scouting Ireland.

The Lifford/Clonleigh Mens Shed is a voluntary group within Irish Mens Shed Association. This men's shed group initially met up in the local resource centre and community gardens in Croaghan Heights but subsequently moved to the closed Boyagh National School in Porthall.

== Notable people ==
- Alexander Allison (1799–1862) – Lifford-born Mayor of Nashville, Tennessee, from 1847 to 1849.
- Peter Benson (c.1570-1642), builder and architect, responsible for building the Walls of Derry, was a major landowner in Lifford
- Sharon Foley (b. 1972) – athlete, senior Irish National record holder for the Heptathlon.
- George Gardiner, V.C. (1821–1891) – born near Warrenpoint, he won his V.C. at Sebastopol during the Crimean War on 22 March 1855. Died in 1891 in Lifford aged 70 and is buried in Clonleigh Churchyard.
- Shay Given (b. 1976) – Association football goalkeeper. Given was Ireland's record holder with 134 Caps (appearances) until he was overtaken by Robbie Keane.
- Mickey Joe Harte (b. 1973) – singer-songwriter who represented the Republic of Ireland in the Eurovision Song Contest in Riga, Latvia, in 2003 with the song "We've Got the World".
- Paddy Harte (1931–2018) – former Fine Gael TD for Donegal North-East and former Irish Government minister.
- William Hilton (died 1651) – Member of Parliament and High Court judge
- Senator Patrick McGowan (1926–1999) – politician. He was a member of Seanad Éireann from 1965 to 1981 and from 1987 until his death in 1999.
- Alexander Montgomery (1720–1800) – politician who represented Lifford in the Irish Parliament from 1768 to 1800. He was also High Sheriff of Donegal in 1773.
- Aodh Ruadh Ó Domhnaill (Red Hugh O'Donnell) (1572–1602) - An Ó Domhnaill (The O'Donnell) and Rí (king) of Tír Chonaill
- George Otto Simms (1910–1991) – historian who also served as Church of Ireland Primate of All Ireland and Archbishop of Armagh.
- Matthew Sweeney (1952–2018) – poet, born in Lifford but raised in Clonmany.

== See also ==
- List of populated places in the Republic of Ireland
- Viscount Lifford
