= Kildrum, County Donegal =

Village in County Donegal, Ireland

Kildrum Cúl Droma
- Village
- Location in Ireland
- Coordinates: 54°58′47″N 7°24′44″W
- Country: Ireland
- Province: Ulster
- County: County Donegal

Population (2016)
  - Total: 534
- Time zone: UTC+0 (WET)
  - Summer (DST): UTC-1 (IST (WEST))

Kildrum (Irish: Cúl Droma) is a village in County Donegal, Ireland. It is outside the village of Killea which is on the Northern Ireland border, and is around 7 kilometres (4 mi) from the centre of Derry.
