= Raphoe South =

Barony in County Donegal, Ireland

Raphoe South Ráth Bhoth Theas (Irish)
- Barony
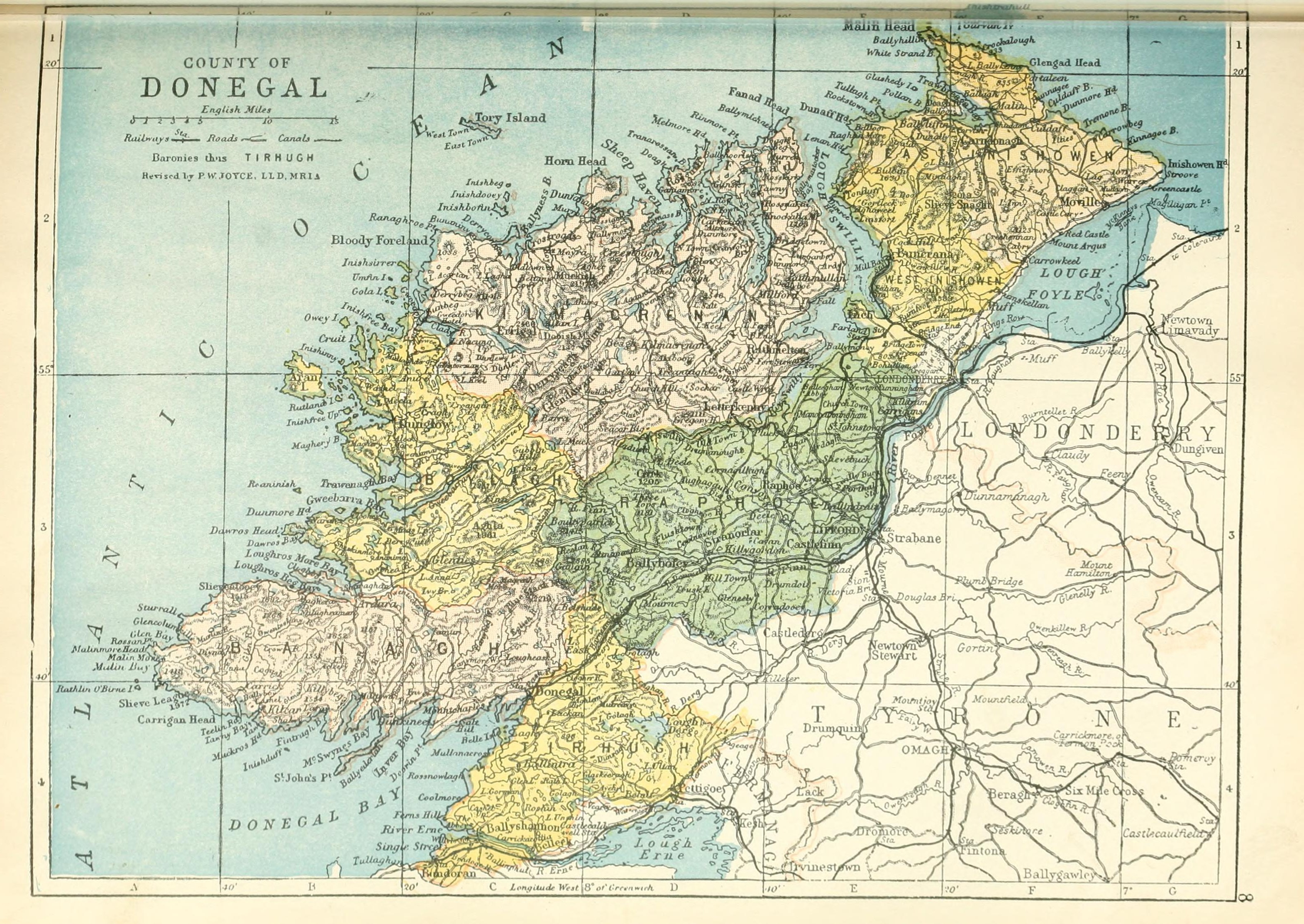
- Barony map of County Donegal, 1900; Raphoe barony is in the centre, coloured green.

- Location within Ireland
- Coordinates: 54°48′N 7°47′W
- Sovereign state: Ireland
- Province: Ulster
- County: Donegal

Area
  - Total: 569.96 km^{2} (220.06 sq mi)

Raphoe South (/ræˈfoʊ/; Irish: Ráth Bhoth Theas), or South Raphoe, is a barony in County Donegal, Ireland. Baronies were mainly cadastral rather than administrative units. They acquired modest local taxation and spending functions in the 19th century before being superseded by the Local Government (Ireland) Act 1898.

== Etymology ==
Raphoe South takes its name from Raphoe town, in Irish Ráth Bhoth, "ringfort of the huts."

== Geography ==
Raphoe South is located in the centre of County Donegal; the River Finn flows through it.

== History ==
Raphoe South was the ancient territory of the O'Mulligan, O'Pattan, McGlinchy and McCrossans. The barony of Raphoe was divided into South and North between 1807 and 1821.

== List of settlements ==
Below is a list of settlements in Raphoe South:

- Ballybofey
- Castlefinn
- Convoy
- Killygordon
