= Raphoe North =

Barony in County Donegal, Ireland

Raphoe North Ráth Bhoth Thuaidh (Irish)
- Barony
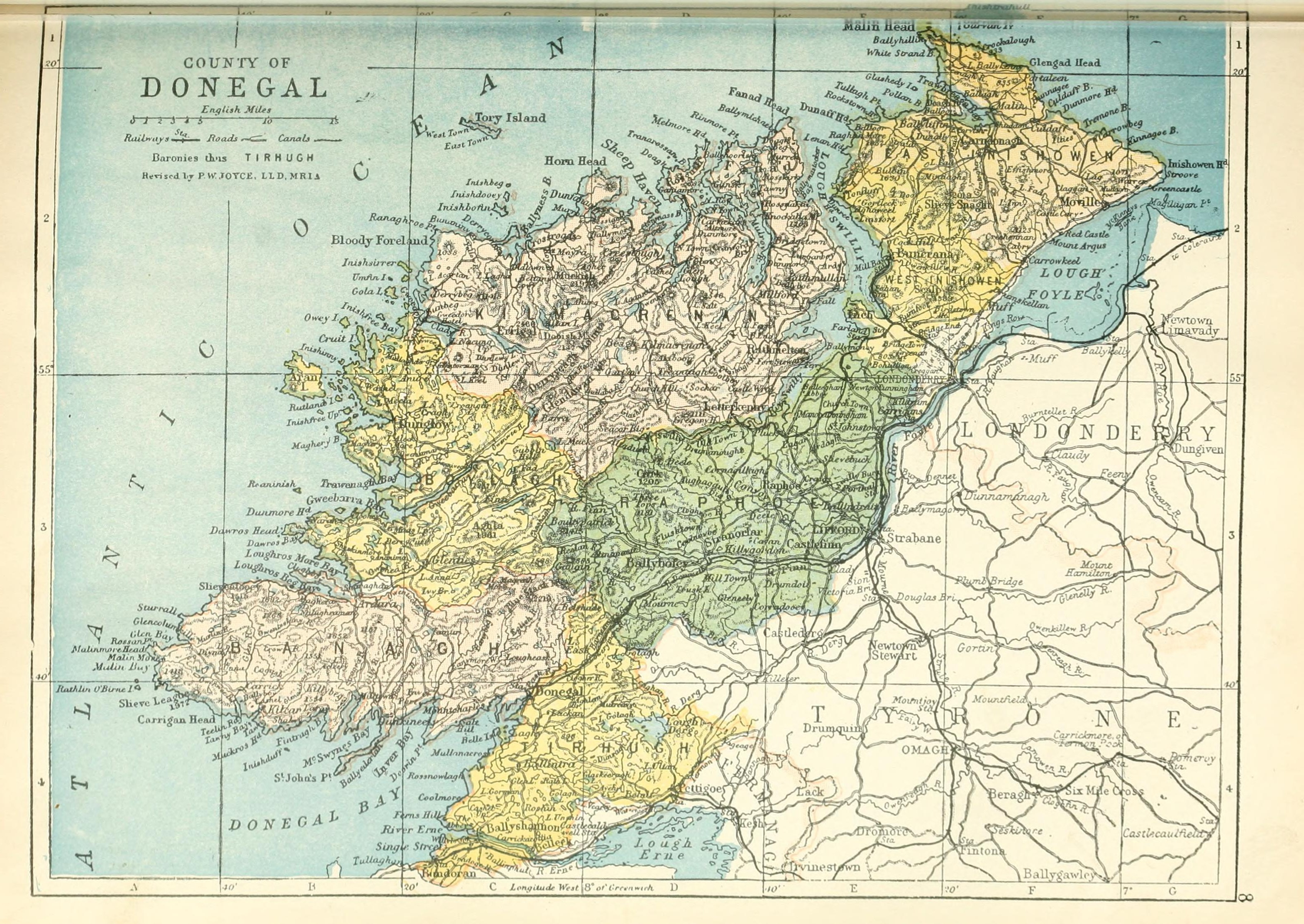
- Barony map of County Donegal, 1900; Raphoe barony is in the centre, coloured green.

- Location within Ireland
- Coordinates: 54°55′N 7°34′W
- Sovereign state: Ireland
- Province: Ulster
- County: Donegal

Area
  - Total: 326.22 km^{2} (125.95 sq mi)

Raphoe North (/ræˈfoʊ/; Irish: Ráth Bhoth Thuaidh), or North Raphoe, is a barony in County Donegal, Ireland. Baronies were mainly cadastral rather than administrative units. They acquired modest local taxation and spending functions in the 19th century before being superseded by the Local Government (Ireland) Act 1898.

== Etymology ==
Raphoe North takes its name from Raphoe town, in Irish Ráth Bhoth, "ringfort of the huts."

== Geography ==
Raphoe North is located in the east of County Donegal, to the east of the River Swilly and the west of the River Foyle; both the River Finn and the Burn Dale flow through the barony.

== History ==
Raphoe North was the ancient territory of the Mac Lochlainn, a branch of the northern Uí Néill. An area called Cinel Moen belonged to the O'Gormleys until the O'Donnells drove them out in the 14th century. Other tribes in the area were the O'Brollaghan, O'Deeney, O'Toner O'Gallagher, O'Quinn, O'Kenny, O'Cannon and O'Derry. The barony of Raphoe was divided into North and South between 1807 and 1821.

== List of settlements ==
Below is a list of settlements in Raphoe North:

- Carrigans
- Kildrum
- Lifford
- Manorcunningham
- Newtowncunningham
- Raphoe
- St Johnston
