= Ballindrait =

Village in County Donegal, Ireland

Ballindrait Baile an Droichid
- Village
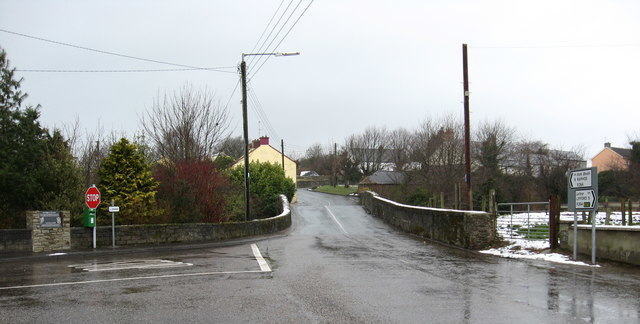
- Bridge and road junction in Ballindrait. A monument to the left of the bridge, which crosses the Burn Dale, commemorates The Earl of Tyrone's journey through Ballindrait during the 1607 Flight of the Earls.

- Location in Ireland
- Coordinates: 54.8445°N 7.5263°W
- Country: Ireland
- Province: Ulster
- County: County Donegal
- Barony: Raphoe North

Population (2022)
  - Total: 100
- Irish Grid Reference: H304997

Ballindrait (Irish: Baile an Droichid, meaning 'town of the bridge') is a townland, village and census town in County Donegal, Ireland. Located near Lifford, the village and townland of Ballindrait is in the civil parish of Clonleigh and the barony of Raphoe North. The Burn Dale flows through the centre of Ballindrait.

Ballindrait (Baile an Droichid) was designated as a census town by the Central Statistics Office (CSO) for the first time in the 2016 census, at which time it had a population of 170 people.

The former Ballindrait railway station served the area from 1909 until 1960, and was on the Strabane and Letterkenny Railway line. The R264 regional road passes through Ballindrait village, where it crosses the Burn Dale on Ballindrait Bridge (originally built c. 1740).

The Presbyterian church (within the village) was built c. 1810. St. Patrick's Church, usually known locally as Murlog Chapel, the local Catholic church (located outside the village in Murlough townland), was built in the 1960s to replace an earlier mid-19th century church. Also in Murlough townland is Ballindrait Windmill (built c. 1874).
