= Royal and Prior School =

Coordinates: 54.8761°N 7.5899°W

Royal and Prior School, Raphoe
- Raphoe, County Donegal, F93 T298; Ireland

Information
- Motto: In hoc signo vinces – (Under this sign you shall conquer)
- Religious affiliation: Christian
- Established: 1608; 418 years ago
- Founder: James I
- Principal: Howard Welch
- Staff: 50
- Gender: Mixed
- Enrolment: 562
- Colours: Blue and red
- Website: www.royalandprior.ie/home

The Royal and Prior School is a co-educational day and boarding school located in Raphoe, County Donegal. It was one of a number of 'free schools' created by James I in 1608 to provide an education to the sons of local merchants and farmers during the plantation of Ulster. It has four 'sister' schools: The Royal School, Armagh in Armagh, The Enniskillen Royal Grammar School in Enniskillen, County Fermanagh, The Royal School Cavan in County Cavan, and The Royal School Dungannon in Dungannon, County Tyrone.

== History ==
The Royal School, Donegal was one of the schools originally established as part of a plan to provide education for children of the settlers who had arrived with the Ulster Plantation. The original intention was to establish a school in the counties of Armagh, Tyrone, Londonderry, Fermanagh, Donegal and Cavan. The original school was built in Donegal Town but was relocated to Raphoe in 1661.

In 1971, the Royal School merged with the Prior School in Lifford which had been established in 1880. The newly amalgamated school, which was renamed The Royal and Prior School, was constructed just outside the town of Raphoe. It is now a mixed school which attracts students from throughout the county.

== Notable alumni and staff ==
- Elydyr William Rogers Cookman (b. 1927) – school principal
- George Simms (1910–1991) – Church of Ireland Archbishop of Armagh
- Canon David Crooks – Prebendary of Howth
- Mark Tighe – journalist and author
- Rachael Darragh (b. 1997) – badminton player
- Chloe Magee (b. 1988) - Professional badminton player and three time Olympian
- Sam Magee (b. 1989) - Professional badminton player
- Joshua Magee (b. 1994) - Professional badminton player
- Daniel Magee - High performance director of Badminton Ireland
- Keith Cowan (b. 1985) - Former professional footballer, Finn Harps F.C., Drogheda United F.C.
- Michael Funston (b. 1985) - Former professional footballer, Finn Harps F.C., Dungannon Swifts F.C.
- BJ Banda (b. 1998) - Professional football player, Finn Harps F.C., Larne F.C.
- Ricky Simms - CEO and owner of PACE Sports Management, whos clients include Usain Bolt & Mo Farah.
