= Raphoe =

Town in County Donegal, Ireland

Raphoe Ráth Bhoth
- Town
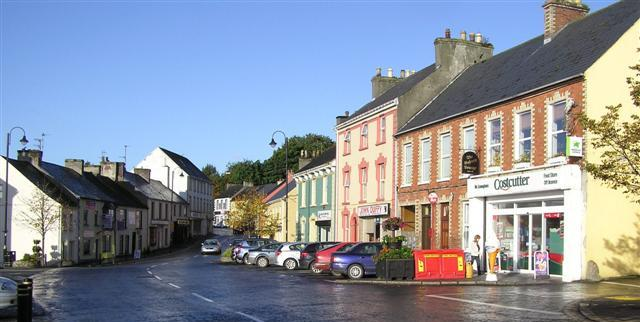
- The Diamond

- Location in Ireland
- Coordinates: 54°52′26″N 7°36′02″W
- Country: Ireland
- Province: Ulster
- County: County Donegal
- Barony: Raphoe North

Government
  - Dáil constituency: Donegal

Population (2022)
  - Total: 1,161
- Time zone: UTC+0 (WET)
  - Summer (DST): UTC-1 (IST (WEST))

Raphoe (/rəˈfoʊ/ rə-FOH; Irish: Ráth Bhoth) is a small town in County Donegal in the north-west of Ulster, the northern province in Ireland. It is the main town in the fertile district of East Donegal known as the Laggan. It gave its name to the Barony of Raphoe, which was later divided into the baronies of Raphoe North and Raphoe South, as well as to the Roman Catholic Diocese of Raphoe and the Church of Ireland (Anglican) Diocese of Derry and Raphoe. There is also a civil parish of Raphoe.

The town is 12 km south-east of Letterkenny, and 23 km south-west of Derry.

The Burn Dale (also known in English as the Burn Deele) is a burn (a small river) that flows a short distance to the south of Raphoe. The Burn Dale eventually flows, via the village of Ballindrait, into the River Foyle just north of Lifford.

== Name ==
Raphoe, historically Raffoe, comes from the Irish Ráth Bhoth, which is made up of the words ráth (fort) and both (hut). This likely refers to clay and wattle huts surrounded with a strong fortified mound. It is believed these huts were built by monks in the early Christian period.

== History ==
The rich agricultural land around Raphoe has been inhabited and cultivated for thousands of years, and evidence of this can be seen through monuments such as the Beltany stone circle, just outside the town. The stone circle is one of the largest in Ireland with a diameter of 44 metres (144 ft) and is made up of more than sixty stones in all. The site is believed to date to around 2000 BC, and it was originally an enclosed cairn. Its name is believed to be linked to the Celtic festival of fertility Beltane. Around 550 AD Columba (also known as Colmcille), one of the three patron saints of Ireland, founded a monastic settlement in the area. This site was further developed by his kinsman Eunan, (Irish form of the name Adamnan), who gives his name to the town's cathedral and is the patron saint of the Diocese of Raphoe.

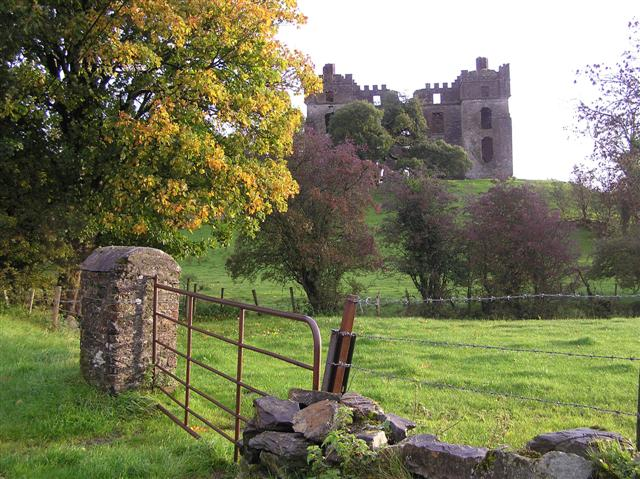
Raphoe Castle

In 1198, John de Courcy, a Norman knight who had invaded Ulster in 1177, returned to County Donegal to devastate Inishowen and on his way destroyed churches at Ardstraw, County Tyrone, and Raphoe.

The design of the modern town is traced to the Ulster Plantation of the early 17th century when the town was granted to English and Scottish settlers. It was these settlers who laid out the town with the 'Diamond' at its centre, in a similar manner to other Plantation towns like Derry and Donegal.

== Raphoe Castle ==
Built in the 1630s as the Bishop's Palace, the 'castle', which is now a ruin, was laid siege to during the Irish Rebellion of 1641, captured by Cromwell's troops in 1650 and was damaged by supporters of King James II & VII in 1689. Although still awaiting restoration, Raphoe Castle is probably the most impressive castle in Donegal. In 1633, John Leslie was translated from the Scottish See of the Isles to become the bishop of Raphoe. Marrying at the age of 67, and absorbing the Bishopric of Clogher at the age of 90, Leslie dominated the area until his death, aged 100, in 1671. Feeling threatened in his new location, he built himself a new palace on a hill overlooking the town using stone from an ancient Round Tower in 1637. This proved fortuitous when a rebellion broke out in 1641 and the Bishop was forced to shelter in the "castle", as it has come to be known until relieved by the Lagganeer army. Eight years later, Leslie, a Royalist was besieged by Cromwellian troops. This time, he was forced to surrender but unlike virtually every other bishop in Ireland, Leslie survived and was returned to his see at the Restoration in 1660. A leading figure in the Established Church, Bishop Leslie was no friend of either Catholic or Non-conformist. In 1664, he ordered four dissenting Presbyterian ministers to appear before his court, and when they failed to appear, had them arrested and imprisoned in Lifford gaol. A century later, in 1798, the castle was attacked again, this time by the United Irishmen, three of whom were killed. The castle was destroyed in an accidental fire in 1838

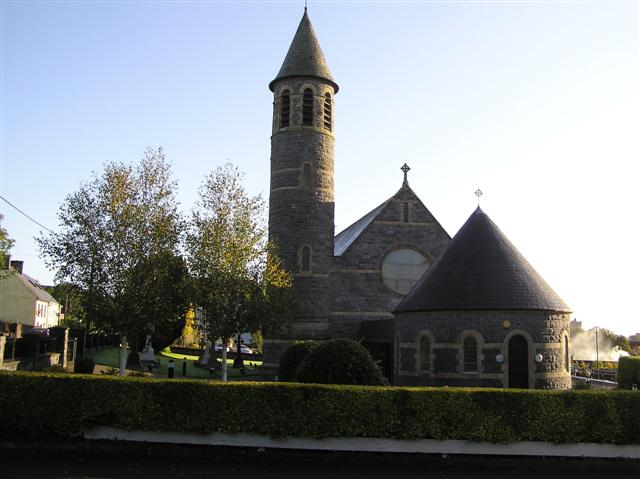
Raphoe Catholic Church, usually known locally as 'the Chapel'.

== Raphoe Cathedral ==
St. Columcille and St. Eunan, the ninth abbot of Iona, had churches at Raphoe in the fifth and sixth centuries. Several ninth-century blocks of stone can be found on the porch and the north wall of the present cathedral. The southeast corner dates from the twelfth century. The latest building dates from the 1730s. The communion plate is also noteworthy.

Notable bishops include Bishop George Montgomery, the first Protestant bishop, 1605 to 1610, a Scot, who was mainly involved in reclaiming church lands, and Bishop Andrew Knox, 1611 to 1633, who set about repairing and rebuilding the cathedral. A stone inscribed "And. Knox II. Epi. Cura", set in the porch, commemorates him. Bishop John Leslie had formerly been a soldier and had his own private army which he led into battle. Bishop Philip Twysden, 1747–1752, spent little time in Raphoe but squandered the family fortune in London; according to later reports, he was shot whilst robbing a stagecoach.

Sandy Montgomery, a kinsman of Bishop Montgomery, lies within the churchyard. His inscription reads, "Here lyeth the Body of Alexander Montgomery Esq., who departed this Life 29 September 1800, aged 78. He Represented this once Independent Country, 32 years".

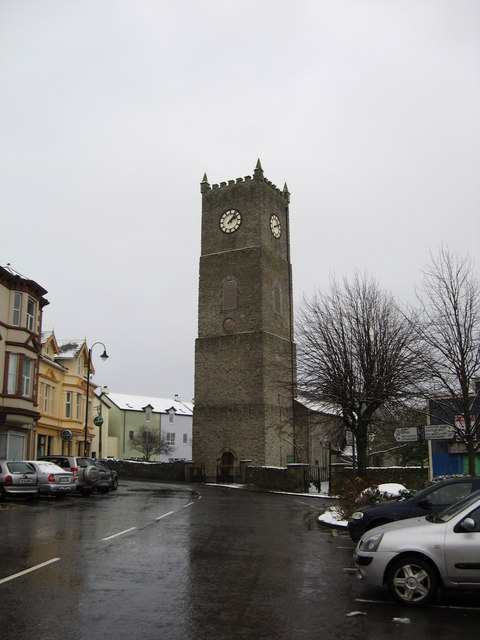
St Eunan's Church of Ireland Cathedral, Raphoe

== Beltany Stone Circle ==
On the summit of Beltany Hill, just over 1.5 kilometres (1 mi) from Raphoe, there stands one of the finest stone circles in Ireland. Reputedly older than Stonehenge, it consists of 64 standing stones out of an original 80. The stones range in height from 1.2–2.7 m (4–9 ft) while the diameter of the circle is 45 m (145 ft). Southeast of the circle is a standing stone two metres (6 1/2 ft) high. Beltony is a corruption of Baal tine, the fire of Baal; this suggests that the inhabitants of this area worshipped Baal, the sun god, and ruler of nature. Tradition tells us that the principal ceremonies were performed at the summer solstice; a sacred fire was lit in the centre of the circle of stones, which represented the stars and fire of the sun god Baal.

== Religion ==
The town lends its name to both the Roman Catholic and Church of Ireland dioceses, which cover nearly all except the very southern section of County Donegal including Inishowen as well as County Londonderry and the northern section of County Tyrone in Northern Ireland. Raphoe's status has declined significantly in recent centuries, however, with the Anglican diocese being merged with Derry, while the Roman Catholic bishop now has his see in the larger town of Letterkenny. The Church of Ireland Cathedral, built on the site of Columba's monastery, is named for St Eunan (as is the Roman Catholic Cathedral in Letterkenny). There is also a Presbyterian church and a Congregational Church in Raphoe.

== Transport ==
Raphoe railway station opened on 1 January 1909 and finally closed on 31 January 1959.

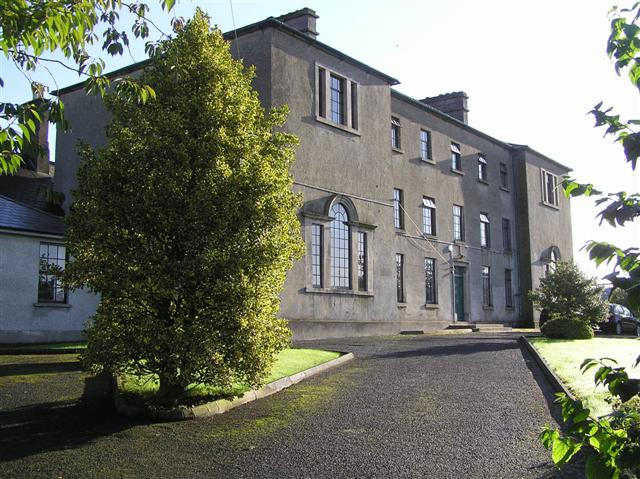
Royal School Boarding House, Raphoe.

The nearest railway station is operated by NI Railways and runs from Derry~Londonderry railway station via Coleraine to Belfast Lanyon Place and Belfast Grand Central. The strategically important Belfast-Derry railway line is to be upgraded to facilitate more frequent trains and improvements to the permanent way such as track and signalling to enable faster services.

== Education ==
Raphoe has two secondary schools and two primary schools. The Royal and Prior School is of the Protestant ethos and Deele College is non-denominational.

== Recent history ==
In recent years, Raphoe has come under the media spotlight following the establishment of the Morris Tribunal to investigate allegations of corrupt and dishonest policing in the county by the Garda Síochána. The Tribunal's second report related to Garda attempts to frame a local publican, Frankie McBrearty, for the murder of cattle dealer Richie Barron.

On 27 August 2005, the first main Royal Black Preceptory demonstration in Ireland was held in Raphoe, although local preceptories have been parading in the county for decades.

The businessman and television personality Sir Gerry Robinson lived in Raphoe. He was the former non-executive chairman of Allied Domecq and the ex-chairman/chief executive of Granada. He owned an estate on the outskirts of Raphoe named Oakfield Park (often known locally as Stoney's Estate), which contains a Georgian country house and a botanical garden with a 15 in (381 mm) gauge railway, the Difflin Lake Railway. The gardens and railway are open to the public.

== Notable people ==
- Sir James Hawkins-Whitshed, 1st Bt. (1762–1849) – Royal Navy officer; served in the American, French Revolutionary and Napoleonic Wars; Admiral of the Fleet
- Paul Hegarty (born 1967) – football manager Finn Harps
- Half Hung MacNaghten (1722–1761) – Ulster-Scots landowner, gambler and convicted murderer
- Chloe Magee (born 1988) – professional badminton player and Olympic competitor
- Frank McBrearty Jnr – politician; former county mayor of County Donegal
- Frank McBrearty Snr – businessman targeted by police misconduct
- Dr Ezekiel Nesbitt (1712–1798) – physician; president of the Royal College of Physicians of Ireland
- Concobhar Ó Duibheannaigh (1532–1612) – Roman Catholic bishop and martyr
- Sir Gerry Robinson (1948–2021) – businessman; former non-executive chairman of Allied Domecq and the ex-chairman/chief executive of Granada plc. Born in Dunfanaghy and raised in London, he lived at Oakfield Park, on the outskirts of Raphoe, in his later years.

== See also ==
- List of towns and villages in the Republic of Ireland
- Dunduff Castle, South Ayrshire
