= Lifford Bridge =

Bridge over the River Foyle

Coordinates: 54°49′52″N 7°28′49″W

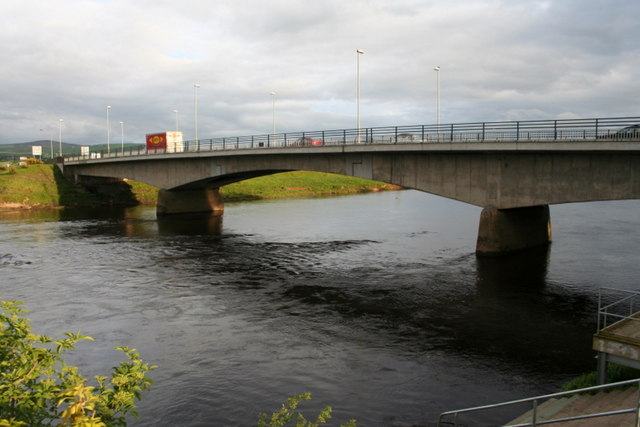
The Lifford Bridge.

Lifford Bridge (in Irish Droichead Leifear) is a cross-border bridge on the A38 connecting with the N15, spanning the River Foyle which marks the border between Strabane in County Tyrone, Northern Ireland, and Lifford in County Donegal in the Republic of Ireland. It remains a vital part of the trans-border route from the North, West and East of County Donegal, to Dublin via County Tyrone.

== History ==
Lifford came into the possession of Sir Richard Hansard during the Plantation of Ulster in 1607. One of the conditions of his grant was that a ferry crossing be provided over the River Finn. This service continued until 1730 when the first bridge linking Lifford and Strabane was built.

In the 19th century a curious custom existed when if, by the end of the Assizes in Lifford Courthouse or Omagh Courthouse, a jury could not reach a unanimous verdict in a case, they were sent to the "verge" of the county to be dismissed. In the case of counties Donegal and Tyrone, this was the middle of the Lifford Bridge.

The present bridge was constructed by engineering company Farrans in 1964, jointly funded by Donegal County Council and the old Tyrone County Council. Strabane District Council took over the functions of Tyrone County Council in part of West Tyrone in 1973. The overall length of the bridge is 115m. In 2005 it carried some 16,000 vehicles a day.

During The Troubles in 1968, an attempt was made to blow the bridge up. However, it was closed for only a short time.

In 2005 refurbishment of the bridge took place and included upgrading the parapet railings, installation of safety kerbing and railings, resurfacing of the carriageway deck and footways, upgrading streetlights. Over £400,000 was spent on the project.

Next bridge upstream	River Foyle	Next bridge downstream
Clady Bridge	Foyle Bridge	Craigavon Bridge
