= Letterkenny bus station =

Bus station in County Donegal, Ireland

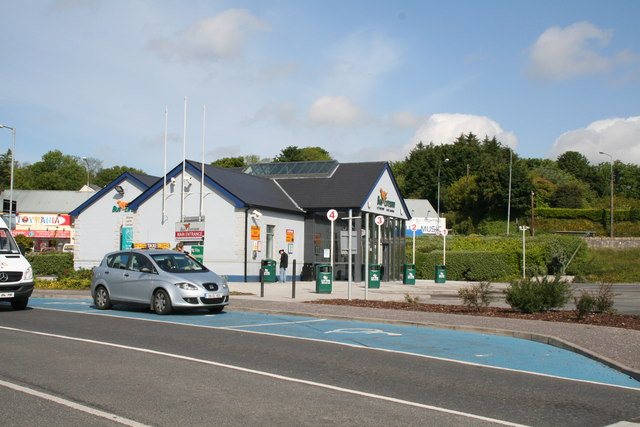

General information
- Location: Letterkenny; County Donegal; Ireland
- Coordinates: 54.9566°N 7.7203°W
- Bus operators: Bus Éireann, Lough Swilly Bus Company

Construction
- Structure type: Brick-and-glass structure
- Cycle facilities: Racks
- Accessible: Yes
Location
- Location within Ireland

Letterkenny bus station is a Bus Éireann station serving the County of Donegal in Ireland. It is located in the Cathedral Town of Letterkenny. It is a particularly important transport hub in the county, as there are no rail services in the area.

== Services ==
It serves as the bus terminus on Route 32 from Dublin's Busáras, via Dublin Airport and Monaghan bus station. Letterkenny is serviced by eleven daily buses each way on this route (including public holidays).

It also serves as the final stop in the Republic on Route 64 from Galway via Sligo, though the bus service continues from there in a north-easterly direction before turning south-eastwards towards Killea and eventually crossing the border into Northern Ireland. This service is more varied; five daily buses to Galway, as well as an additional bus service that operates each day except for Sundays and public holidays, and three daily buses from Galway, as well as additional services that operate each day except for Sundays and public holidays and that operate on Fridays, Sundays and public holidays only.

Local services provided here include Route 487 covering Raphoe, Lifford and also Strabane across the Irish border; Route 489 covering Carrigans, St Johnston, Porthall, Lifford and Strabane; and Route 491 covering Raphoe, Convoy, Stranorlar and terminating outside the McElhinney's department store in Ballybofey.

== Station layout and building ==
The station is situated between central Letterkenny and the local polytechnic institute. The bus bays are located outside the station building and are not sheltered from the elements. Short-term parking spaces are located close to the station building, though vehicles do not have access to the area where buses load their cargo. Taxis are located a short distance away (close to the easily visible sign for Michael Murphy Sports and Leisure), though can be called across by telephone if necessary.

The station building, designed by architectural firm Quinn Architects, houses ticket counters, ticket machines, noticeboards, and waiting areas (both standing and seated) in addition to passenger amenities, such as restrooms, lighting and radiators. There are several short-term bicycle racks located at the side of the station.

The station building has also been used a venue during the annual Culture Night.

== History ==
The current bus station building was originally the Letterkenny railway station for the County Donegal Railways. It was adjacent to the Letterkenny railway station for the Londonderry and Lough Swilly Railway; however, this was demolished after the railway line closed down and has been replaced by road leading into a shopping centre, as well as parking spaces serving the present bus station. The goods shed and a goods crane still remain nearby. The goods shed near the station has been converted into a café, while the crane has become overgrown.

In 1996, Minister for Transport, Energy and Communications Michael Lowry announced he had acquired EU funding under the Interreg programme for several Bus Éireann stations, including the one in Letterkenny, with the station set to get a passenger waiting area, toilets for the handicapped and facilities for crews, vehicle storage and shelters among other things.
