= A40 road (Northern Ireland) =

Road in Northern Ireland

A40

Major junctions
- Start end: Derry
- Finish end: Raphoe

Location
- Country: United Kingdom
- Constituent country: Northern Ireland
- Primary destinations: Newtown Cunningham; Carrigans; St Johnston; Stranorlar

Road network
- Roads in Northern Ireland; Motorways; A roads in Northern Ireland

The A40 links Derry in the North West of Northern Ireland to Raphoe in County Donegal.

== Craigavon Bridge ==
The A40 commences in the city centre of Derry on the west bank of the River Foyle and is connected with A2 at the Foyleside Roundabout. The A2 continues at a higher elevation along John Street running parallel to the A40 along Foyle Road and travelling under the Craigavon Bridge, whilst the A2 spans the bridge over the Foyle on the higher level to the east bank to the Waterside and Derry~Londonderry railway station and around the Ulster coast line. The lower deck of the Craigavon Bridge has connections with the A5 along Victoria Road on the east bank to Strabane and Omagh. The two decks of the double deck Craigavon Bridge are both called Bridge Street, and the lower deck did have railway track linking the lines that served the city for goods trains. The Craigavon Bridge is an underbridge in terms of the A40, and an overbridge in terms of the A2.

== City to County ==
The A40 then continues with the Foyle Valley Railway on the left and the narrow gauge railway track slowly diverging following the gentle meanders of River Foyle. Housing mainly on the right after a mini roundabout becoming the Letterkenny Road gaining a higher alignment with the countryside and railway line along the tree lined shore in the valley. Over the Foyle is the A5 whilst the A40 moves west inland into farmland and diverges from the Letterkenny Road B193 at Nixons Corner. The B193 to Newtown Cunningham and the A40 turns southwestward along Mullenan Road and crosses from Northern Ireland into County Donegal and then becoming the R236 and running via Carrigans and at Dundee the R265 designation brings the road to St Johnston until Tullyowen before reverting to the R236 linking with Raphoe.
