= R265 road (Ireland) =

Road in County Donegal, Ireland

R265 road
- Bóthar R265
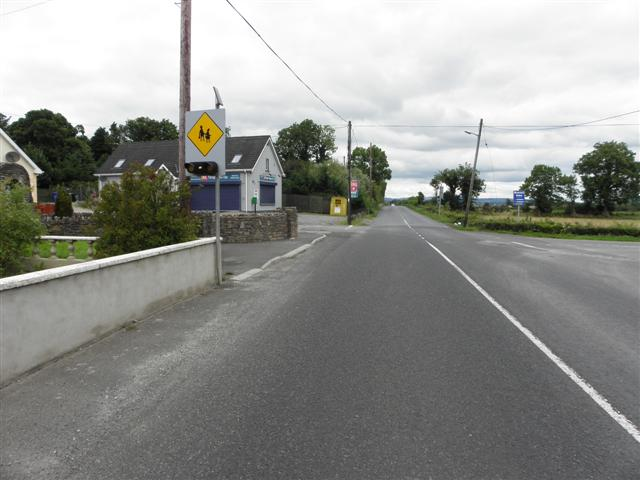
- R265 at Porthall, County Donegal

Location
- Country: Ireland
- Counties: County Donegal

Highway system
- Roads in Ireland; Motorways; Primary; Secondary; Regional
← R264	→ R266

The R265 is a regional road in County Donegal, Ireland. It runs north to south from near Newtown Cunningham to Rossgier near Lifford. The road runs from near Lough Swilly and generally along the west bank of the River Foyle. The road runs through mostly arable farmland in the East Donegal area.

== Trajectory ==
The R265 runs from a junction of the R237 Newtown Cunningham to Killea road. Running South through Tirroddy, Glebe and Coxtown before joining the R236 in Dundee outside St Johnston. The R236/R265 travels through St Johnston for approximately one mile and then the R265 diverges at Tullyowen from the R236 which continues south-west to Raphoe. The R265 then continues southwards through Cuttymanhill, Carrickmore, and Porthall. It then continues through Gortgranagh near the River Foyle an runs through Sixty Acres, Blackrock, Coolatee, Edenmore before joining the N14 in Rossgier. The N14 links Letterkenny to Lifford.
