= Letterkenny railway station (County Donegal Railways) =

Railway station in Ireland

Letterkenny (CDRJC)
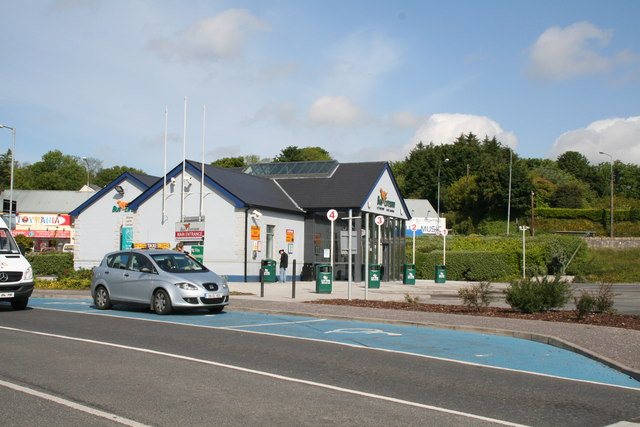
- The current site of Letterkenny station, which is now the bus station.

General information
- Location: Letterkenny, County Donegal; Ireland
- Coordinates: 54.953697°N 7.728593°W
- Platforms: 2
- Tracks: 2

Construction
- Architect: Courtney & Co. Robert McAlpine & Sons

History
- Opened: 1 January 1909
- Closed: 1 January 1960
- Original company: Strabane and Letterkenny Railway
Location

Letterkenny (CDR) railway station served the town of Letterkenny in County Donegal, Ireland.

== History ==
The station opened on 1 January 1909 when the County Donegal Railways Joint Committee built the Strabane and Letterkenny Railway from Strabane to Letterkenny.

The station was built adjacent to the existing Letterkenny (LLS) railway station operated by the Londonderry and Lough Swilly Railway and had a siding connection to the system of this company.

The station had non-passenger facilities as freight was an important part of the business rationale for the railway's construction. There was a goods store, a crane, cattle pens, signal box, water tank, turntable and an engine shed.

The last train arrived on 31 December 1959. It closed on 1 January 1960. CDRJC road services continued to use the station until they were taken over by CIÉ on 10 July 1971. The station building is now used by Bus Éireann as the Letterkenny bus station.

== Routes ==
Preceding station	Disused railways	Following station
Glenmaquin	Strabane and Letterkenny Railway	Terminus
