= Porthall =

Village in County Donegal, Ireland

Porthall Halla an Phoirt
- Village
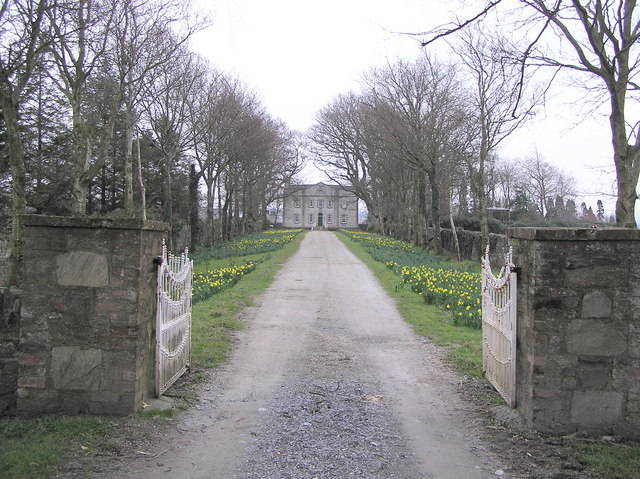
- Port Hall, the country house that gave its name to the village of Porthall.

- Location in Ireland
- Coordinates: 54°52′20″N 7°27′55″W
- Country: Ireland
- Province: Ulster
- County: County Donegal

Government
  - Dáil Éireann: Donegal

Population (2011)
  - Total: 253
- Time zone: UTC+0 (WET)
  - Summer (DST): UTC-1 (IST (WEST))

Porthall (Irish: Halla an Phoirt) is a village and townland in County Donegal, Ireland. The village is located on the west bank of the River Foyle, in The Laggan district of East Donegal, on the R265 road. The nearest town is Lifford, the county town.

== History ==
=== Battle of Binnion Hill ===
The Battle of Binnion Hill was fought in 1557 just a short distance from Porthall, approx. 2.5 miles (4 kilometres) North West. The battle came about when John O’Neill, the Grandson of Con O’Neill assembled an army to attack Tirconnell, modern day County Donegal. O’Neill's plan was to defeat Manus O'Donnell from the Kinel-Connell and thus be the only King in Ulster. On the O’Neills side were people from Oriel, modern day Counties Armagh, Louth and Monaghan and from Dundalk, County Louth, also part of O’Neill's army was Hugh O’Donnell (brother of Calvagh) and his followers.

The Kinel-Connell was in turmoil at this time as Calvagh O'Donnell had his father locked up for two years so that he himself could be ruler of the O’Donnells and O’Donnell lands. Calvagh, unsure of what to do in the event of an attack from the O’Neills consulted with his father who advised not to attack the O’Neills but to wait until they crossed the river and then to attack their camp at Carraig Laith (Carrickalee, Strabane, County Tyrone). Carraig Laith is close to where the two rivers meet to create the River Foyle.

O’Neill and his army left their camp in Tyrone, crossing the River Finn and marched towards Raphoe then along the Laggan to a place called Baile-aighidh-chaoin, where they set up a new camp. This is now known as Balleeghan townland, close to the banks of Lough Swilly in Raymoghy Parish. Calvagh was at a meeting on the summit of Bennin (Binnion). Others with Calvagh were his son Con and Walter McSweeney who had brought two companies of gallowglasses of the McSweeneys of Fanad. Also there was Donnell Gorm McSweeney and his followers who were the descendants of Donnell.

Two members of Calvagh's party were sent to spy on the O’Neill camp and report back to Calvagh at Binnion. On hearing the testimony of the spying mission Calvagh decide to attack John O’Neill and his forces at his camp immediately. The troops of Calvagh numbering two battalions marched on the O’Neill camp and began killing and slaughtering all before them. John O’Neill on hearing the commotion in his camp realised that he was under attack and fearing for his life slipped out of the back of his tent.

Two other people escaped with O’Neill that night, Hugh O’Donnell (son of Manus) and Donough O’Gallagher (son of Felim Finn). The three men in their retreat back into Tyrone had to cross the River Deele, River Finn and the River Derg by swimming across them and as it had been raining heavily that night the rivers were very swollen, making it even more dangerous. On reaching Tearmonn-Ui-Moain, he bought a horse and made his way to Aireagal-da-Chiarog by morning.

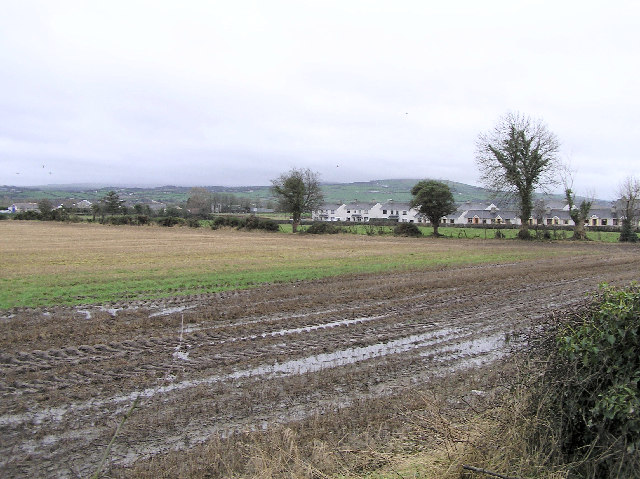
Porthall on a wet day, January 2006

Meanwhile, back at the battle site Calvagh and his men were in high spirits and enjoying the spoils of war. In the morning when the booty was being divided up Con (son of Calvagh) got as his portion eighty horses, the prize of all the horses was Shane O'Neill’s (son of John) own horse called ‘The Son of the Eagle’. It is said that the spoils from the battle were the most from any battle between the O’Neills and O’Donnells.

== Historical buildings ==
Port Hall, after which the village is named, is located on the west bank of the River Foyle. Built in the mid 18th century in the Georgian style, it was once owned by Tony Marreco. Mr Marreco was Junior Counsel at the Nuremberg Trials just after the Second World War. He later became a founding director of Amnesty International. Port Hall is now a stud farm situated on the northern end of the village.

Long Vale House (previously known as Clonfade), parts of which were built in 1611, is one of the oldest houses in County Donegal. It was built by a Thomas Keyes who served under Sir Richard Hansard, and when Hansard was appointed Governor of Lifford, Thomas Keyes received from him a plot of land on which to build a house. This land was Clonfade. Thomas Keyes was High Sheriff of Londonderry City in 1623 and owner of the estate of Clonfade, after which the house is named. It is now known as The Hall Green. The house is located on the outskirts of the village on the R265 road to Lifford.

Mongevlin Castle (also known as Mongavlin Castle) is a ruined castle which lies on the west bank of the River Foyle, approx 4 km north of Porthall.

In the sixteenth century Mongevlin was the chief residence of Ineen Dubh, she was the daughter of MacDonnell, Lord of the Isles and mother of Red Hugh O'Donnell. The State Paper recording her possession of the castle: "From Cul-Mac-Tryan runs a bogg three myles in length to the side of Lough Foyle in the midst of the bog is a standing loughe called Bunaber here at Bunaber dwells O'Donnell's mother (Ineen Dubh M'Donnell). Three miles above Cargan stands a fort called McGevyvelin (Mongivlin) upon the river of Lough Foyle O'Donnell's mother's chief house". The castle was recorded by Captain Nicholas Pynnar in his Survey of the Escheated Counties of Ulster in 1619 where he wrote that Sir John Stewart had built a very strong castle at ‘Magerlin’ with a flanker at each corner. There had been a flag stone over the archway with the inscription 'J.S.-E.S.T.-1619' which went missing in the early eighteenth century. Though the account that the castle had been completed in 1619 is contradicted by a later Survey (in 1622) of the Escheated Counties of Ulster that reads; Sir John Stuart, assignee of the Duke of Lennox ‘has built a castle of lime and stone on the banks of the River Foyle 50’ x 25’ x 3½ stories, slated, with 4 flankers at the top thereof. And an iron door portcullis wise; the principal timber and joists of the floor being oak are laid but not boarded or the partitions made, the iron grates for the windows being within the castle ready to be set up’. There is a wonderful pencil drawing showing the castle at that time available here.

King James visited here on his way to the siege of Derry in 1689. From here he sent a letter proposing surrender, it was rejected.

The castle later became the property of The Hon. Elizabeth Hamilton whose eldest son, James, Earl of Abercorn, and Viscount Strabane erected a plaque in her memory in 1704.

The castle is now in ruins with only a small proportion of it left standing.

== Porthall railway station ==
Porthall railway station opened on 1 May 1848 and was part of the Great Northern Railway of Ireland system which ran from Belfast Great Victoria Street to Foyle Road railway station in Derry City via Portadown, Dungannon, Omagh, Victoria Bridge, Strabane, Porthall and St Johnston. Goods trains stopped running via the station on 4 January 1965 with the line and station finally closing on 15 February 1965.

The nearest station is located in Derry in the Waterside at Derry~Londonderry railway station with trains provided by NI Railways. Trains to and from Derry~Londonderry railway station run via the coast to Coleraine and Ballymena and Antrim en route to Belfast Grand Central Station.

== Demographics ==
The population of Porthall at the 2011 census of Ireland was 253, and of this 130 were males and 123 were females.

== Education ==
Scoil Bhríde, Boyagh National School, was first called Porthall National School and was opened in 1836 by way of a free lease granted in 1825 by a local landlord called Mr. Dougherty from Redcastle and the local Land agent Mr. Clarke. The first teacher at the school was Patrick Conway who earned £4, 0s, ½p per year. Trustees of the school were Mr. C.B. Hamilton and Mr. John McColgan. In 1886 the school was renamed Boyagh National School. The school was taken over by the Irish Department of Education in 1934. Today Scoil Bhríde consists of two multi-grade classrooms. In 2011 the school attendance was thirty-five pupils. Various subjects taught in the school include Irish, English, Maths and Drama. The school is a mainstream primary school under the patronage of the Catholic Bishop of Derry.

== Notable people ==
- Anthony Marreco, founding director of Amnesty International and Junior Counsel at the Nuremberg Trials at the end of World War II.

== See also ==
- List of towns and villages in the Republic of Ireland
