= R260 road (Ireland) =

Road in Ireland

Coordinates: 54.984697°N 8.434752°W

R260 road
- Bóthar R260
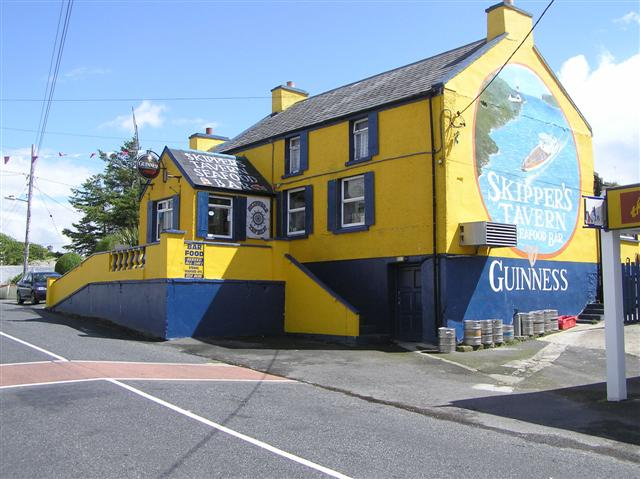
- R260 passing Skipper's Tavern, Burtonport

Route information
- Length: 0.9 km (0.56 mi; 3,000 ft)

Major junctions
- From: Burtonport Quay
- To: R259 Ailt a' Chorráin (Burtonport)

Location
- Country: Ireland

Highway system
- Roads in Ireland; Motorways; Primary; Secondary; Regional

The R260 road is a 1km long regional road in Ireland, located in Ailt a' Chorráin, County Donegal. It runs from Burtonport crossroads to Burtonport Harbour.
