= R236 road (Ireland) =

Road in Ireland

R236 road
- Bóthar R236
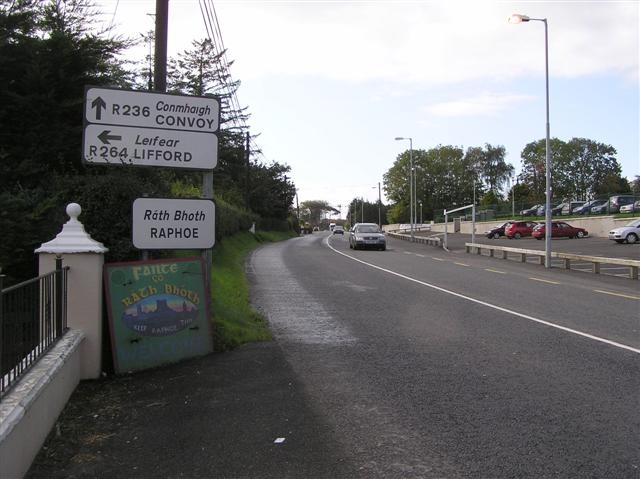
- Derry Road, Raphoe, on the R236

Location
- Country: Ireland

Highway system
- Roads in Ireland; Motorways; Primary; Secondary; Regional

The R236 road runs in County Donegal in Ulster, and links Stranorlar, via Convoy and Raphoe, to St Johnston and Carrigans, becoming the A40 into Derry in Northern Ireland.

The R236 road is a regional road in the Republic of Ireland, running from the N13 straight off the road from Stranorlar in Kilross, whilst the rest of the N13 continues from the T junction to Letterkenny. The R236 then runs through farmland via the townland of Killynure, crosses Glasly Bridge, which takes it across the Burn Dale, and continues on via Convoy and Raphoe. The stretch of the R236 between the Kilross Junction and Convoy is known locally as 'the Braaid Rayid' or 'the Braaid Roád', both Ulster-Scots terms meaning 'the Broad Road'.

The R236 joins the N14 at a T junction for a short length running north from the Lifford and Strabane direction to Letterkenny, before another T junction leaving the main N14 and running via Carrickdawson, Momeen, Magheraghcloy, Castletown. In Tullyowen the R265 (linking southwards to Rossgeir near Lifford) and that road number is in St Johnston before the northward parting of the ways in Dundee with the northwestward R265 running to Newtown Cunningham and the N13 at Castleforward Demesne, whilst the R236 runs northeastward. The R236 runs via Carrigans before becoming the A40 when the border with County Londonderry is reached with the road linking Derry.

== See also ==
- Roads in Ireland
- National primary road
- National secondary road
