= R259 road (Ireland) =

Road in Ireland

Coordinates: 55.018276°N 8.331081°W

R259 road
- Bóthar R259
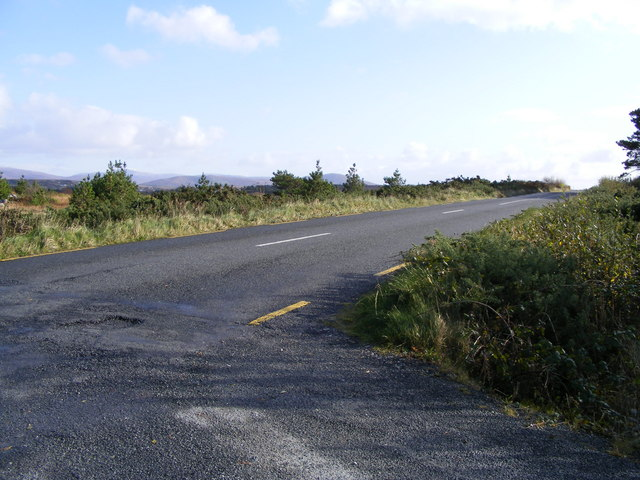
- Glashbeggan: looking southeast along the R259

Route information
- Length: 24.3 km (15.1 mi)

Major junctions
- From: N56 Crolly
- R266 Meenderryowan; R260 Burtonport
- To: N56 Dungloe

Location
- Country: Ireland

Highway system
- Roads in Ireland; Motorways; Primary; Secondary; Regional

The R259 road is a regional road in Ireland, located in County Donegal. It is a scenic route around the coast of The Rosses, which connects with N56 at both ends.

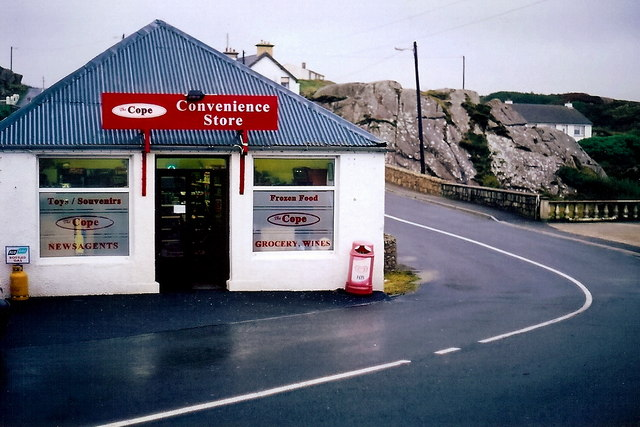
R259 in Kincasslagh village as it turns south towards Dungloe

The road runs east from Crolly to Kincasslagh, where it turns south to Dungloe, becoming the lower half of Dungloe Main Street before again connecting with N56 on Carnmore Road.

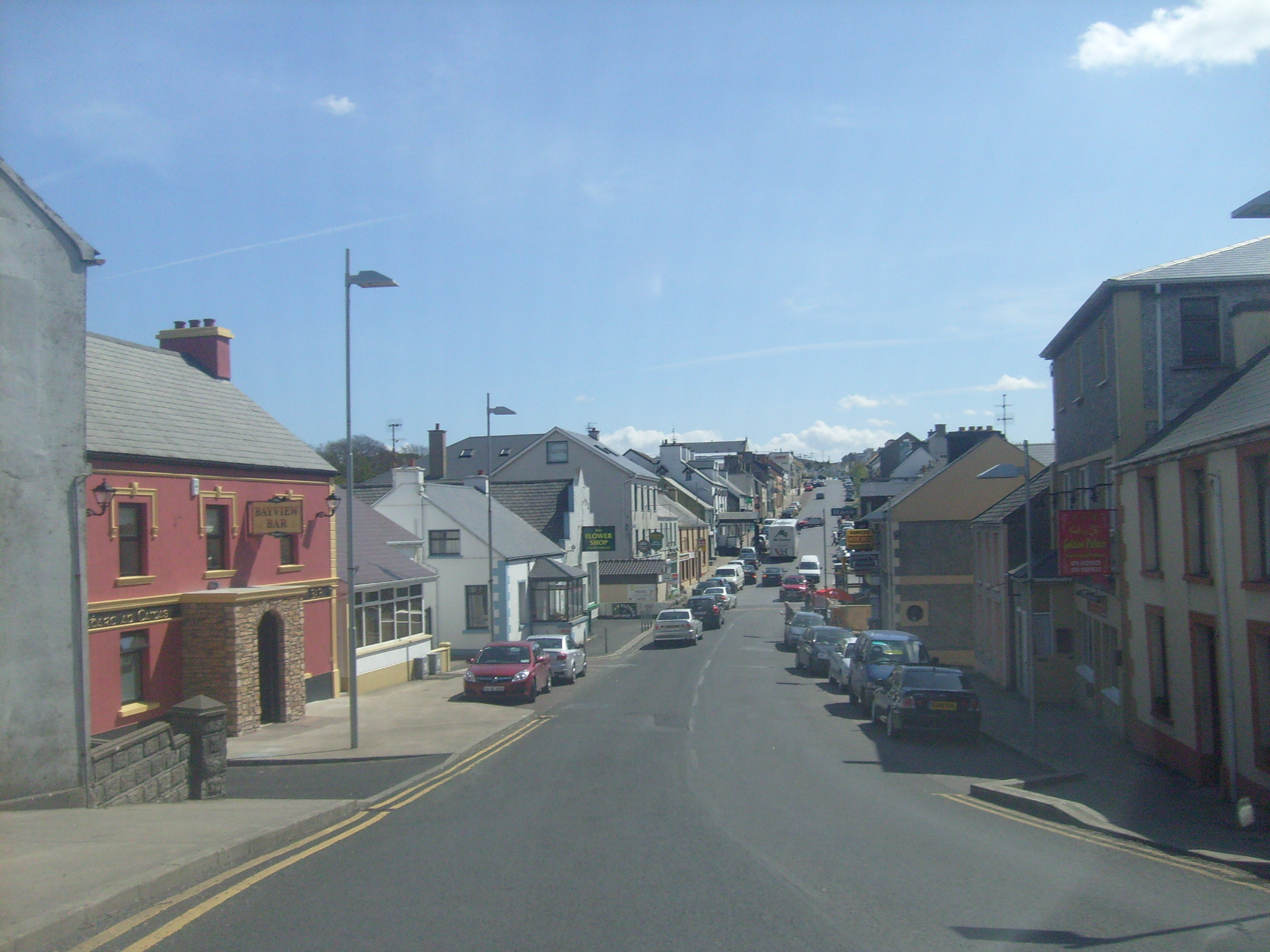
R259 at its southern end where it multiplexes with Dungloe Main Street

The road forms part of the Wild Atlantic Way.
