= Killea, County Donegal =

Village in County Donegal, Ireland

Killea Cill Fhéich
- Village
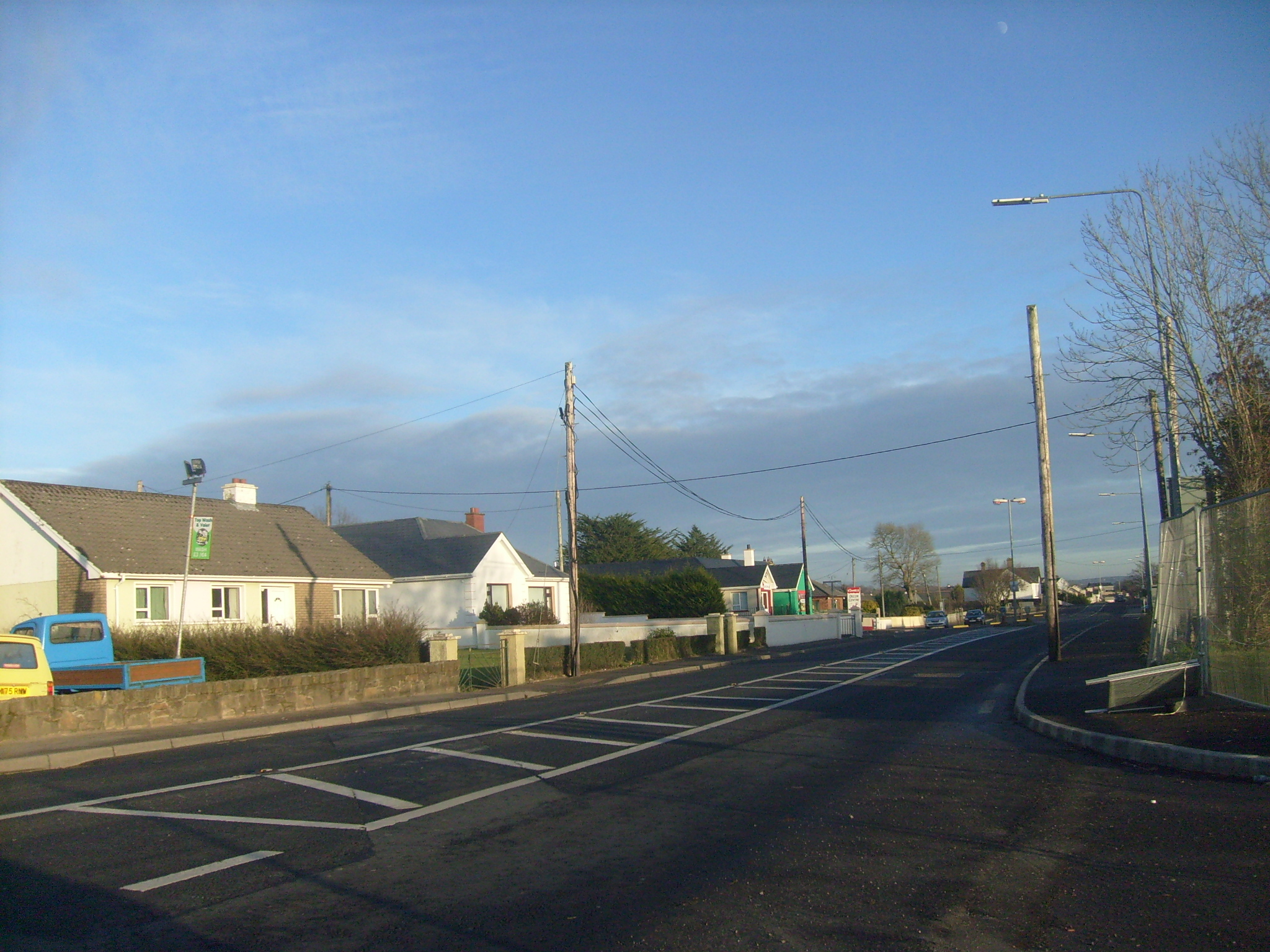

- Location in Ireland
- Coordinates: 54°58′38″N 7°24′01″W
- Country: Republic of Ireland and Northern Ireland
- Province: Ulster
- County: County Donegal, County Londonderry

Government
  - Dáil Éireann: Donegal

Population (2011)
  - Urban: 581
- Time zone: UTC+0 (WET)
  - Summer (DST): UTC-1 (IST (WEST))

Killea (Irish: Cill Fhéich, meaning 'Fiach's church') is a village and civil parish on the border of County Donegal, Ireland, and County Londonderry in Northern Ireland.

== History ==
Killea was one of several Protestant villages in eastern Donegal that would have been transferred to Northern Ireland, had the recommendations of the Irish Boundary Commission been enacted in 1925.

This border village once had a customs post on the main B193/R237 Letterkenny Road.

In recent years, many new homes have been built in the area and the village now acts largely as a commuter village for Derry.. Some of the housing in Killea village is on the County Londonderry side of the border.

== Celtic cross ==
The Emmery Celtic Cross is located in the area. It is named after its creator, forester Liam Emmery, who planted a Celtic cross design in the woods near Killea. He used two different types of trees create the effect. Emmery died in 2016 and, a few years after his death, the cross became visible from the sky. It was first spotted by passengers flying into the City of Derry Airport. The cross measures more than 100 meters in length and 70 meters wide.

== Transport ==
Killea is on the main road between Derry and Letterkenny. Bus Eireann run a regular bus service, Expressway Route 64, that connects the village with Derry and Letterkenny.

== Notable residents ==
- Kevin McHugh - a footballer who played in the League of Ireland with Finn Harps and Derry City

== See also ==
- List of populated places in Ireland
