= R266 road (Ireland) =

Road in Ireland

Coordinates: 55.031376°N 8.338456°W

R266 road
- Bóthar R266
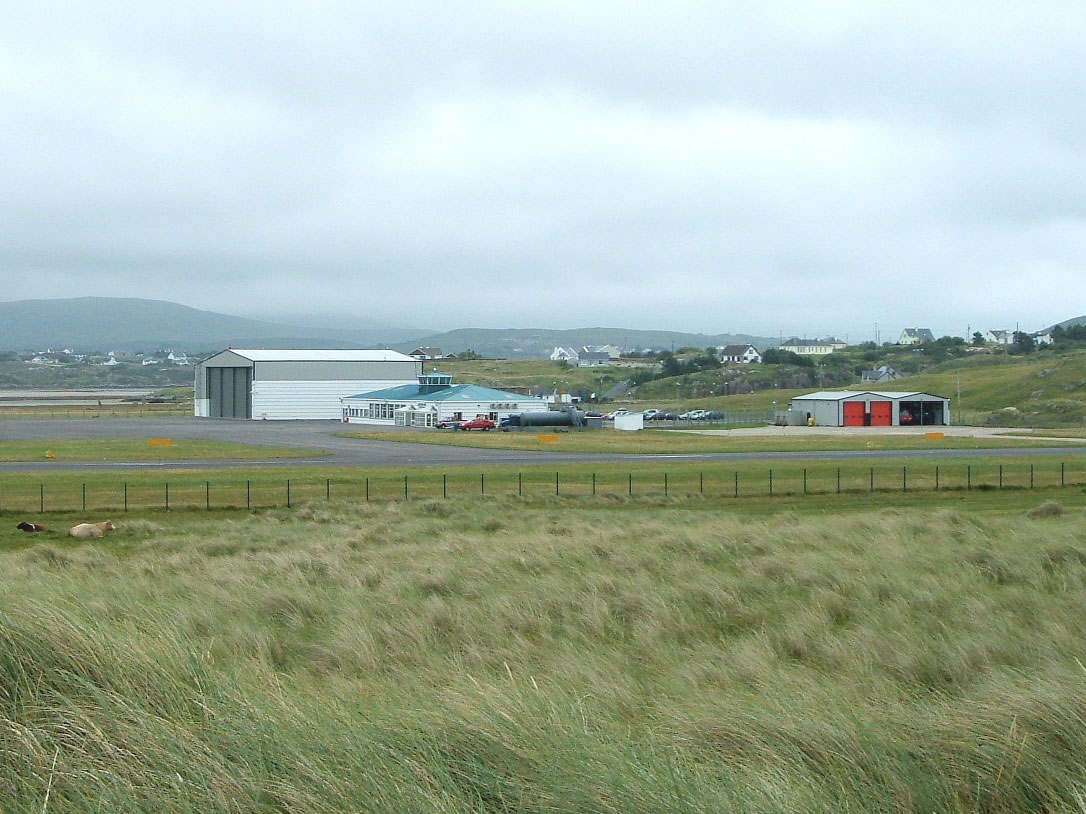
- Donegal Airport, at the northern end of the R266

Route information
- Length: 1.4 km (0.87 mi)

Major junctions
- From: Donegal Airport
- To: R259 Meenderryowan

Location
- Country: Ireland

Highway system
- Roads in Ireland; Motorways; Primary; Secondary; Regional

The R266 road is a short regional road in Ireland, located in County Donegal.
