= Bus Éireann =

Bus and coach operator in Ireland

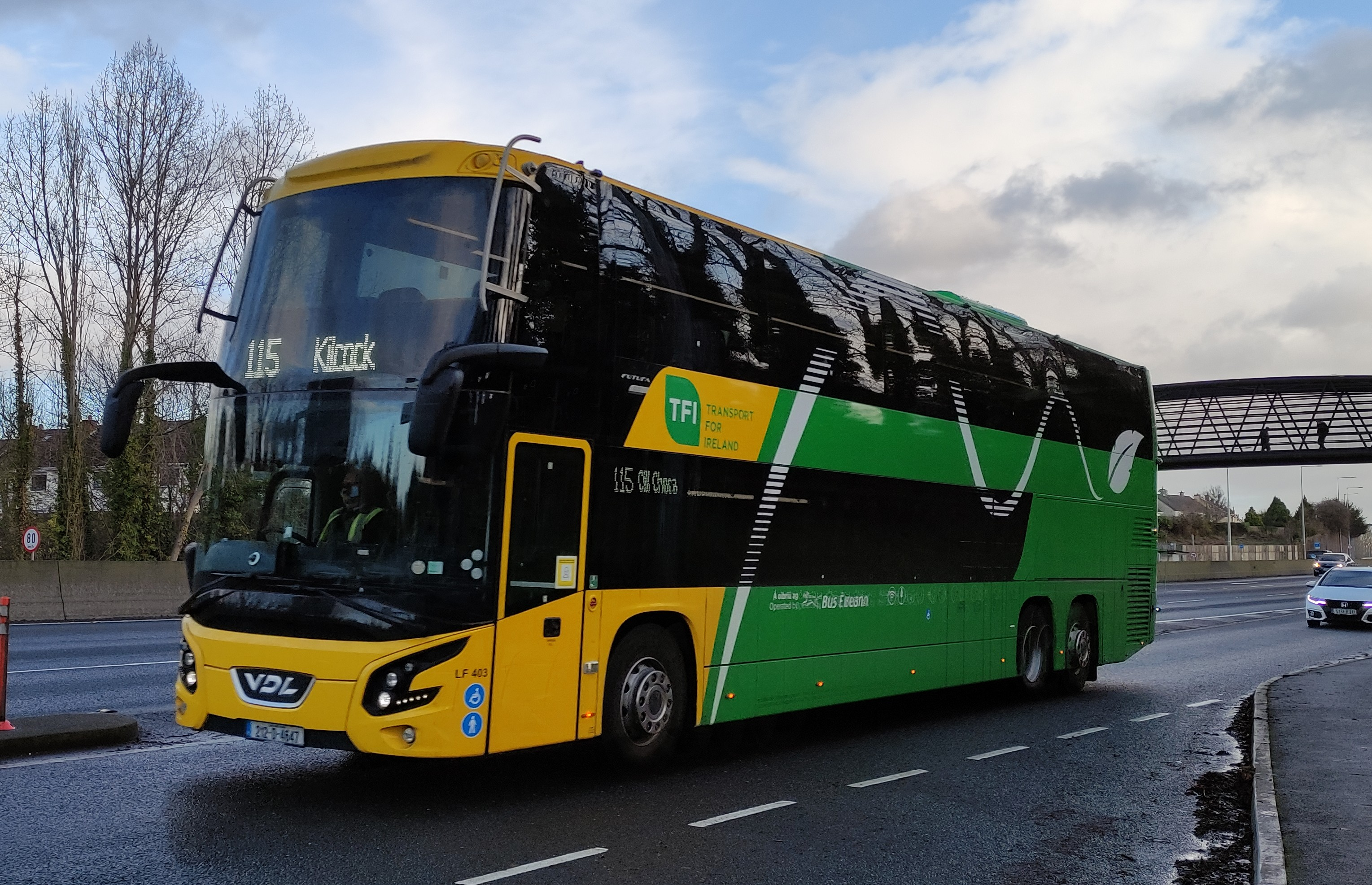
- Bus Éireann VDL Futura Double Decker working a 115 Service from Dublin Connolly to Kilcock
- Parent: Córas Iompair Éireann
- Founded: 2 February 1987; 39 years ago
- Headquarters: Broadstone, Dublin
- Service area: Ireland
- Service type: Bus & coach services
- Alliance: Ulsterbus
- Fleet: 1,200 (January 2018)
- Fuel type: Diesel; NGV (Trial)
- Chief executive: Jean O'Sullivan
- Website: BusÉireann.ie Expressway

Bus Éireann (Irish pronunciation: [ˌbˠɔsˠ ˈeːɾʲən̪ˠ]; "Irish Bus") is a state-owned bus and coach operator providing services throughout Ireland, with the exception of Dublin, where bus services are provided by sister company Dublin Bus. It is a subsidiary of Córas Iompair Éireann (CIÉ). The company's primary hub is Busáras, located in Store Street, Dublin. In 2022 it operated 229 Public Service Obligation Routes, 14 expressway routes and 8940 school transport routes.

== History ==
Bus Éireann Logo 1987–2000

Bus Éireann Logo 2000–2007

Bus Éireann was established in February 1987 when it was split out from Córas Iompair Éireann (CIÉ). The logo of Bus Éireann incorporates a red Irish Setter, a breed of dog that originated in Ireland.

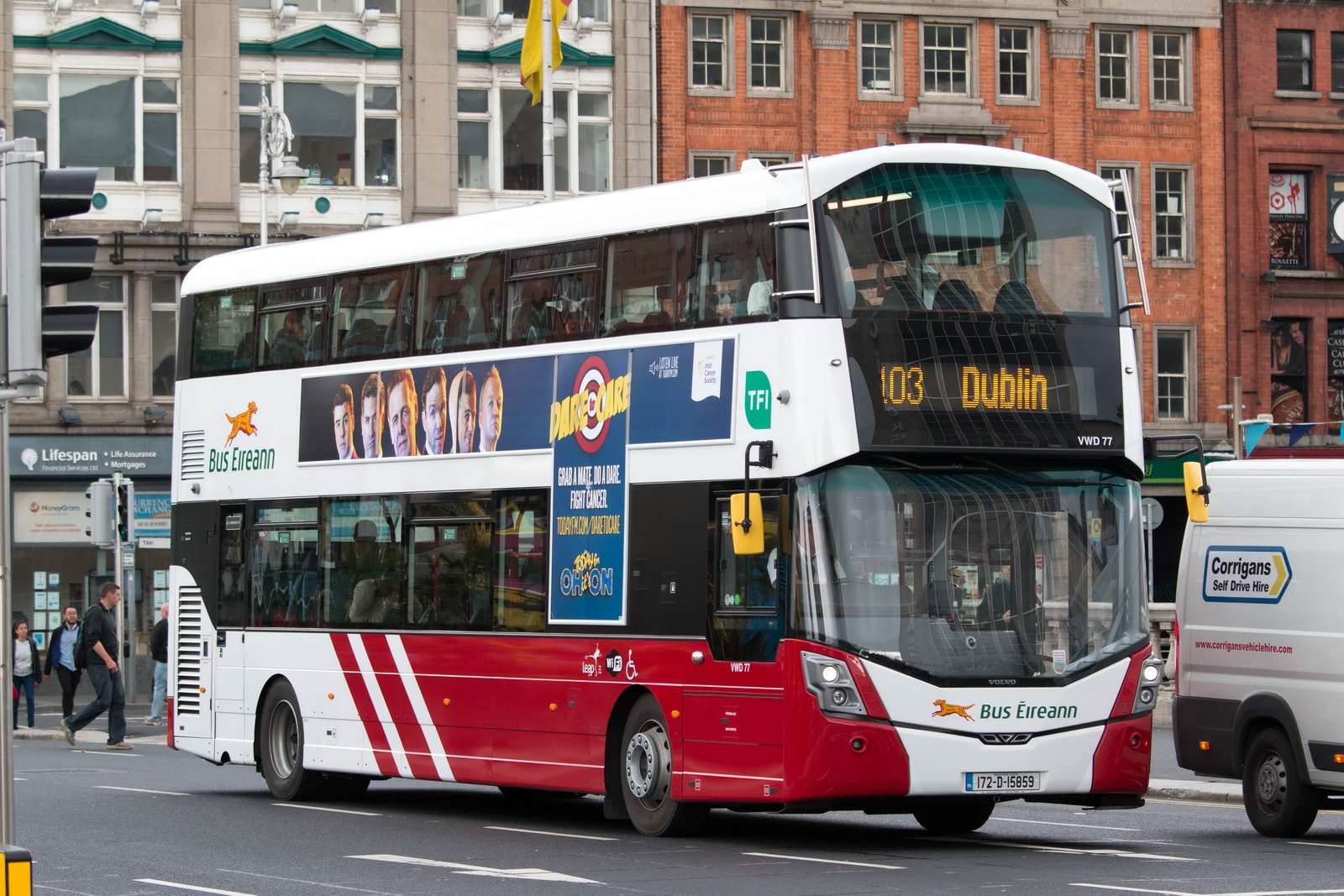
A Bus Éireann Wright Gemini 3 operating service 103 in Dublin, September 2017

The National Development Plan 1999-2006 included a large expansion in commuter services, especially in the Greater Dublin Area, and so the company greatly increased services on routes such as Dublin/Drogheda/Dundalk, Dublin/Ashbourne, Dublin/Ratoath, Dublin/Dunshaughlin/Navan/Kells/Cavan.

In 2008 Bus Éireann stated that they also intended to develop similar services to the 24-hour Dublin-Belfast route on the following routes: Donegal-Dublin, Ballina-Dublin, Sligo-Dublin and Drogheda-Balbriggan-Dublin Airport-Dublin. Due to the post-2008 economic downturn in Ireland these plans were never realised. On 20 January 2009, Bus Éireann announced that it was to let 320 staff go and withdraw 150 buses due to the economic crisis. Some services were permanently withdrawn or reduced due to the cutbacks.

During 2016, it was reported that Bus Éireann amassed losses of around €6 million and that these losses were set to rise throughout 2017. As a result, Shane Ross, TD, Ireland's Minister for Transport, Tourism and Sport, mentioned the company "faces insolvency within 18 months". Bus Éireann concluded an all out strike on Thursday 13 April that lasted since Friday 24 March 2017.

In November 2020 Bus Éireann suspended its Dublin to Belfast service, route X1, along with its Expressway services linking Dublin to Cork (route X8), Galway (routes 20 and X20) and Limerick (route X12). The board of the company announced it had taken the decision to end these commercial services, as they were losing money, in order to protect core routes. The financial impact of the COVID-19 pandemic was also cited as a reason for the suspension. Galway-Roscommon TD Claire Kerrane criticised the decision, highlighting the negative impact it would have on passengers who had relied on it in Aughrim, Ballinasloe and Athlone at a time when people were being encouraged to move back to such towns from the cities.

During the COVID-19 pandemic of 2020-2022 it was noted that Bus Éireann had been the only bus company to continue operating long-distance routes in the country. Speaking to the BBC, the general secretary of the National Bus and Rail Union (NBRU) Dermot O'Leary noted that as the majority of the Irish population stayed at home, the market for commercial companies to make profits on their normal routes ceased overnight, and they subsequently paused operations. As a result, "essential workers [reliant on public transport] could not have gone into hospitals, doctor's surgeries, pharmacies" were it not for Bus Éireann. Bus Éireann also provided the only bus connection between Athlone and the cities of Galway and Dublin for a period in 2020 when private companies such as Citylink temporarily suspended services.

From 2021 Bus Éireann services were expanded as part of a general expansion of services of bus services in Ireland. In rural areas this is taking place under the Connecting Ireland programme. Connecting Ireland includes the expansion of LocalLink and Bus Éireann services, as well as a reorganisation of services nationally. In 2022 this included improvements to 20 bus routes under the purview of Bus Éireann. Services in urban areas have also been expanded, with the launch of new town bus services, such as Carlow's, in July 2023.

== Services ==
Bus Éireann's main services are in Ireland but they also provide services to Northern Ireland in association with Ulsterbus including: expressway (intercity), commuter, local and school services. Additional services within Ireland include city services in Cork, Galway, Limerick and Waterford and town services in Athlone, Balbriggan, Drogheda, Dundalk, Navan, Carlow and Sligo.

Bus Éireann operates international services to Great Britain and mainland Europe, via the ports at Dublin and Rosslare Europort. Cities served include London, Birmingham, Manchester, Liverpool and Leeds. These are operated under the Eurolines brand.

When the company was first established in February 1987, there were no bus services between Dublin and Belfast. The Dublin/Dublin Airport/Newry/Belfast route was initiated soon after and came to be jointly operated by Bus Éireann and Ulsterbus. Reasons for the route's expansion in the 1990s and 2000s included the economic boom in the Republic, known as the Celtic Tiger; the Northern Ireland peace process which helped boost the economy there, and the rise of the low-cost airline industry, which greatly increased the numbers of people flying in and out of Dublin Airport from both sides of the border. By the 2000s the route operated an hourly service, each way, from 06:00 to 21:00 daily. In October 2006, further services were introduced on the route, departing at 01:00, 03:00, 05:00, and 23:00, thus establishing the route as the first "24-hour inter-city bus service" in the country. In November 2020 the service was suspended indefinitely by Bus Éireann but the service is now operated by Translink although private companies continue to offer bus services between the two cities. These include Aircoach route 705X which operates between Dublin-Belfast-Derry.

A similar service to the Dublin-Belfast route was implemented on route 2 between Dublin Airport and Wexford, which started on 18 January 2009. Services departed Dublin Airport for Wexford on the hour from 05:00 to 23:00, with services during the night at 01:00 and 03:00. As of May 2022, no services exist on this route now between the hours of 00:00 and 06:00.

=== Expressway ===
'Expressway' is a division of Bus Éireann that provides intercity services throughout the country serving most of the main airports and cities in Ireland.

It is a commercial part of the company which, unlike the local and city services, does not receive government funding to operate.

Bus Éireann has also introduced regular clockface schedules on popular Expressway routes, such as hourly services on the routes Dublin/Athlone/Galway, Tralee/Killarney/Cork/Waterford, Cork/Limerick/Shannon Airport/Galway.

In 2021 with the launch of a new ticketing system for Expressway services, tickets ceased being interchangeable between expressway operated routes and PSO (i.e. Bus Éireann-branded) routes.

=== Nightrider ===
Bus Éireann introduced a number of Dublin 'Nightrider' services in the early 2000s, offering special Friday and Saturday night buses for people departing the city centre to return to locations in the Greater Dublin Area. Over busy periods, the Nightrider could also be extended to operate six days a week, Mon-Sat (observed during the Christmas 2005 period), offering late-night transport options to the towns of Newbridge, Drogheda, Navan, Enfield and Wicklow. The route numbers on the Nightrider services were suffixed with an 'N' to denote their night status.

- Route 101N operated from Dublin to Drogheda via Dublin Airport, Swords, Balrothery, Balbriggan, Gormanston Cross and Julianstown. The service left Dublin at 00:30 and 03:30 each Friday and Saturday night. At some point after the year 2013, the route was scrapped as the regular route 101 began to operate on a 24-hours a day basis, with the largest gap between departures being those at 01:30, 03:30 and 05:30.
- Route 109N operated from Dublin to Kells via Dublin Airport, Ashbourne, Ratoath, Dunshaughlin and Navan. On 30 May 2017, Bus Éireann announced it would be discontinuing the route. They did however notify that an alternative service was available on route 109A which operates hourly throughout the night, 7 days per week, 364 days per year. Route 109A operates hourly between 00:30-05:30 whilst the daytime route 109 is inactive.
- Route 126N operated from Dublin to Newbridge via Heuston Station, Inchicore, Newlands Cross, Citywest, Rathcoole Junction, Kill Junction and Naas. The service left Dublin at 00.30 and 03:30 each Friday and Saturday night. On 19 November 2018, Bus Éireann announced the termination of the route noting that costs to run the service were not being covered due to insufficient passenger numbers and it had been loss-making for some time. The operation of the daytime route 126 remained unaffected, but the last departure now left from Dublin at the earlier time of 23.00. In early December 2019 Go-Ahead Ireland took over operation of the route, and the National Transport Authority reinstated late night departures from the city. As of May 2022, route 126 caters for late-night passengers by departing from Connolly station (Mon-Sat) at the times of 00:05, 01:05 and 03:35.
- Route 133N operated from Dublin to Wicklow town, incorporating the towns of Kilmacanogue, Newtownmountkennedy, Newcastle, Ashford and Rathnew. The service left Dublin at 00.30 and 03:00 each Friday and Saturday night. In October 2008, Bus Éireann cancelled the service, mentioning that the route was no longer commercially viable. Others blamed the poor passenger numbers on the lack of adequate promotion or advertisement on the part of Bus Éireann with many people not even knowing the service existed.

The Nightrider service was also extended to Cork city and its environs during Christmas and other high-capacity events such as the Cork Jazz Festival. The service was also extended to Galway city for a time in 2008, departing Eyre Square at 01:30 for Moycullen, 02.30 for Spiddal and 03.30 for the towns of Oranmore and Claregalway. In December 2010 during a period of cold weather, Nightrider services from Dublin to Drogheda, Meath and Kildare were cancelled due to icy conditions.

=== Real-time passenger information ===
RTPI is run by the National Transport Authority under the brand Transport for Ireland, a single portal providing information on public transport in Ireland.

Real-time information is available across most Bus Éireann services providing up-to-the-minute details about the arrival of a bus at a specific stop. It is calculated using the GPS location of a bus and is estimated and changed with current traffic conditions. Real-time information is available on the Bus Éireann website and via the Real Time Ireland App. Many stops across Ireland have real-time information that allows the customer to see exactly when the bus will arrive.

RTPI began to roll out across bus services in Ireland from 2011.

=== Bus Scoile ===
Bus Scoile logo

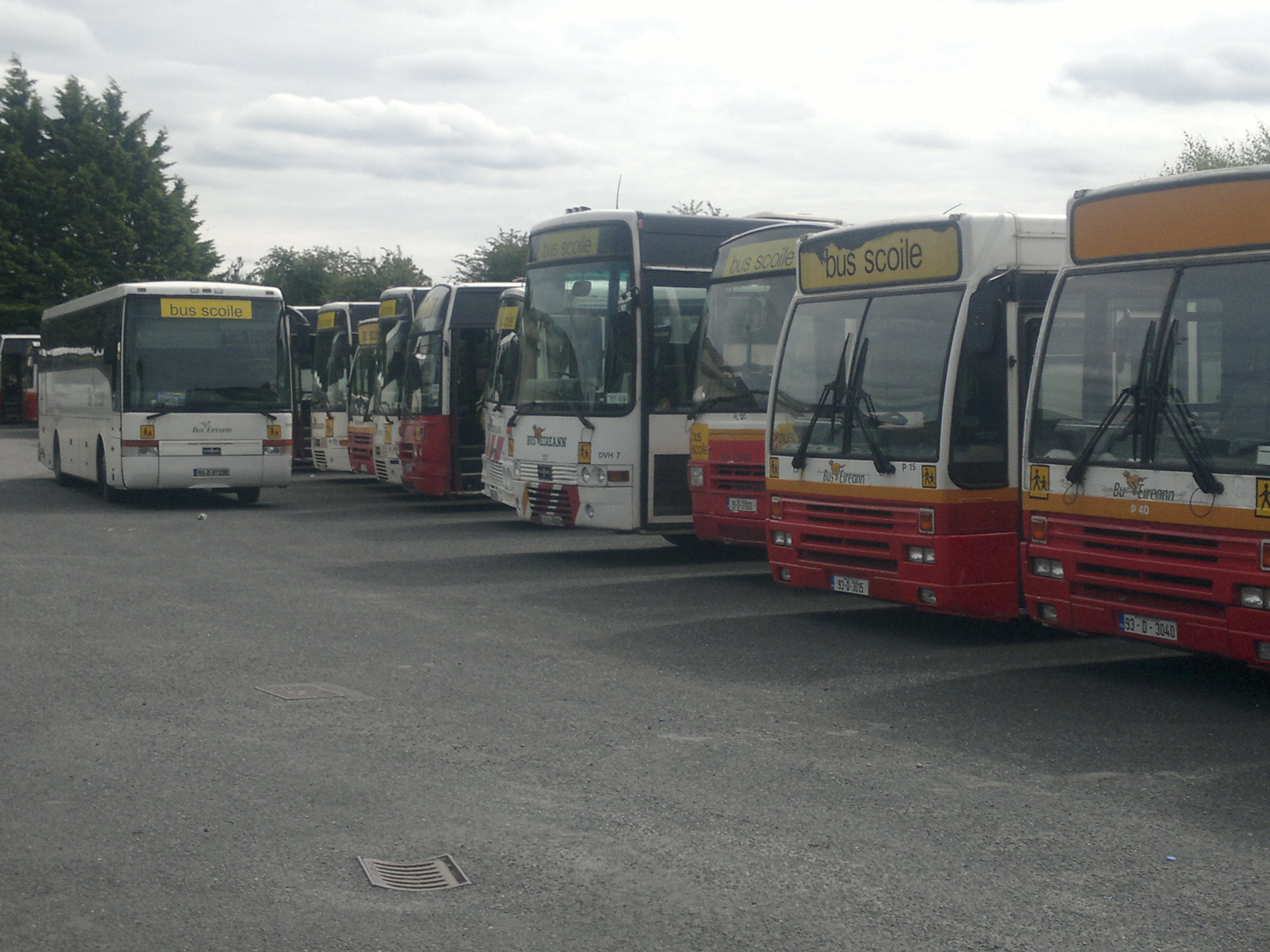
Bus Scoile buses in Thurles depot

Bus Éireann operates "Bus Scoile" (Irish for 'school bus'), the school transport scheme, on behalf of the Department of Education. County Meath VEC assists Bus Éireann in administering the service in County Meath to all second-level schools. Bus Éireann is responsible for planning routes, employing bus drivers, collecting fares and ensuring compliance with safety regulations and insurance. For the 2023/2024 school year 161,000 students used the service.

The 'schools' services were formerly operated mostly by cascaded second-hand ex-frontline vehicles. Due to regulations regarding seatbelts, all dated and unsuited vehicles were withdrawn and replaced with second-hand vehicles (mainly from the UK). From 2006 to 2016, Bus Éireann purchased new buses from BMC, Euro Coach Builders Donegal, Alexander Dennis and TAM Motors Slovenia in 2016.

A number of the routes are outsourced to local bus companies such as Dunshaughlin Coach Hire, Jerry Ryan, O'Rourkes, Bernard Kavanaghs, Bartons, and James Mullally Coach Hire.

== Stations ==
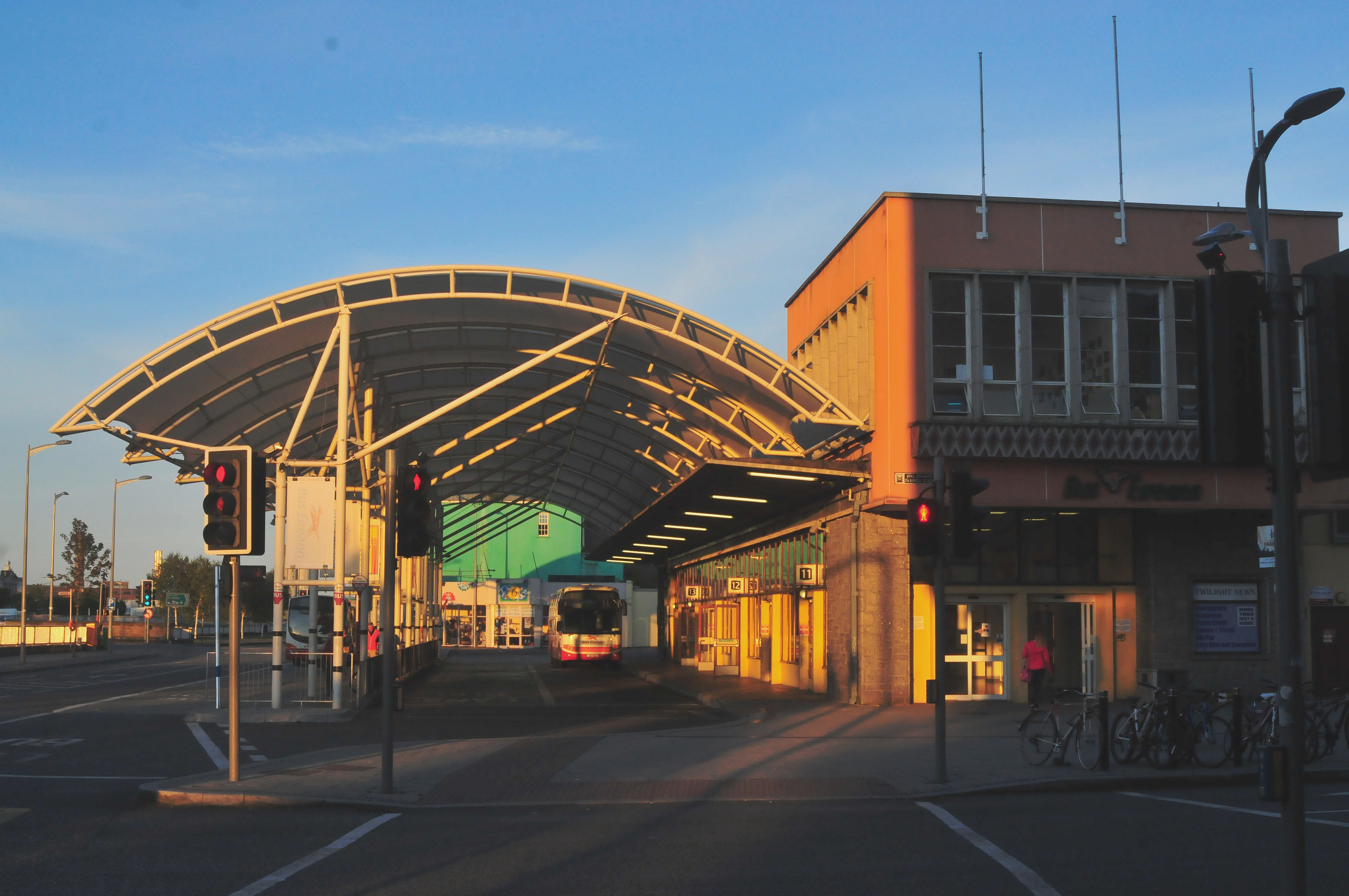
Parnell Place bus station in Cork

Bus Éireann operates from 17 bus stations across Ireland:

- Athlone
- Ballina
- Ballyshannon
- Cavan
- Cork Parnell Place
- Drogheda
- Busáras, Dublin
- Dundalk Long Walk
- Ennis
- Galway Ceannt
- Killarney
- Letterkenny
- Limerick Colbert
- Monaghan
- Sligo MacDiarmada
- Tralee Casement
- Waterford Merchants Quay

== Safety ==
Bus Éireann has had a few fatal incidents, with those involving school buses being particularly scrutinised. After the death of five schoolgirls in a fatal accident in County Meath in 2005 involving a 1993 DAF MB230/Van Hool (ex-front line expressway) school bus. All school buses are fitted with seatbelts since 31 October 2011.

Some non-fatal incidents have also been quite serious, for example, an off-duty bus plunging into the River Liffey in Dublin, after a collision with another vehicle.

The company has also posted notices to encourage orderly queuing at bus stops after a series of incidents where pedestrians on the footpath were struck on the head by the wing mirrors of city buses.

In 2023 an Expressway bus caught fire, shortly after departing from Donegal Town. The 15 passengers on the bus escaped uninjured.

== Natural gas buses ==
Bus Éireann introduced the first NGV on 17 July 2012 in Cork. It operated on the 216 (Cork University Hospital - City Centre - Monkstown) route until mid-August 2012 on a trial that was undertaken in partnership with Ervia. The Eco-city bus was made by MAN.

== Fleet ==
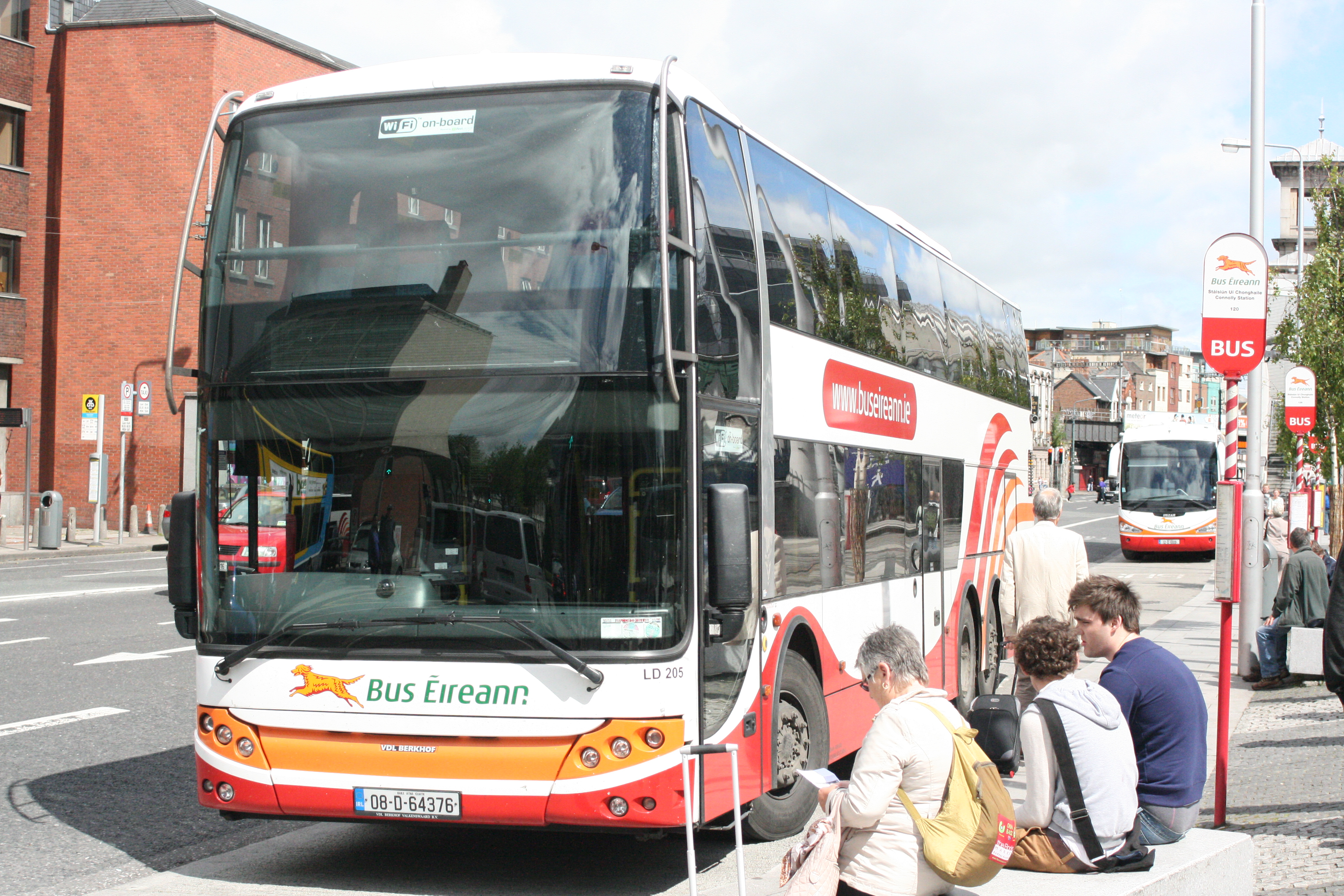
VDL Berkhof Axial outside Dublin Connolly station in July 2012

As of January 2018, the fleet consists of 1,200 buses and coaches. The company mainly uses buses built by firms such as Scania, VDL Berkhof and Volvo. Bus Éireann's fleet has been substantially invested in as part of the National Development Plan. The vast majority of the operating fleet for expressway, commuter, and local services are now five years old or less.
