= St Johnston, County Donegal =

Village in County Donegal, Ireland

St Johnston Baile Suingean
- Village
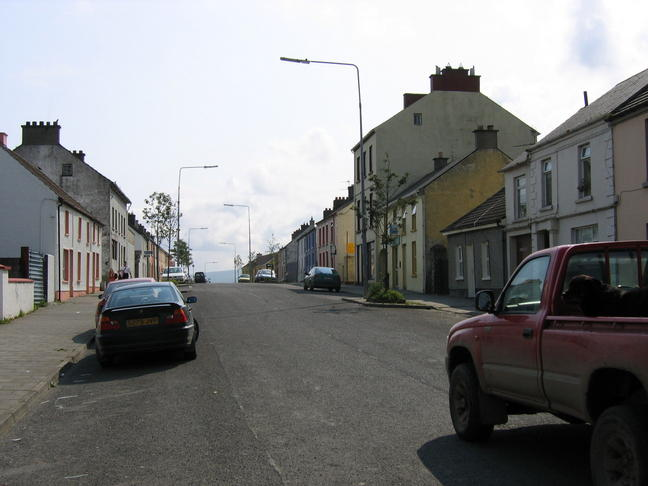
- Main Street

- Location in Ireland
- Coordinates: 54°56′05″N 07°27′30″W
- Country: Ireland
- Province: Ulster
- County: County Donegal
- Barony: Raphoe North

Government
  - Dáil constituency: Donegal

Population (2022)
  - Total: 571
- Time zone: UTC+0 (WET)
  - Summer (DST): UTC-1 (IST (WEST))
- Website: stjohnstonandcarrigans.com

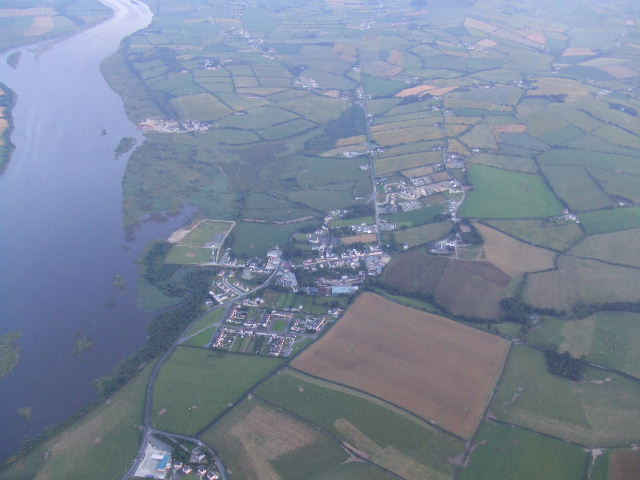
An aerial view of St Johnston, on the banks of the River Foyle

St Johnston, officially Saint Johnstown (Irish: Baile Suingean), is a village, townland, and an electoral division in County Donegal in Ulster, the northern province in Ireland. It is in the Laggan district of East Donegal on the left bank of the River Foyle. It is in the civil parish of Taughboyne and barony of Raphoe North, on the R236 (Lifford–Newtowncunningham) road where it overlaps the R265 (Carrigans–Raphoe) road. The village is about 12 kilometres (7.5 mi) south of Derry.

== Architecture ==
St Baithin's Church (popularly known as 'the Chapel'), the Catholic parish church in the village, was designed by E. W. Godwin, the mid-Victorian British architect. It is a neo-Gothic structure that was built between 1857 and 1860.

St Johnston Presbyterian Church, located on the Derry Road, is the other main structure within the village. Parts of this church, or kirk, may date to c. 1724. However, most of the present neo-Gothic structure was built in the early nineteenth century. The 'thin' neo-Gothic tower was built in 1849. This church, which is owned by the Presbyterian Church in Ireland, was severely damaged by a lightning strike in the mid-1980s. The tower of the church was particularly damaged. The building, however, which serves the large Ulster Scots Presbyterian community in this part of The Laggan, had been fully restored by around 1990.

== History ==
Mongavlin Castle (also known as Mongevlin Castle), a ruined castle, is located approximately three kilometres (1.9 mi) south of the village. It was once a stronghold of the Ó Domhnaill (O'Donnell) clan, Kings of Tír Chonaill. In the very early seventeenth century, Mongevlin was the chief residence of Iníon Dubh (d. 1608), the daughter of both Séamus Mac Dhòmhnaill, 6th Laird of Dunnyveg, an Islay-based Gaelic nobleman, and his wife, Lady Agnes Campbell; Iníon Dubh was the mother of Red Hugh O'Donnell. When Iníon Dubh came to Ulster to marry Sir Aodh mac Maghnusa Ó Domhnaill (Sir Hugh McManus O'Donnell; c. 1540 – c. 1600), she brought a force of 100 of the biggest men she could find in Scotland for protection. 80 of these were of the name Crawford. When Mongavlin was eventually abandoned, the Crawfords settled and married in the locality. Many of their descendants can still be found in the area to this day.

On 23 July 1610, at the start of the Plantation of Ulster, Mongevlin Castle and its lands were granted to the 2nd Duke of Lennox (1574–1624), a senior-ranking Scottish nobleman. Lennox, who was already a peer in the Peerage of Scotland, was created the 1st Duke of Richmond in the Peerage of England in 1623, making him a duke twice over. On his death on 16 February 1624, the title of Duke of Lennox and the castle and lands at Mongavlin passed to his brother Esmé, 1st Earl of March (1579–1624), who now became (briefly) the 3rd Duke of Lennox. Esmé had married Katherine Clifton (c. 1592–1637) in 1609; she became the 2nd Baroness Clifton, suo jure, in 1618. After her husband Esmé's death in August 1624, Katherine, now Dowager Duchess of Lennox, then married the 2nd Earl of Abercorn (c. 1604 – c. 1670), another Scottish nobleman, c. 1632. Unlike the Dukes of Lennox, Lord Abercorn had actually moved to Ulster, where he was now based. The centre of Lord Abercorn's estate was the nearby town of Strabane in West Tyrone.

A borough was established at the site in the reign of King James VI & I during the early years of the Plantation of Ulster. St Johnstown was a borough constituency in the Irish House of Commons from about 1619 to the Acts of Union 1800. The borough was a rotten borough and the settlement never more than a village.

King James II passed through on his way to the Siege of Derry in 1690. From St. Johnston, he sent a letter proposing surrender, which was rejected.

St Johnston was one of several Protestant villages in East Donegal that would have been transferred to Northern Ireland had the recommendations of the Irish Boundary Commission been enacted in 1925.

== Sports ==
St Johnston Cricket Club, founded in 1898, plays in the North West Cricket League Championship (Second) Division.

Kildrum Tigers Football Club, sometimes known as 'the Wee Toun', is an association football club founded in 1948. The club fields teams in the Ulster Senior League.

Local bowling clubs, all playing in the Donegal Indoor Bowling League Division One, include St Johnston Bowling Club, St Johnston Pres. Bowling Club and St Johnston Resource Centre Bowling Club.

== Transport ==
The town had a station on the Great Northern Railway which was closed in 1965.

The nearest railway station now is operated by Northern Ireland Railways and runs from Derry~Londonderry in Derry, via Coleraine, to both Grand Central Station and Lanyon Place Station in Belfast.

== Notable people ==
- Oliver Bond – Irish rebel, member of the Society of United Irishmen, possibly born in St Johnston in 1760.
- The Most Rev. Dr Niall Coll, Lord Bishop of Ossory - raised at the bottom of the Hillhead Brae in St. Johnston.
- Ronan Curtis – Republic of Ireland international footballer who was raised in St Johnston
- Michael Lynch – Donegal inter-county Gaelic footballer
- Enda McClafferty - Political Editor of BBC Northern Ireland; born and raised in Letterkenny, he has lived for many years on the outskirts of St. Johnston.
- Tommy Peoples – musician and fiddler.
- Tyler Toland – Republic of Ireland women's footballer.

== See also ==
- List of towns and villages in the Republic of Ireland
- List of towns in Northern Ireland
