= Carrigans, County Donegal =

Village in County Donegal, Ireland

Carrigans An Carraigín
- Village
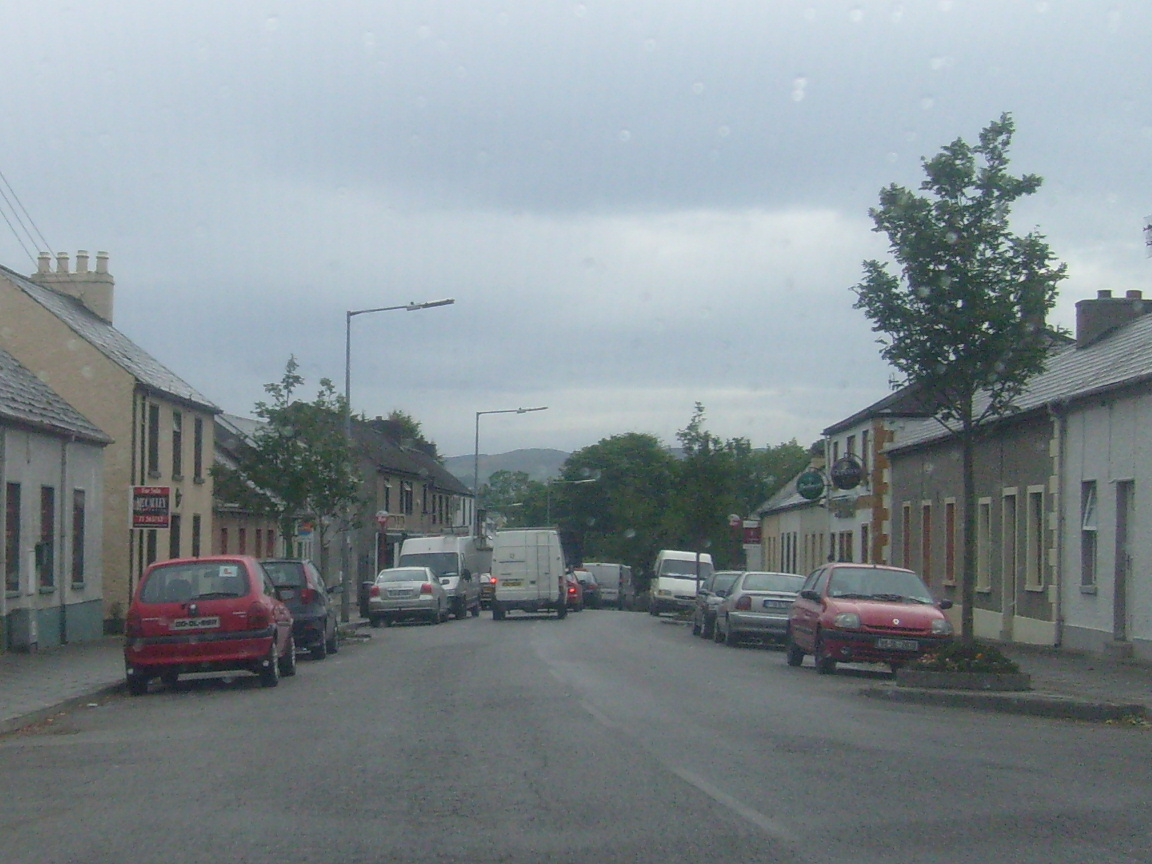

- Location in Ireland
- Coordinates: 54°57′06″N 7°25′43″W
- Country: Ireland
- Province: Ulster
- County: County Donegal
- Barony: Raphoe North

Government
  - Dáil Éireann: Donegal

Population (2022)
  - Total: 389
- Time zone: UTC+0 (WET)
  - Summer (DST): UTC-1 (IST (WEST))
- Website: www.stjohnstonandcarrigans.com

Carrigans (Irish: An Carraigín, meaning 'little rock') is a village in The Laggan, a district in the east of County Donegal in Ulster, the northern province in Ireland. The village is located on the R236 regional road, a short distance from the River Foyle.

== History ==
Carrigans was at one time the centre of a major flax and linen producing area, possessing one of the largest flax mills in County Donegal, before the demise of the flax industry in the 1950s. Commercial salmon fishing was also a major employer in the past.

Killea (St. Fiach's) Parish Church (Church of Ireland) is in the village of Carrigans.

Carrigans once had a railway station, the village being served by the Great Northern Railway, which closed in 1965.

The Bangalore torpedo, an explosive device used in many conflicts, was invented by Captain (later Colonel) McClintock, of Dunmore, Carrigans.

Carrigans was one of several Protestant villages in eastern Donegal that would have been transferred to Northern Ireland, had the recommendations of the Irish Boundary Commission been enacted in 1925.

== Notable residents ==
- Dunmore House, on the edge of the village, was formerly the home of the McClintock dynasty, an Ulster-Scots family. It is now owned by Sir John McFarland, 3rd Bt.
- Sir Jim Starritt, a former Deputy Commissioner of the Metropolitan Police, was born in Carrigans.
- The writer Dame Agatha Christie visited Carrigans on a few occasions, as a guest of the McClintocks of Dunmore, to whom she was related through marriage.

== See also ==
- List of populated places in Ireland
