= River Foyle =

River in the northwest of the island of Ireland

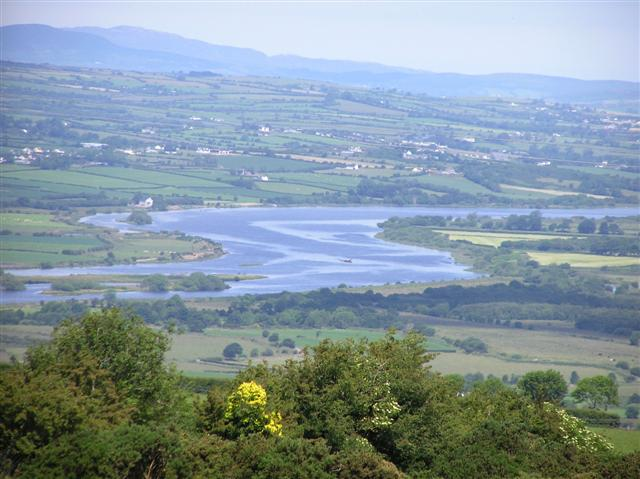
- River Foyle from Holly Hill, near Strabane, with the Laggan district of East Donegal in the distance.
- Etymology: Feba(i)l, mythological figure
- Native name: An Feabhal (Irish)

Location
- Jurisdictions: Republic of Ireland, Northern Ireland
- Province: Ulster
- Counties: Donegal, Tyrone, Londonderry
- Cities: Derry

Physical characteristics
- Source: River Finn and River Mourne
  - location: Newtownstewart
  - coordinates: 54.721°N 7.365°W
- 2nd source: River Finn
  - location: Lough Finn
  - coordinates: 54.859°N 8.135°W
- Source confluence
  - location: Strabane / Lifford
  - coordinates: 54.829°N 7.480°W
- Mouth: Lough Foyle
  - coordinates: 55.107°N 7.079°W
- Length: 32 km (20 mi)

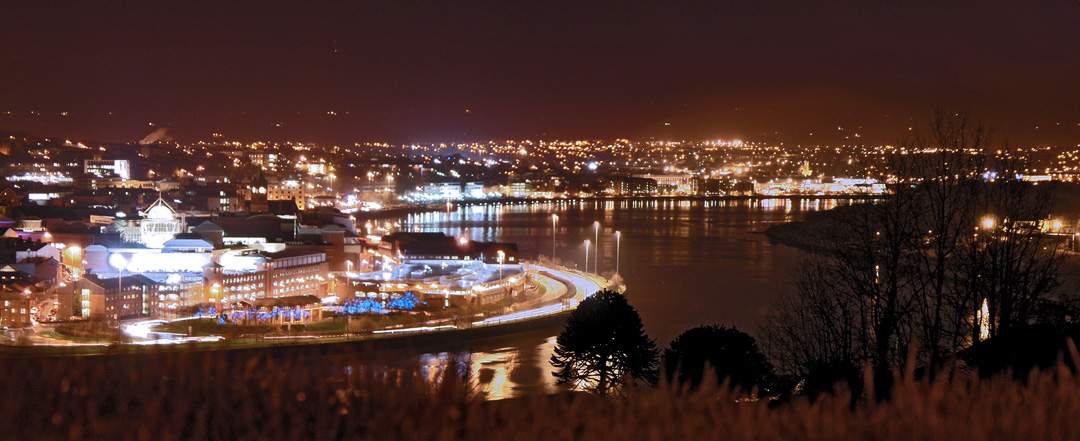
The River Foyle at night in Derry

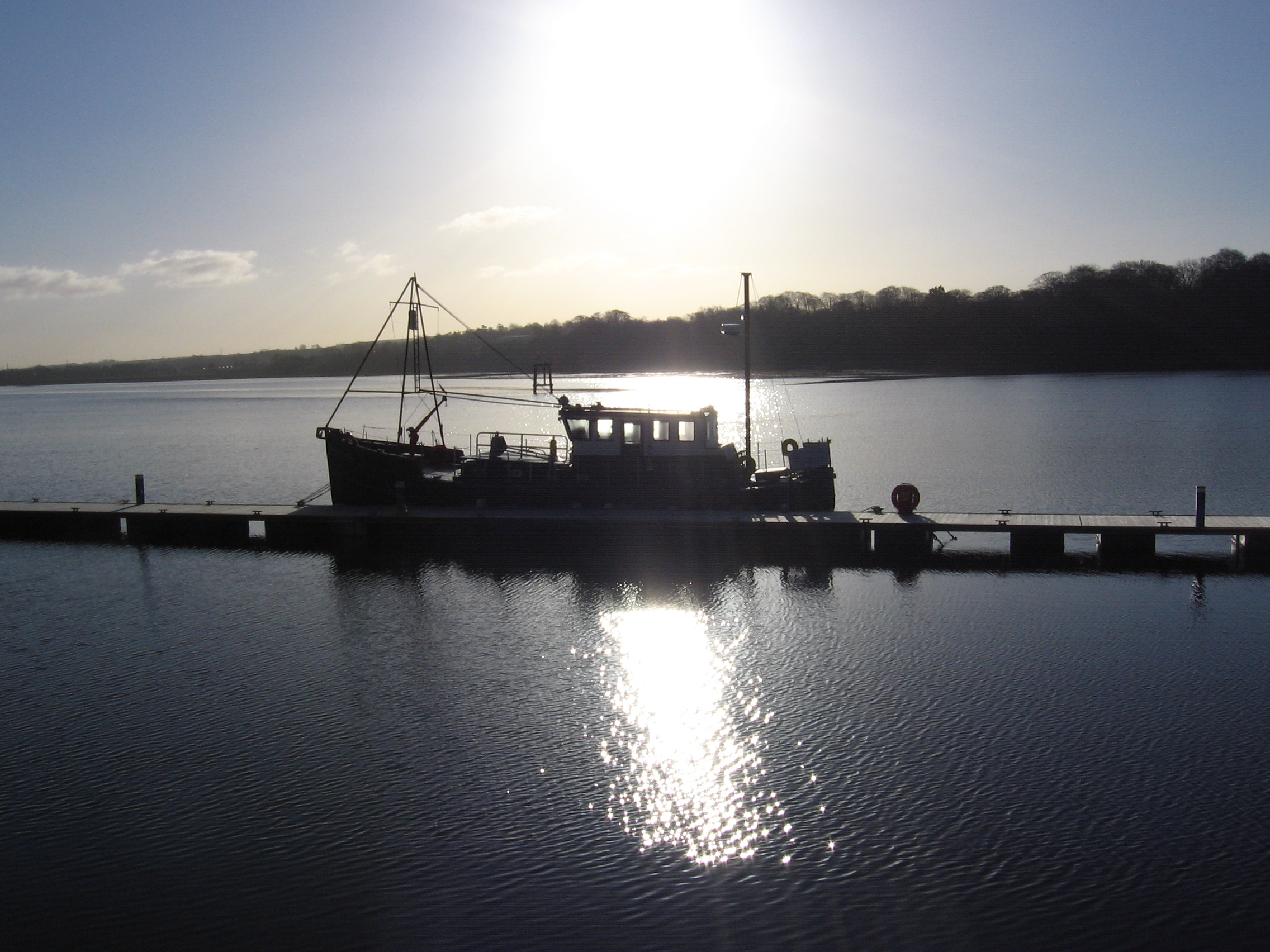
The Foyle, early morning, April 2006

The River Foyle (from Irish An Feabhal) is a river in west Ulster in the northwest of the island of Ireland, which flows from the confluence of the rivers Finn and Mourne at the towns of Lifford in County Donegal, Republic of Ireland, and Strabane in County Tyrone, Northern Ireland. From here it flows to the city of Derry, where it discharges into Lough Foyle and, ultimately, the Atlantic Ocean. The total length of the River Foyle is 32 km (20 mi). The river separates part of County Donegal from parts of both County Londonderry and County Tyrone. The district of County Donegal that borders the western bank of the River Foyle is traditionally known as the Laggan. This district includes the villages of St Johnston and Carrigans, both of which are nestled on the banks of the river.

== Tributaries ==
The Burn Dale (also known as the Burn Deele or the River Deele) flows into the River Foyle on the northern outskirts of Lifford, while the Swilly Burn flows into the Foyle near Porthall, a village between St Johnston and Lifford. St Johnston Burn flows into the Foyle at St Johnston, while Flushtoun Burn flows into the river on the southern outskirts of St Johnston. Carrigans Burn flows from Port Lough, and enters the Foyle on the southern outskirts of Carrigans. Both the Glenmornan River and the Burn Dennet flow into the Foyle just to the north of Ballymagorry, entering the river a short distance to the north of Corkan Isle.

== Name ==
Claudius Ptolemy's Geography (2nd century AD) described a river mouth called Ουιδουα (Widua, from PIE *widhu, 'tree') which referred to the Foyle.

The Irish name is An Feabhal, which refers to Febail, father of the mythical Bran.

== Crossings ==
The River Foyle is also the fastest-flowing river in Europe for its size, making the construction of bridges across it difficult. In Derry, the main crossing point, there are three bridges. The southernmost bridge, the oldest of the three, is Europe's only road traffic double-decker bridge and is officially known as the Craigavon Bridge (occasionally referred to colloquially as the Blue Bridge). The northernmost bridge, known as the Foyle Bridge, is a much larger bridge and was built to accommodate tall ships at a time when it was envisaged that the city would need to accommodate such vessels. However, this proved unnecessary as the main port was moved several miles north of the city and the large vessels it was designed for never had to come so far south. The Foyle Bridge was planned originally by the Londonderry Development Commission and was intended to alleviate the traffic congestion on the existing Craigavon Bridge and in the city centre. However, political prevarication meant that it was not constructed until the 1980s. Derry's third bridge, the Peace Bridge, is situated behind the Guildhall Square, north of the Craigavon Bridge. The pedestrian and cycle bridge was opened in 2011, intended as a symbol of union between the two sides of the city.

Outside Derry, the only bridge to cross the River Foyle is Lifford Bridge, which was built in the 1960s between Lifford, the county town of County Donegal, on the western bank of the river, and Strabane, a major town in County Tyrone, on the eastern bank.

== Navigation ==
The tidal Foyle is navigable from the coast to approximately sixteen kilometres (10 mi) inland. The derelict Strabane Canal continued from this point a further six kilometres (4 mi) to Strabane. Traffic on the Foyle further south than the northern bridge is now more or less restricted to pleasure boats with the occasional tanker coming in the refinery at the northern end of the town. A tour of the Foyle on board a small cruise ship called the Toucan One, once provided tourists a chance to travel along the River Foyle from Derry city centre to Greencastle County Donegal on the shores of Lough Foyle. However, because of a lack of funding from various sources, this venture has now come to a standstill.

== Foyle Search and Rescue ==
Due to the presence of three bridges over the river in Derry, some people choose to attempt suicide by jumping into the deep and fast-moving Foyle. 'Foyle Search and Rescue' was established as a charity in July 1993 and has adopted the role of protecting human life in the River Foyle from the Craigavon Bridge, Foyle Bridge and the newly opened Peace Bridge. Between 1993 and 2008 it dealt with more than 1000 people in distress.

== Fishing ==
Prior to the Plantation of Ulster the fishing rights on the river would have been owned by the O’Neills and the O’Donnells, the Chieftains of Tír Eoghain and Donegal respectively. When the Plantation of Ulster started in 1609 a body called The Honourable The Irish Society had been set up by Royal Charter in 1613 to administer the affairs of the Plantation. The Society was then given the rights to the fishing on the river and on the River Bann, all except the parts of the rivers owned by the Bishop of Derry. In 1944 an action for trespass was taken by the Society against a fisherman from Porthall who they deemed to be fishing illegally. The case was heard by Mr Justice George Gavan Duffy in the high court in Dublin during 1947–48. The case was dismissed against the man. The Society then appealed the decision and also appealed to both Northern and Southern Governments at losing the case. Both Governments agreed to buy the fishing rights for the sum of £110,280 on condition that they drop the appeal. This led to the establishment of a commission to oversee the fishing on the river and on Lough Foyle. The body set up was called the Foyle Fisheries Commission and was established by a Bill passed simultaneously by the Governments of the Republic of Ireland and Northern Ireland on 25 March 1952. The Foyle Fisheries Commission was disestablished on 10 April 2007 with the signing of the Foyle & Carlingford Fisheries Act 2007. The Foyle is believed to be one of the best Atlantic Salmon rivers in Ireland. Details of the fishing regulations are available from the Loughs Agency. The village of St Johnston, which lies on the County Donegal bank of the river, is a major fishing settlement on the Foyle.

== Railways ==
The riverbank has the Belfast-Derry railway line providing a key link to the city of Derry. Trains bring passengers along on the NI Railways service along the shoreline of Lough Foyle from onward stations such as Coleraine, Belfast Lanyon Place and Belfast Grand Central.

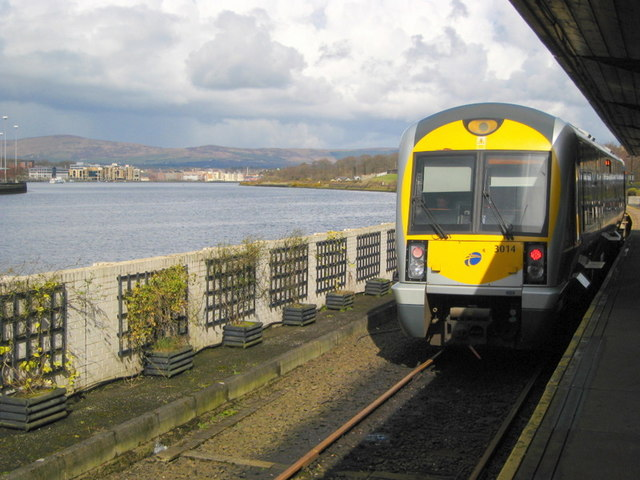
Northern Ireland Railways at Derry~Londonderry railway station.

== See also ==
- Rivers of Ireland
- List of rivers of Ireland
