= Carrick, County Donegal (FV) =

Carrick An Charraig
- Townland
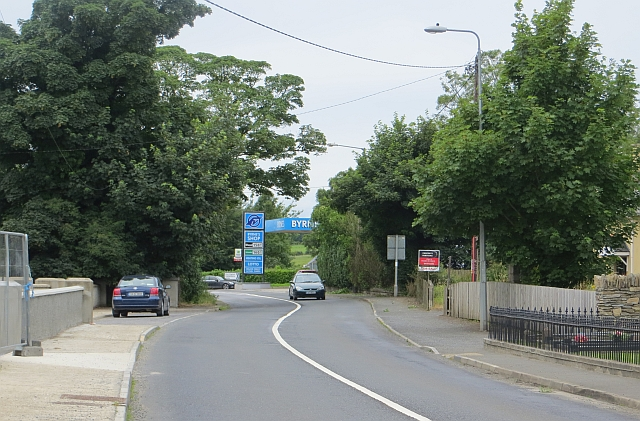
- The N15 passes through Carrick townland
- Interactive map of Carrick
- Coordinates: 54.808°N 7.616°W
- Country: Ireland
- County: County Donegal
- Province: Ulster
- Region: Finn Valley
- Electoral division: Killygordon ED
- Civil parish: Donaghmore

Area
  - Total: 1.6168 km^{2} (0.6242 sq mi)

Population (2011)
  - Total: 60
- Time zone: (GMT+1)

Carrick (Irish: An Charraig, meaning 'the rock') is a townland in the civil parish of Donaghmore and the electoral division of Killygordon in County Donegal, Ireland. It is located on the N15 in the Finn Valley. Carrick, which is approximately 1.61 km^{2} (400 acres) in area, is bordered by the townland of Liscooly.

== History ==
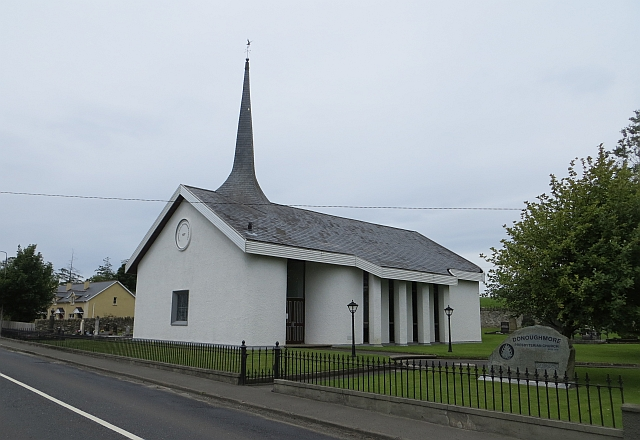
Donoughmore church, Carrick

Donoughmore Church is a Presbyterian church located at Carrick. Founded in 1658, the church also has a graveyard joined next to it. It is a part of the Donaghmore parish along with Carnowen and Saint Anne's church, Crossroads.

Donaghmore House was a Victorian house located at Donaghmore Glebe, Castlefin. It was destroyed in a fire in 2018. It was a ten bedroom house owned by the spence family between 1750 and 1800.

== Amenities ==
The local national (primary) school, Donoughmore National School, had an enrollment of approximately 30 pupils in 2024. "Go Liscooly" is a petrol station located in nearby Carricknashane townland.

== Geography ==
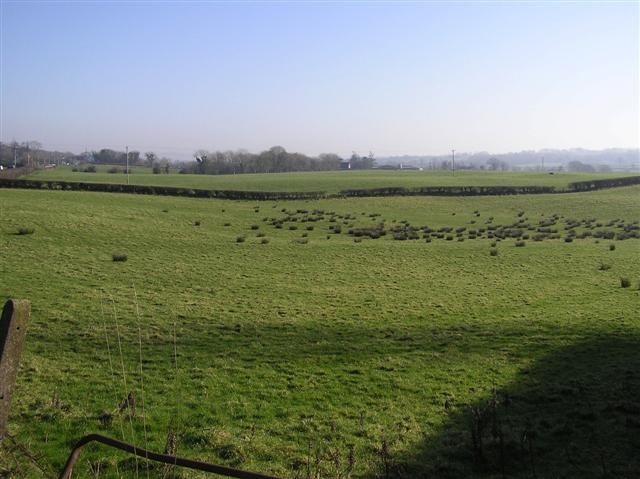
Fields in Carrick townland

Carrick is part of the civil parish of Donaghmore. A number of townlands which border Carrick are part of the Liscooley hamlet. The townlands which border Carrick include:

Nearby townlands by Carrick
Townland	Distance from Carrick
Liscooly	2.5 km
Carricknashane	2.7 km
Magheraboy	3.2 km
Leaght	3.3 km
Carnowen	5.7 km
Donoughmore Glebe	4.3 km
