= Creeslough explosion =

2022 explosion in Donegal, Ireland

- The Applegreen petrol station following the explosion
- Date: 7 October 2022
- Time: 15:17 (IST)
- Location: Creeslough, County Donegal, Ireland; 55.1192°N 7.9057°W
- Type: Gas explosion (suspected)
- Deaths: 10
- Injuries: 8

The Creeslough explosion occurred on 7 October 2022 at an apartment above Applegreen petrol station in Creeslough, a village in north County Donegal, Ireland. It killed ten people and left eight hospitalised; the highest number of civilian casualties in the county in decades. Investigators suspected an accidental gas leak.

== Explosion ==
The explosion occurred at 15:17 IST at an Applegreen petrol station and adjacent building, seriously damaging the forecourt and partially collapsing the adjoining building. The building behind the service station forecourt comprised apartments over a retail area, which included a convenience store with a deli counter, a post office and a hair salon. Up to 30 people are believed to have been in the complex when the explosion occurred, including schoolchildren.

Emergency services from both sides of the border with Northern Ireland assisted local services in the search and rescue operation. On 8 October, the Garda Síochána (Gardaí) said the death toll was ten, with no one listed as missing, adding that the information obtained so far suggested it was a "tragic accident". The dead were four men, three women, a teenage boy and girl, and a five-year-old girl. Their names were released by Gardaí on 9 October, and their ages ranged from 5 to 59.

Eight people were hospitalised, some airlifted by the Irish Coast Guard and Air Ambulance Northern Ireland helicopters, one male in his 20s to St. James's Hospital, Dublin in a critical condition. The condition of the other seven was stable. Fire crews and ground ambulances transported the remaining injured and the dead to Altnagelvin Area Hospital in Derry and Letterkenny University Hospital. In Dublin, Howth Coast Guard was tasked to the Phoenix Park to assist with a landing zone for inbound helicopters from Mulroy Coast Guard.

== Reactions ==
Applegreen founder and chief executive Joe Barrett said the company was "utterly shocked and saddened" by the incident.

A special mass was held in Creeslough the morning after the explosion during which prayers were said for everyone impacted by the explosion. Parish priest Fr John Joe Duffy told the congregation the small village had been hit by a "tsunami of grief".

Taoiseach Micheál Martin visited the site of the explosion the evening after it happened, accompanied by Minister for Agriculture, Food and the Marine Charlie McConalogue, who said there was "deep sadness" in the village and a "terrible silence" reflecting the enormity of the incident, adding that "the entire nation is mourning".

A memorial mass service was held at 7:30 pm the same evening and was attended by over 400 people, including Taoiseach Micheál Martin, Tánaiste Leo Varadkar, Sinn Féin leader Mary Lou McDonald, Sinn Féin's Stormont leader Michelle O'Neill and SDLP leader Colum Eastwood. A red candle was lit by the Bishop of Raphoe Alan McGuckian for each of the victims.

On 9 October, two days after the explosion, thousands of people attended vigils across County Donegal in memory of the ten people who died. The first of almost 20 vigils was held in Milford, a half an hour's drive from the scene of the explosion.

Books of condolence were opened throughout the country, including at Cork County Hall, Tralee's County Buildings, Kilkenny City Hall, Downpatrick's Downshire Civic Centre, Newry's O'Hagan House, Derry Guildhall and Belfast City Hall.

=== Political ===
Shortly after the first report of the explosion, Fine Gael junior minister Josepha Madigan tweeted that she hoped "they find the culprits". Criticised as irresponsible and insensitive, Madigan quickly deleted the tweet and on 18 October apologised during a Newstalk radio interview.

President Michael D. Higgins said: "This tragedy is a terrible blow to a community that is closely knit and where every loss and injury will be felt by every member of the community and far beyond." Taoiseach Micheál Martin described these as the "darkest of days for Donegal and the entire country". Tánaiste Leo Varadkar called the explosion an "unthinkable tragedy" and "freak accident".

Minister for Justice Helen McEntee commended the work of the emergency services and said "the entire community I know will be coming to terms with this for a long time".

Sinn Féin president, Mary Lou McDonald, said this was a "devastating loss for a small community" and Sinn Féin TD Pearse Doherty said the village will be "forever changed".

Northern Ireland's First Minister-designate and vice president of Sinn Féin, Michelle O'Neill said: "The whole country has the community of Cresslough and Co Donegal in our thoughts."

The British Prime Minister, Liz Truss, said she was "shocked and saddened by the tragic loss of life in Donegal".

A Vatican City letter to bishop Alan McGuckian said Pope Francis "implores the divine blessings of consolation and healing upon the injured, the displaced and the families coping with pain of loss".

King Charles III sent a message expressing "heartfelt sympathy and deepest condolences" to the President of Ireland on 10 October.

=== Diplomatic ===
United States Ambassador to Ireland Claire D. Cronin sent a message to say she was thinking of those affected and the first responders.

On 11 October, Irish flags in embassies across the world were flown at half mast, while the Flag of Poland also flew at half mast at the country's Dublin embassy.

On 17 October, Palestinian Ambassador to Ireland Jilan Wahba Abdalmjid extended her condolences to those affected during a visit to County Donegal.

=== Sport ===
Announcements postponing sports events began before any fatalities were announced. This included the postponement of the Donegal Harvest Rally (the last of the National Rally Championship), while the 2022 Donegal Senior Football Championship final between Naomh Conaill and St Eunan's (scheduled for the Sunday) was also called off. The 2022 Frances Browne Literary Festival was among other events that were postponed.

Liam McElhinney, chairman of St Michael's GAA club in Creeslough, said some of the club's members were killed in the explosion.

Other sportspeople who spoke about the impact of the explosion included Séamus Coleman (via Everton's official Twitter account) and Packie Bonner.

A moment of silence was held at Kingspan Stadium before the Ulster and Ospreys game in the United Rugby Championship on 8 October.

Celtic held a moment of silence at Celtic Park in Glasgow before their UEFA Champions League game with RB Leipzig on 11 October.

That evening, the Scotland and Republic of Ireland teams wore black armbands in their FIFA Women's World Cup qualifying match, and Amber Barrett (from nearby Milford) dedicated her winning goal to Creeslough.

Finn Harps observed a moment of silence at Finn Park in Ballybofey before their League of Ireland Premier Division game against Dundalk on 14 October.

== Aftermath ==
Funeral details for some of the victims were announced on 10 October.

On 11 October, the first two funerals were held. The rest of the funerals were held at later dates.

A support fund set up by the Irish Red Cross for the Creeslough community reached more than €1 million by 15 October. By 20 October the Red Cross had begun distributing funds.

On 18 October, the post office which was destroyed reopened temporarily elsewhere in Creeslough, with Kilmacrennan the closest post office until then.

A "Together for Creeslough" concert to thank first responders was held on 30 January 2023 at the Aura Centre in Letterkenny, hosted by Moya Brennan and Mairéad Ní Mhaonaigh and featuring Brian McFadden and Keith Duffy, Lisa McHugh, Brian Kennedy, and local school choirs.

TG4 aired a documentary on the response to and immediate aftermath of the explosion on 8 February 2023, despite some of the victims' families expressing concern about the timing of the programme.

=== Investigation ===
Technical examinations continued throughout October and November, and Gardaí indicated that the exact cause would take some time to determine.

On 9 October, Gardaí secured CCTV footage of the explosion which was taken from a nearby building, showing the windows of the apartment on an upper floor being blown out and the building collapsing on top of the forecourt seconds later. They also obtained a court order preventing people from interfering with the site.

The Irish Aviation Authority implemented a drone ban within 5.5 kilometres (3.4 mi) of Creeslough and later extended it.

Experts from several bodies were called in to assist: the Garda Technical Bureau, the Commission for Regulation of Utilities, the Health and Safety Authority and DNV.

On 17 November 2022, Garda forensic experts completed their scientific examination of the explosion site. A Garda spokesperson said that while the physical examination of the site had concluded, the investigation would still continue.

=== Arrests ===
On 22 March 2024, two men in their 50s were arrested for "alleged offences contrary to the Non-Fatal Offences Against the Person Act 1997", but later released without charge.

On 27 May 2024, two people in their 40s (a man and a woman) were arrested for "alleged offences contrary to the Non-Fatal Offences Against the Person Act 1997".

On 21 November 2024, a man in his 60s was arrested in relation to the explosion, also for "alleged offences contrary to the Non-Fatal Offences Against the Person Act 1997".

A further (sixth) arrest was made in September 2025.

All those arrested were questioned and released without any charges arising and, as of April 2026, no one had been charged in connection with the incident.

=== Litigation ===
As of 2025, a dispute over the distribution of insurance payouts to those impacted by the explosion was ongoing in the Commercial Court. In February 2026, "part settlement" was reportedly reached in relation to this dispute.

== See also ==
- List of explosions
- 1943 Ballymanus mine disaster – the previous time a death toll of 10 in one incident was surpassed in County Donegal
- 1980 Central Hotel fire – in Bundoran
- 2022 St Helier explosion
