= Coolyslin =

Coolyslin Cúil na Slinne
- Townland
- Interactive map of Coolyslin
- Coordinates: 54°47′27″N 7°35′23″W
- Country: Ireland
- County: County Donegal
- Province: Ulster
- Electoral division: Urney West ED

Area
  - Total: 0.6406 km^{2} (0.2473 sq mi)

Population (2011)
  - Total: 73
- Time zone: (GMT+1)
- Area code: +353

Coolyslin (Irish: Cúil na Slinne) is a townland to the south of the town of Castlefin in County Donegal, Ireland. It is within the electoral division of Urney West. It is also a part of the hamlet of Cusheen and the parish of Urney and Castlefin. Coolyslin, which is approximately 0.64 km^{2} (0.25 sq mi) in area, lies on the L3044 between Ringsend and Doneyloop.

== Nearby amenities ==
Castlefinn Bridge (1760), located at Mullanboy, Ringsend, Castlefin, is around half a mile from Coolyslin.

Saint Columba's Church (1860) in Doneyloop, Castlefin, is around two miles from Coolyslin.

== Sub-townlands ==
Coolyslin is bordered by several other townlands and is composed of two sub-townlands.

Coolyslin subtownlands
Subtownland	Place	Road
Coolyslin Upper	To the south	R235
Coolyslin Lower	To the north	L3044
