= Donegal explosion =

Donegal explosion may refer to:

- Ballymanus mine disaster, in 1943: 18 people killed when trying to drag an unexploded naval mine ashore
- Creeslough explosion, in 2022: 10 people killed in an explosion at a petrol station and nearby shops and apartments
