= Carnowen =

Carnowen Carn Eoghain
- Townland
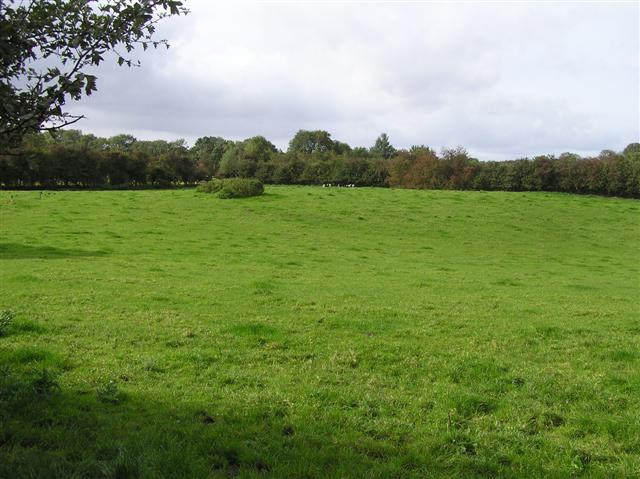
- Carnowen townland
- Interactive map of Carnowen
- Coordinates: 54°49′52″N 7°37′40″W
- Country: Ireland
- County: County Donegal
- Province: Ulster
- Region: Finn Valley

Area
  - Total: 6.75 km^{2} (2.61 sq mi)
- Time zone: (GMT+1)
- Postal code: F93

Carnowen (Irish: Carn Eoghain, meaning 'cairn of Eoghan'), also known as Carnone, is a townland in County Donegal, Ireland. It to the south of the town of Raphoe and within the Castlefinn electoral division in the Finn Valley area. It is within the civil parish of Donaghmore. At the centre of the townland is a crossroads with four roads: one leading to Castlefin, one to Killygordon at Liscooley, one to Raphoe and one to Convoy.

== Amenities ==
Carnowen Presbyterian Church is part of the Donaghmore parish along with Donoughmore church in Liscooly and Saint Anne's Church in Crossroads, Killygordon.

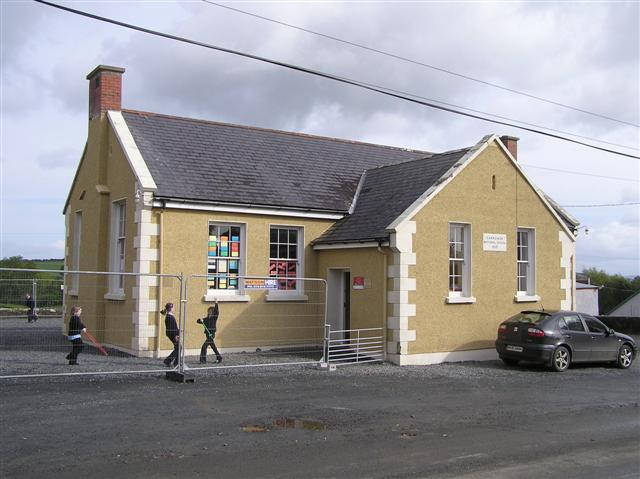
The former Carnowen National School building is now used as an office and hall

Carnowen National School was a former primary school located in the area. Built in 1912, it had two classrooms. It is now used as an office and hall.

There is a retail shop in Carnowen at the junction with Raphoe.

== Geography ==
Carnowen is bordered a number of other townlands. Carnowen townland itself has an area of 6.748 km2 (2.6 sq mi). Other townlands within the area include:

Townland	Gaelige	Electoral division	Postal address
Carnowen	Carn Eoghain	Castlefinn ED	Carnowen, Raphoe
Carrickbrack	Carraig Bhreac	Convoy ED	Carrickbrack, Convoy
Carnowen Hill (Carnowen)	Cnoc Carn Eoghain	Castlefinn ED	Carnowen Hill, Castlefin
Dooghan	~	Castlefinn ED (Cusheen)	Dooghan, Castlefin
Kildoney	Chill Dhuinn	Castlefinn ED	Kildoney, Castlefin
Powderley Upper	Powderley Uachtarach	Castlefinn ED	Powderley, Raphoe
Powderley Lower	Powderley níos ísle	Castlefinn ED	Powderley, Raphoe
Magherahee	Machaire Rua	Castlefinn ED	Magherahee, Castlefin
