= Carricknashane =

Townland in County Donegal, Ireland

- Townland
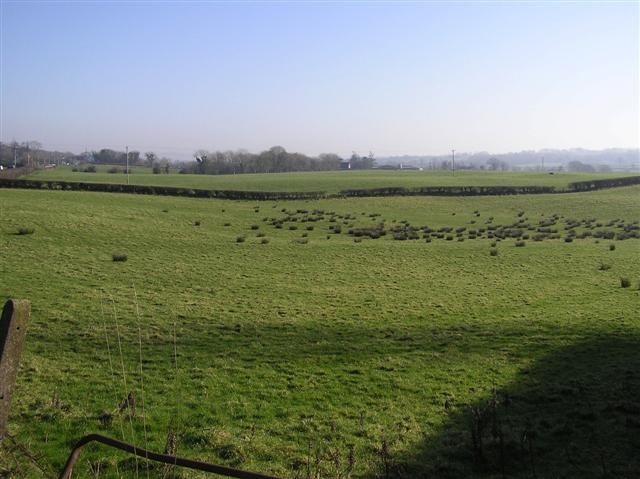
- Fields in Carricknashane townland
- Interactive map of Carricknashane
- Coordinates: 54°48′19″N 7°38′26″W
- Country: Ireland
- County: County Donegal
- Province: Ulster
- Electoral division: Killygordon ED
- Civil parish: Donoughmore

Area
  - Total: 0.5391 km^{2} (0.2081 sq mi)

Population (2011)
  - Total: 68
- Time zone: (GMT+1)

Carricknashane is a small townland in the electoral division of Killygordon, County Donegal, Ireland. It is in the civil parish of Donoughmore and lies on the Carnowen Road between Liscooley and Carnowen. Carricknashane, which has an area of approximately 0.54 km^{2} (0.21 sq mi), had a population of 68 as of the 2011 census. The Record of Monuments and Places records a standing stone in the townland.
