= Monellan Castle =

Former castellated mansion in County Donegal, Ireland

Monellan Castle was a large castellated mansion to the south of Crossroads near Killygordon in the east of County Donegal in Ireland. It was constructed in the eighteenth century for the Delap family, an Ulster-Scots family who acquired the estate in the late eighteenth century. The family also owned estates in Buckinghamshire in England. The Monellan Burn, also known as the Creamery Burn, runs along the western and north-western edge of the former demesne surrounding Monellan Castle, flowing into the River Finn nearby. The burn separated the Monellan Castle Demesne from the adjacent townland of Ballynaman (sometimes written as Ballinamana).

During the 1930s, the castle and its estate was acquired by the Irish Land Commission which redistributed the land to local tenant farmers, as was the policy at the time. The castle was then, with support from the Irish Government, demolished.
