= Crossroads, County Donegal =

Hamlet in Ulster Ireland

Crossroads Na Croisbhealaí The Cross
- Hamlet
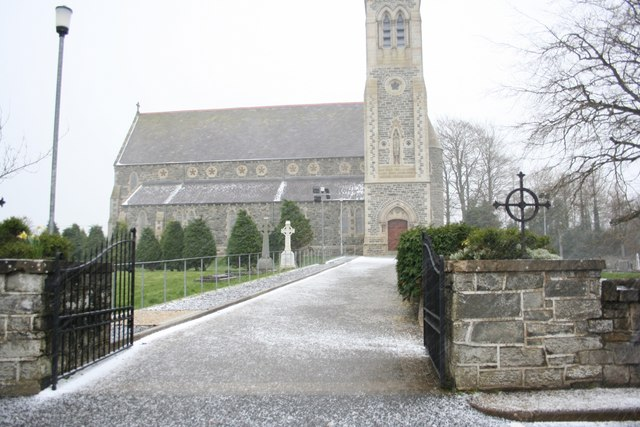
- St Patrick's Catholic Church, Crossroads, Gleneely
- Interactive map of Crossroads
- Coordinates: 54°47′08″N 7°41′29″W
- Country: Ireland
- Province: Ulster
- County: County Donegal
- Region: Finn Valley
  - Summer (DST): GMT+1
- Postal code: F93

Crossroads (Irish: Na Croisbhealaí), sometimes spelt Cross Roads and known locally as The Cross, is a hamlet south of the village of Killygordon in the Finn Valley in east County Donegal, Ireland. Located between Ballybofey and Castlefin, it is in the civil parish of Donaghmore and the Catholic parish of Killygordon. Crossroads is located largely within the townlands of Ballynacor and Dromore. The area takes its name from the junction of four local roads which lead variously to Gleneely, to Killygordon, to the town of Ballybofey and the town of Castlefin.

== Places of interest ==
Saint Patrick's Church is a Catholic church located in Ballynacor, Gleneely. Built in 1872 and then extended in 1893, the church is within the parish of Killygordon in the Roman Catholic Diocese of Derry. This parish spans Crossroads, Killygordon and Liscooley. The chapel has a graveyard and a spire.

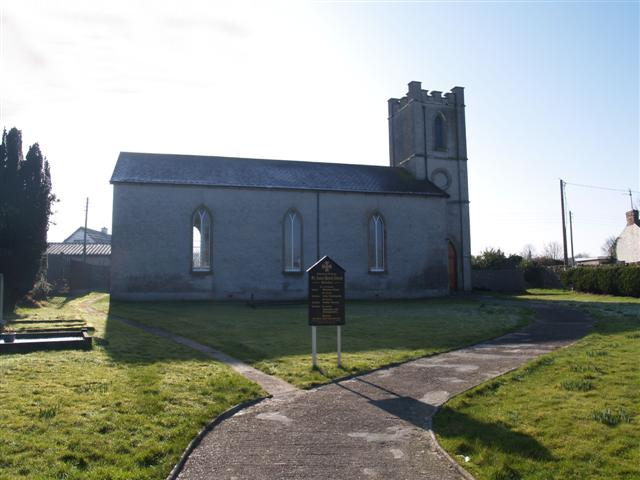
Saint Anne's Church of Ireland Church, Crossroads

Saint Anne's Church is a Church of Ireland church located in Dromore townland in Gleneely. Built in 1830, it is within Donaghmore parish along with Carnowen (Raphoe) and Donoughmore (Liscooley). The church is the Church of Ireland church for the Crossroads and Killygordon areas.

== Geography ==
The townlands in the Crossroads area, and the electoral divisions in which they lie, include:

Townland	Gaelige	Electoral division	Postal address
Ballynacor	Baile na Cora	Gleneely ED	Ballinacor, Killygordon
Dromore	Droim Mór	Killygordon ED	Dromore, Killygordon
Avaltygort	An tAbhallghort	Gleneely ED	Avaltygort, Killygordon
Ballyarrel	Baile Earrail	Gleneely ED	Ballyarrel, Killygordon
Drumfergus	Droim Fearghas	Gleneely ED	Drumfergus, Killygordon
Carn	An Carn	Killygordon ED	Carn, Ballybofey
Monellan	Maigh Nialláin	Gleneely ED	Monellan, Killygordon

There is one housing estate in Crossroads, Dromore Park, which is located within Dromore townland.

== Education ==
Crossroads has two primary schools, Dromore National School located at Dromore, Killygordon and Gleneely National School located at Gleneely, Killygordon.

Some pupils attend Finn Valley College or Saint Columba's College in Stranorlar for their secondary education.
