= Conal Gallen =

Irish comedian, actor and singer (born 1955)

- Born: 22 September 1955 (age 71); Ballybofey, County Donegal, Ireland

Comedy career
- Years active: 1980's - present
- Medium: Comedian
- Genre: Slapstick
- Subject: Comedy

Conal Gallen (born 22 September 1955) is an Irish comedian, actor and singer. He is best known for his comedy songs including "Horse It Into Ya Cynthia" and "I'll Make Love To You In The Henhouse (If You'll Only Egg Me On)".

== Personal life ==
Three of his younger siblings died before him. His wife Jacinta was originally from Derry, and died in 2014 following a long period of suffering from Multiple sclerosis. Gallen admits to have entered a period of Depression during her illness and bereavement. The couple had three children, Rory, Trasa, Ciaran.

== Comedian ==
Following a robbery at the video shop he was working on, Gallen discovered the stock he had bought was itself stolen goods, and so not covered for insurance. Consequently, Gallen turned to entertainment, singing in a band called "the odd couple" and then towards comedy. Starting with small pub gigs, he moved to theatres with the support of Charlie McGettigan.

Following the unexpected absence of a sound tech at one performance, his 12-year-old son Rory took control of the decks, and has worked with him ever since. In 2013 he co-created a play with Rory called "A Bit On The Side".

Gallen has made numerous live appearances around Ireland, on both sides of the border, in venues such as The Millennium Forum, Derry and The Alley Theatre, Strabane. He has also released 20 DVDs and 40 CDs (2 of which are also on digital download), including the double-platinum selling Conal Gallen: Live & Full of It.

Conal made his first appearance on RTÉ's The Late Late Show in January 2012.

Speaking of Gallen, Fellow Ulsterman, Daniel O'Donnell said "I love Conal Gallen... I’ve seen him live lots of times and he has a good Irish humour. Sometimes I find today’s humour complicated and smart, but Conal’s is clear. You laugh as soon as you see him coming onstage."
