= Liscooley =

Townland in County Donegal, Ireland

Liscooley Lios Cúile Liscooly
- Townland
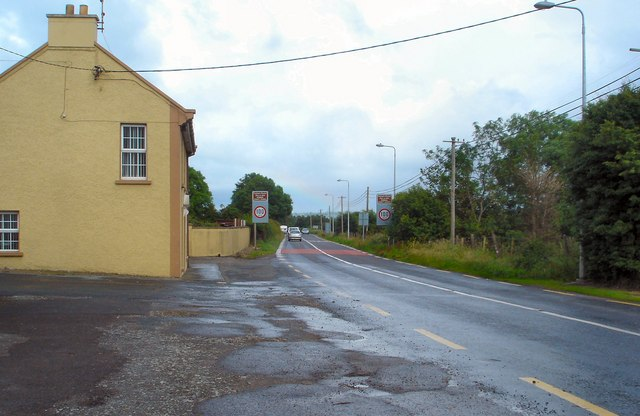
- Liscooley, Killygordon (N15)
- Interactive map of Liscooley
- Coordinates: 54°48′04″N 7°38′30″W
- Country: Ireland
- Province: Ulster
- County: County Donegal
- Region: Finn Valley
- Electoral division: Killygordon
- Time zone: GMT+1
- Postal code: F93

Liscooley or Liscooly (Irish: Lios Cúile) is a townland and small village in the Finn Valley in east County Donegal in Ireland. It is located within the electoral division of Killygordon on the N15 road between Stranorlar and Castlefin. It comes under the postal addresses of Killygordon and Castlefin and is within the civil parish of Donaghmore. As of the 2011 census, the townland of Liscooly had a population of 17 people.

== Name ==
Liscooley or Liscooly derives from the Irish Lios Cúile, which may mean the "ringfort of the corner" or the "ringfort of Cúile". The area was originally known as 'High Town' and 'Low Town'.

== History ==
Evidence of ancient settlement in the area includes a number of standing stone, court tomb and ringfort sites in the townlands of Liscooly, Carrick, Carricknashane and Magheraboy. Saint Bridget's holy well is located in the nearby townland of Kiltown.

Donoughmore Church, located in Carrick townland, is a Presbyterian church which was originally founded in 1658. The current church building was constructed in 1977. There is a graveyard alongside the church and Donoughmore National school is also nearby.

Berwick Hall, a detached three-bay single-storey over raised basement house built in 1760, is located in Low Town, Liscooly. It is set back from road in overgrown grounds to the south of Liscooly, and a short distance to the north of Liscooly Bridge.

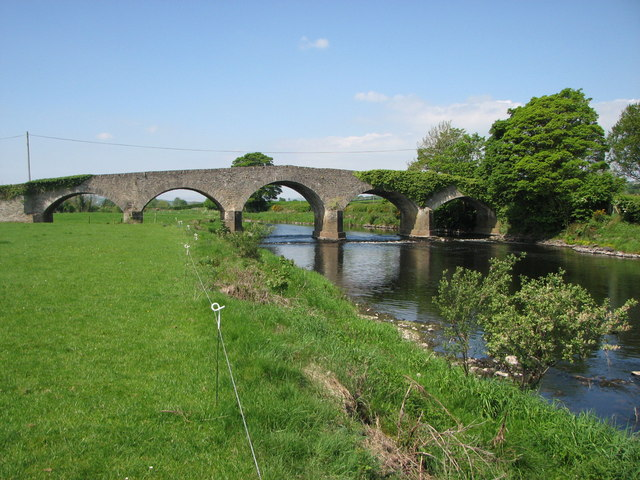
Liscooly Bridge was built c. 1801

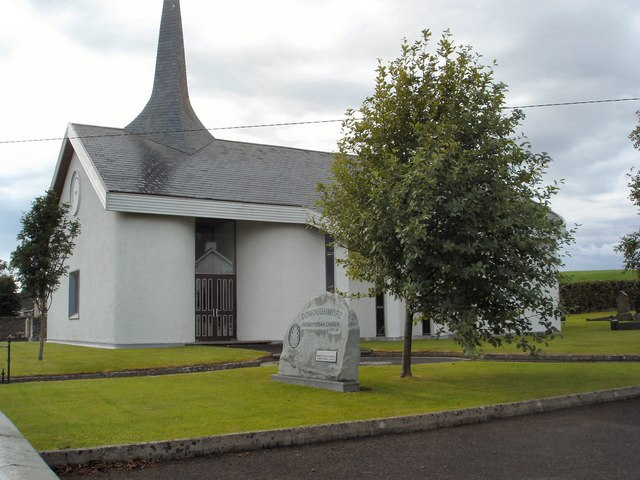
Donoughmore Presbyterian Church was built in 1977 to replace an earlier structure

Liscooly Bridge, which crosses the River Finn, is located at Low town and was built c. 1801.

J.Davis, a former shop associated with the Davis family, was based in a group of two-bay two-storey houses built in 1820. Located at Liscooly near Low town, one of the buildings was used as a retail outlet into the 20th century.

Liscooly railway station opened on the 7 September 1863, which stopped at High town, Liscooley. The station closed in January 1960 due to the closure of the Finn Valley railway line between Strabane and Stanorlar.

== Amenities ==
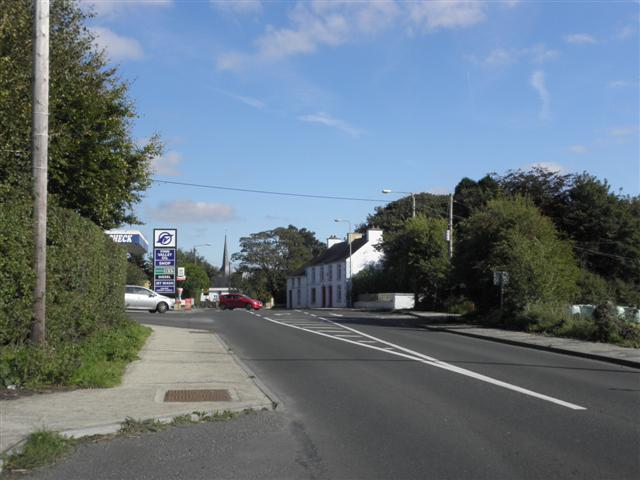
Byrne's Shop in Liscooley operated from 1918 to 2018 (to the left)

Byrne's shop and petrol station is in Carricknashane townland. Opened in 1918, Byrne's shop and LCC Oil Limited ultimately closed in 2018. 'Go Liscooly' subsequently opened there but only the petrol station remains. Since then, the village has not had a shop and Liscooley locals have shopped at the nearby town of Castlefin.

There is one housing estate in Liscooley, Liscooley Villas, which is located in Carricknashane townland.

Donaghmore Presbyterian church/meeting house is in Carricknashane townland (Low Town). The local Catholic parish church is St. Patrick's Church in Crossroads to the southwest of Killygordon.

== Education ==
Donoughmore National School, located within Carrick townland in Liscooley, is under the patronage of the local Presbyterian church. As of 2024, approximately 30 pupils were attending the school. Pupils from the primary school typically attend secondary school in Deele College, St. Columba's Collage or Finn Valley College.

== Public transport ==
There is a Bus Éireann stop in Liscooley. It serves several bus routes, including services to Ballybofey.

== Geography ==
=== Layout ===
The settlement at Liscooley is split into two areas: 'Low Town' is at the eastern end and 'High Town' is to the west.

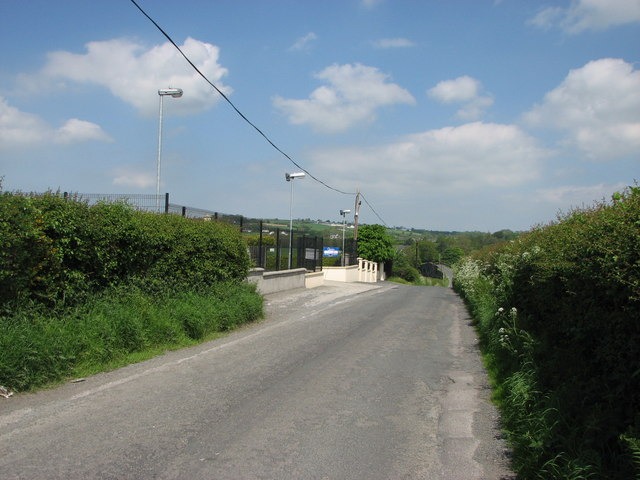
Lowtown, Liscooley, Killygordon

| Area (hamlet) | Townlands |
|---|---|
| High town | Carricknashane, Carrick, Magheraboy, Leaght, Scotland & Blairstown. |
| Low town (or Laytown) | Liscooly & Carranadore |
| Other | Kiltown |

=== Townlands and electoral divisions ===
Liscooley townland lies within the electoral division of Killygordon. Other neighbouring townlands (and their electoral divisions) include:

| Townland | Gaelige | Electoral Division | Postal Address |
|---|---|---|---|
| Carricknashane | Carraig na Seana | Killygordon ED | Carricknashane, Castlefin |
| Liscooly | Lios Cúile | Killygordon ED | Liscooley, Castlefin |
| Magheraboy | An Machaire Buí | Killygordon ED | Magheraboy, Killygordon |
| Carrick | Carraig | Killygordon ED | Carrick, Castlefin |
| Scotland | Albain | Killygordon ED | Scotland, Castlefin |
| Blairstown | ~ | Killygordon ED | Blairstown, Castlefin |
| Leaght | ~ | Killygordon ED | Leaght, Castlefin |
