= Donegal Harvest Rally =

The Donegal Harvest Rally (Irish: Rally an Fhómhair) is a motoring rally that takes place annually in County Donegal, Ireland. The rally is organised by the Donegal Motor Club takes place in Gweedore in the Donegal Gaeltacht.

The 2022 rally (the last of the National Rally Championship) was postponed following the Creeslough explosion.
