= Reelin River =

River in County Donegal, Ireland

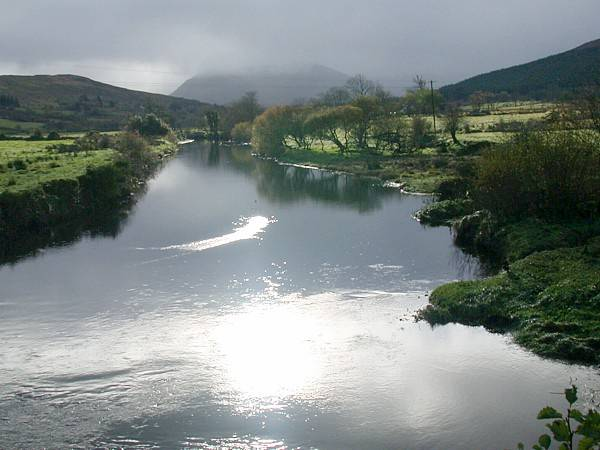
- The Reelin River

Location
- Country: Ireland
- County: County Donegal

Physical characteristics
- Mouth: River Finn
  - coordinates: 54°49.69788′N 7°56.29188′W

The Reelin River is a river which flows through Cloghan and Commeen (near Stranorlar) in County Donegal, Ireland. It is a tributary to the River Finn.
