= Tullaghan =

Village in County Leitrim, Ireland

Tullaghan An Tulachán (Irish)
- Village
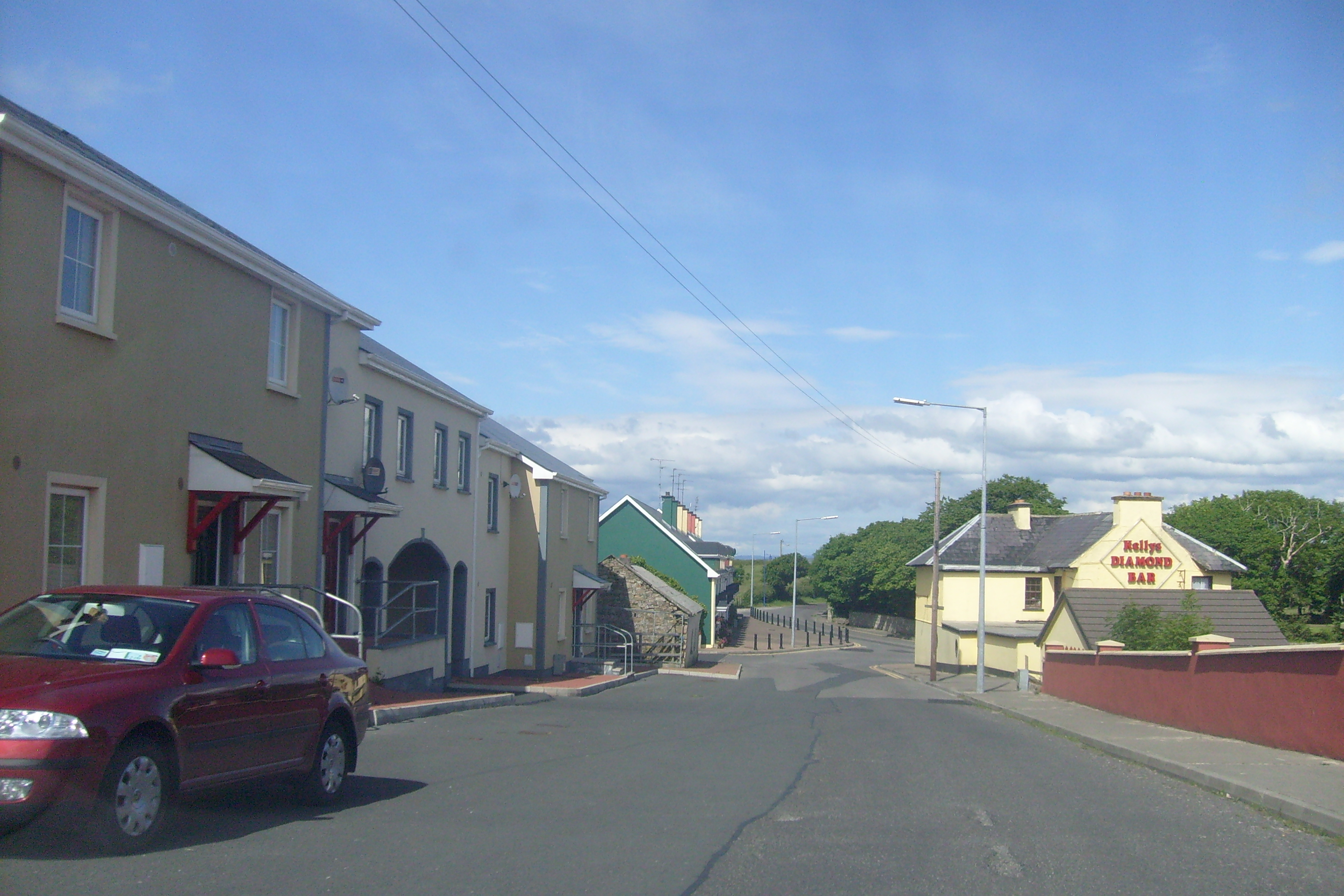
- Tullaghan village

- Location in Ireland
- Coordinates: 54°28′06″N 8°19′52″W
- Country: Ireland
- Province: Connacht
- County: County Leitrim

Area
  - Total: 0.53 km^{2} (0.20 sq mi)

Population (2016)
  - Total: 253
  - Density: 480/km^{2} (1,200/sq mi)
- Time zone: UTC+0 (WET)
  - Summer (DST): UTC-1 (IST (WEST))
- Irish Grid Reference: G785578

Tullaghan (Irish: An Tulachán) is the most northerly village in County Leitrim, Ireland. Lying at the northern end of Glenade, Tullaghan is in the parish of Kinlough and Glenade and is part of the Manorhamilton electoral area.

== Geography ==
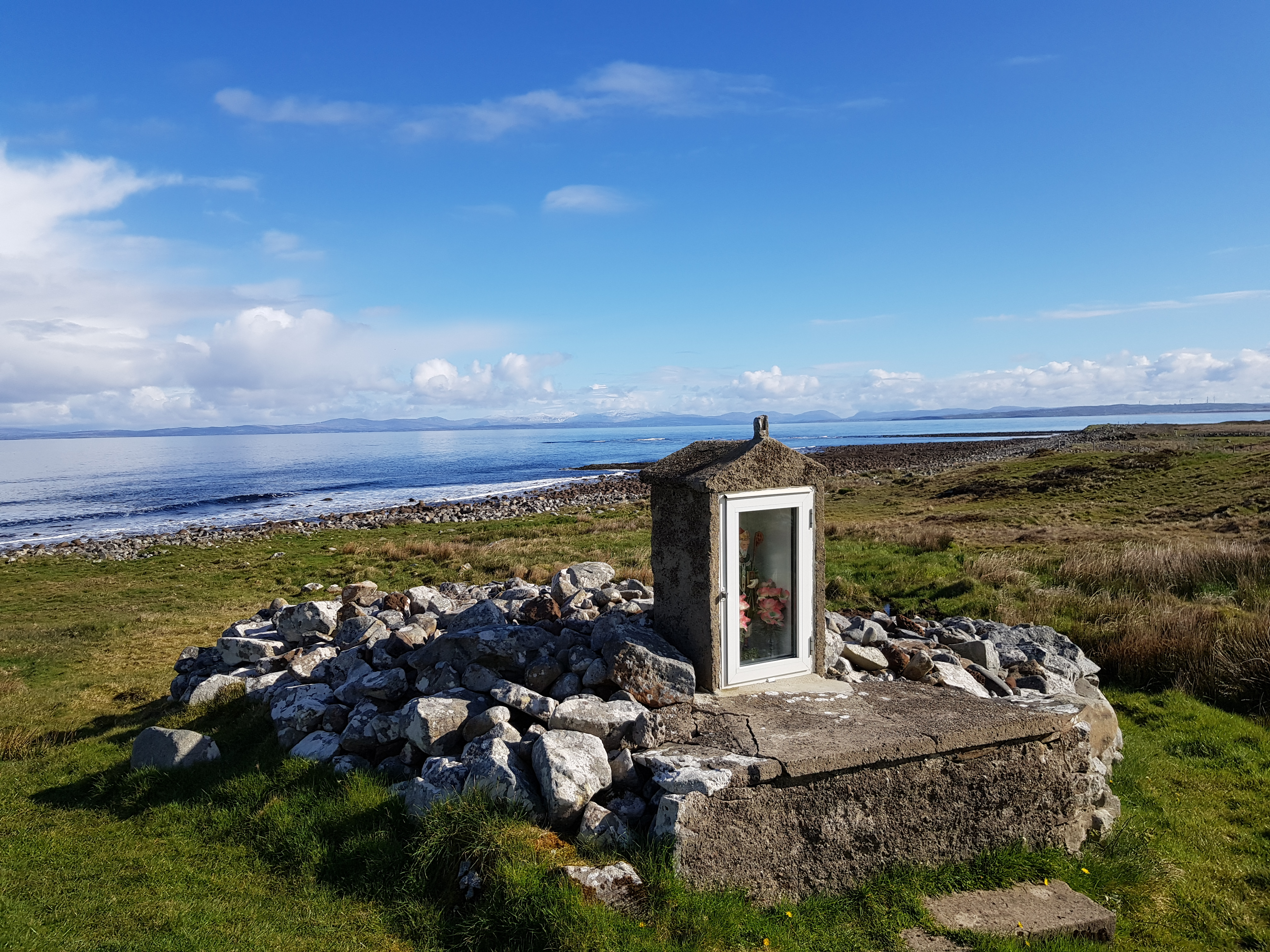
Leitrim coastline at St Patrick's Well, Tullaghan

Tullaghan is located on the N15 road between Sligo (35 km (22 mi)) and Bundoran, County Donegal (3 km (1.9 mi)). Tullaghan includes a small section of County Sligo and extends east to the edge of Lough Melvin and the Garrison lowlands, west to Bunduff strand (in the north Sligo coastal area) and south to the northern slopes of the Dartry Mountains and the Arroo and Mountain Outliers. The River Drowes denotes the border between County Leitrim and County Donegal and the River Duff forms the border between County Leitrim and County Sligo. The R280 road connects Tullaghan with the rest of County Leitrim. Tullaghan has the single shortest bit of county coastline in Ireland – a mere 4.7 kilometres (2.9 mi) long.

== History ==
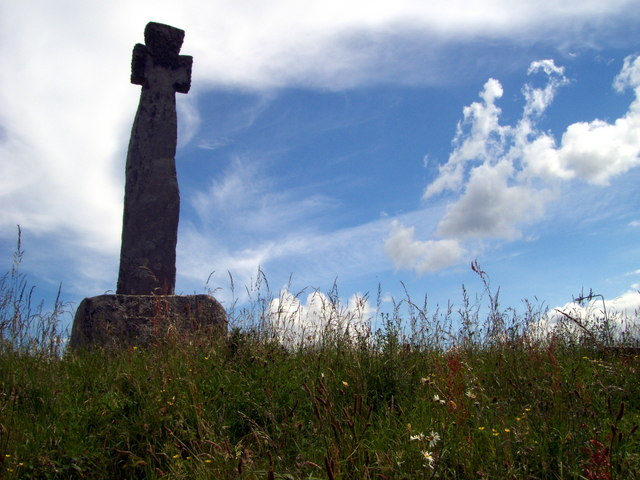
Tullaghan high cross

Tullaghan has a high cross located on the roadside of the N15, being erected in its current location in 1778. St Patricks Well is located approximately 3 km west from the village on the coast road past St Patricks church. Back in 1925, Tullaghan village comprised 19 houses, 5 being licensed to sell alcohol.

== Religion ==
Saint Patrick's Catholic Church was built in 1842.

== See also ==
- List of towns and villages in Ireland
