= Rathcormack =

Rathcormack Ráth Chormaic
- Village
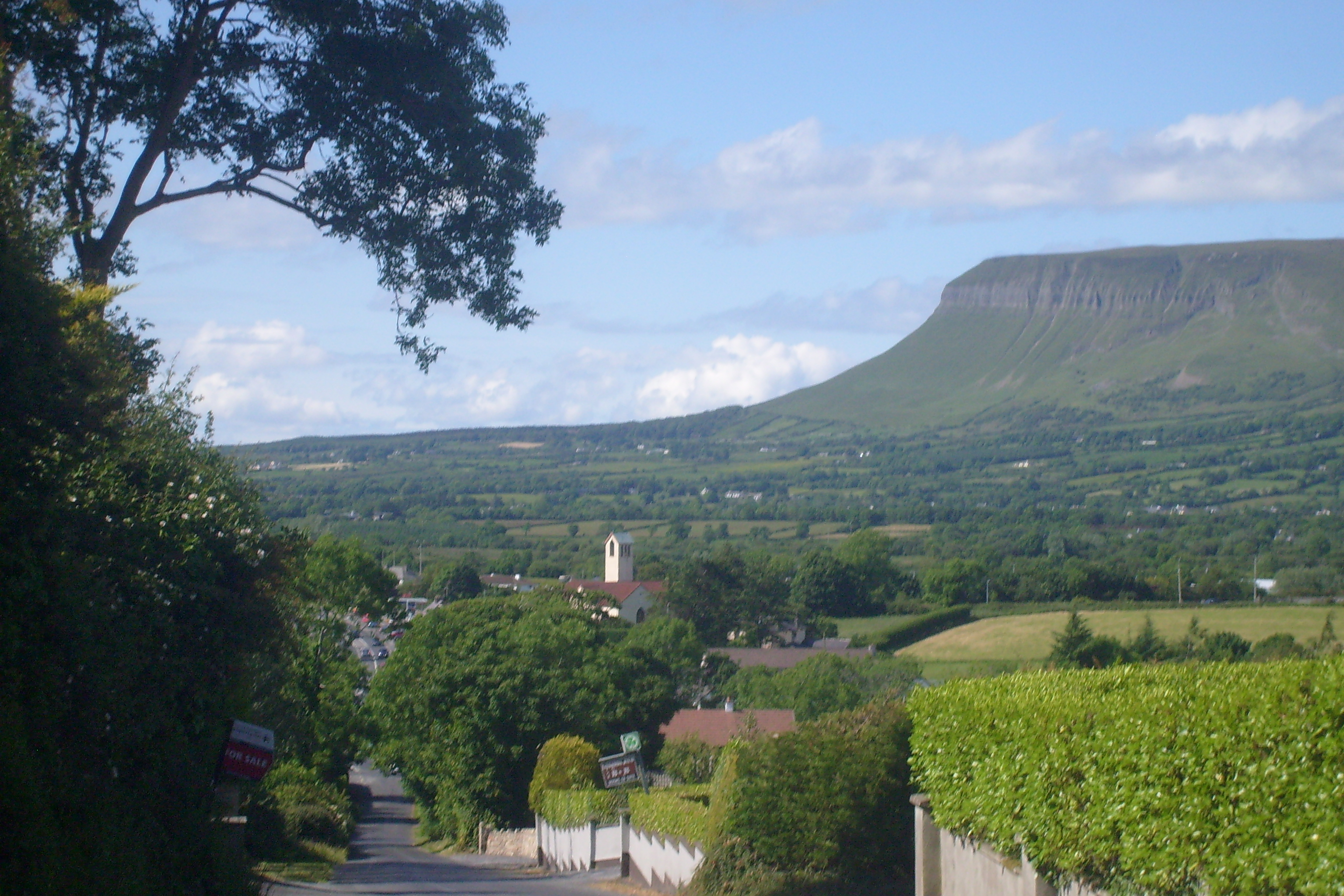
- Rathcormack village with Ben Bulben in the background

- Location in Ireland
- Coordinates: 54°19′05″N 8°28′48″W
- Country: Ireland
- Province: Connacht
- County: County Sligo
- Elevation: 8 m (26 ft)
- Time zone: UTC+0 (WET)
  - Summer (DST): UTC-1 (IST (WEST))
- Irish Grid Reference: G675428

Rathcormack or Rathcormac (Irish: Ráth Chormaic, meaning 'Cormac's rath, see ringfort') is a village in County Sligo, Ireland. It is 6 km north of Sligo town on the N15 road between Benbulbin mountain and the sea.

== Sean nós dance festival ==
There is an annual Sean nós dancing festival held in May, organised by the local Cos Cos Dance Company.

== See also ==
- List of towns and villages in Ireland
