= Letterkenny Regional Sports and Leisure Complex =

Sports complex in Letterkenny, Ireland

Coordinates: 54.945484°N 7.751369°W

- Interactive map of Letterkenny Regional Sports and Leisure Complex
- Address: Letterkenny, Ireland
- Capacity: 2500

Construction
- Built: 2002 - 2007
- Opened: 19 July 2007
- Architect: Holohan Architects

Letterkenny Regional Sports and Leisure Complex is a sports complex located in Letterkenny, County Donegal, Ireland. Located near O'Donnell Park, RTÉ Television has broadcast live from the venue on several occasions.

== Construction ==
Construction of the building began in 2002. The complex was meant to be finished construction in January 2007 but was not completed until four months later. Total cost of the building of the complex was €22.7 million. An open day for the complex was held on 18 and 19 May 2007, with the complex opened to the public on Monday 9 July 2007.

== Facilities ==
The complex

The Aura Management Company operate the centre.

The complex includes a 25m (6 lane) swimming pool, a gym, a 2,500 seat sports hall, an athletic track (named after Danny McDaid), soccer pitch, children's play area and skate park.

The sports complex caters for indoor soccer, badminton, basketball, volleyball, aerobics, athletics, swimming, and gymnastics.

== Performance history ==
Riverdance performed in the Sports Complex on 24 and 25 May 2007, an event which marked the official opening of the centre. Around 12,000 people attended. Due to the success of these performances, Riverdance announced a return to the venue, for five shows from Thursday 22 through to Sunday 25 May 2008.

Daniel O'Donnell began his Irish summer tour with a show at the Complex on 14 July 2007. He was joined by his touring partner Mary Duff. The concert was filmed as a Daniel television special and also as a DVD later released.

RTÉ's Tubridy Tonight broadcast from the venue on 15 December 2007 for his annual Christmas show. Guests on the show were supermodel Janice Dickinson, Derry boxer John Duddy, Italia 90 trio Packie Bonner, Andy Townsend and John Aldridge and The X Factor winner Shane Ward. Music on the night was provided by Phil Coulter, Paul Brady and Eleanor McEvoy, who sang "Fairytale of New York".

Hunky Dorys Fight Night came to the complex on 29 March 2008. Undefeated Paul McCloskey took on former World Champion Cesar Bazan. McCloskey beat Bezan over 10 rounds by 100 to 90 points. The first bout was at 6.30pm and McCloskey came into the ring at 9.30pm. The match was broadcast on RTÉ.

The complex hosted the Tug of War International Federation (TWIF)'s World Tug of War Championships in February 2020.

On 30 January 2023 a benefit concert for the Creeslough explosion featured Brian McFadden and Keith Duffy, Lisa McHugh, Brian Kennedy, and local school choirs.

== Controversies ==
The opening proved controversial as many local politicians believed the old leisure centre located on the High Road should be closed to facilitate the building of a new courthouse. Local residents and businessmen thought differently, and staged protests against the closing of the centre. Local politicians decided on 14 May 2007 to close the old leisure centre, with the deciding vote coming from Ciaran Brogan.

On 19 October 2007, the Aura Management Company confirmed the pool and health suite at the facility was to close temporarily with immediate effect due to work being carried out to correct tiles around the pool, which were deemed to be too slippery. The centre re-opened on a week later.

The seating arrangements of the theatre area was criticised by many Riverdance attendants who complained that they could not see the show.

On 20 April 2019, a "major incident" was declared at the leisure centre after children became ill during a swimming lesson. The incident occurred on the Easter Saturday of a busy bank holiday weekend. Doctors and nurses rushed to the scene to tend to the sick, the closest hospital activated its emergency plan and the building was evacuated. There were reports of children "screaming" and a parent who witnessed the event from the viewing gallery stated that "a green liquid spray[ed] into the pool". One mother, whose son was infected, said "he saw a dark brown fluid coming out in the pool under water" and described the children as "sick, coughing and vomiting". According to emergency services, the incident proved to be "very serious" and children required hospital treatment, with some of those affected being admitted intensive care. However, the Aura Management Company had released a statement claiming this was a "minor incident". Aura staff we praised for their reactions during the incident and for evacuating the centre immediately. The Aura Management Company mistakenly claimed on social media that all children had been released from hospital that night - however this had not been the case.

Less than two weeks after the swimming pool incident, the facility was burgled.
