= N15 road (Ireland) =

Road in Ireland

N15 road
- Bóthar N15

Route information
- Length: 110.99 km (68.97 mi)

Location
- Country: Ireland
- Primary destinations: (bypassed routes in italics): County Donegal; Lifford*; Castlefin*; Liscooley*; Killygordon*; Stranorlar*; Ballybofey*; Donegal; Laghey; Ballintra; Ballyshannon; Bundoran; County Leitrim; Tullaghan; Kinlough; County Sligo; Mullaghmore (R279); Cliffoney*; Grange*; Drumcliff*; Rathcormack*; Sligo; *bypass planned

Highway system
- Roads in Ireland; Motorways; Primary; Secondary; Regional

The N15 road is a national primary road in the north-west of Ireland. It runs from Sligo to Lifford, County Donegal. It forms part of the proposed Atlantic Corridor route. It also goes to the border with Northern Ireland.

== Route ==
The N15 commences halfway across Lifford Bridge (which crosses the River Foyle between County Donegal and County Tyrone), continuing the route of the A38 (from Strabane on the east side of the river). In Lifford, west of the River Foyle, the N14 meets the N15, ending at a junction in the town centre. The N15 leaves to the southwest, changing to run west at the point just west of Clady. It continues west through Castlefin, Liscooley and Killygordon to reach Stranorlar.

In Stranorlar, the N13 commences, leaving the N15 to head north, with the N15 itself turning southwest to cross the River Finn to enter Ballybofey. From here, it continues southwest through the mountains and Barnesmore Gap (passing southeast of the Bluestack Mountains) towards Donegal Town. East of the town itself, the N56 road starts at a junction on the N15 and runs around the north of the town and is the main coastal route for County Donegal, with the N15 then turning to the south, to bypass the eastern side of Donegal Town. The N15 crosses the Drumenny Burn on the eastern outskirts of Donegal Town.

South of Donegal Town, the N15 passes by Ballintra to the west. Further south, the route follows a road opened in 2006, bypassing Ballyshannon to the east and crossing the River Erne on a viaduct.

The road enters County Leitrim directly west of Bundoran (the bypass passes south of the town). Tullaghan is the only village along the N15 in the county, also bypassed.

The N15 runs closer to the coastline in County Sligo, passing through Cliffoney and Grange as it proceeds southwest. The road then passes through the villages of Drumcliff and Rathcormack before entering Sligo. The route ends at the start of the N4, which continues through the town as the Sligo Inner Relief Road dual carriageway.

== Planned and completed upgrades ==
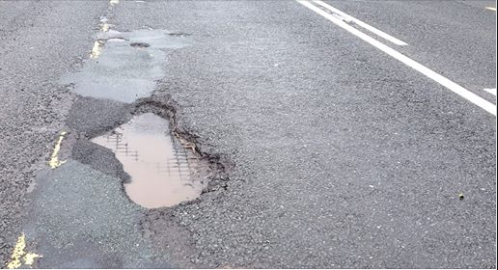
Pothole on the N15 near Castlegal school

The 20 km (12 mi) route between Lifford and Stranorlar is a single carriageway road of very poor quality. A replacement of the current alignment with a new single carriageway road is planned, bypassing Castlefin, Liscooley, and Killygordon. This will connect with a 16 km (10 mi) 2+1 bypass of Stranorlar and Ballybofey which is also planned. This will bypass the towns to the south, with a new crossing of the River Finn.

The N15 runs for over 26 km (16 mi) in County Sligo, passing north of the Dartry Mountains and around Benbulbin before passing Drumcliff Bay to enter Sligo Town. A bypass of the entire route was planned, with dual carriageway for at least part of the route. A route had been selected for the project, with the new road to run closer to the mountains and the bay than the existing N15. However, the National Roads Authority (NRA) didn't give funding for the road and the project was suspended The local radio station in the north-west, Ocean FM had a special report in 2017 on how the road in Sligo needs to be upgraded in the wake of three crashes on this stretch of road in less than two weeks.

Instead of a completely new route, the NRA and Transport Infrastructure Ireland (TII) began a project called the N4-N15 Urban Improvements Scheme starting with the widening of Hughes Bridge in Sligo to a six-lane bridge and progressed as a Minor Improvement Scheme from 2015 through to mid-2016 costing about €2.5 Million. The project was completed on 17 July 2016

Continuing with the N4-N15 Urban Improvements, in August 2019, it was announced that €14 Million had been allocated for a 730-metre upgrade from Hughes Bridge to just past the N4-N15-N16 junction. It would include a six-lane carriageway, improved cycle paths and footpaths, LED streetlights, upgrades on Copper Bridge on the N15, and a major redesign of the R291 (Rosses Point) junction. Work was originally supposed to take 12 months, from August 2019 to the autumn of 2020. The finish date was then extended to spring 2021, but the project continued as of June 2021.

A major repaving of the road from Creevykeel crossroads to Castlegal was started in mid-October 2019 and was very nearly complete before Ireland's Covid-19 lockdown. They returned in late May to put the finishing touches on the road. The road improvements included lowering the speed limit at Creevykeel crossroads to 60 km/h. Despite these improvements, the road from Castelgal to the Sligo county boundary was still in bad condition with locals calling for the whole road to be repaved.

In September 2020, Ocean FM Reported that TII allocated between 3 and 4 million Euros to upgrade a 3.5 km-long stretch of road between Grange and the townland of Cashelgarran at Henrys Restaurant. It would include rebuilding, strengthening and repaving the stretch of road.

== See also ==
- Regional road
- Roads in Ireland
