= Doneyloop =

Doneyloop Dún na Lúb
- Hamlet
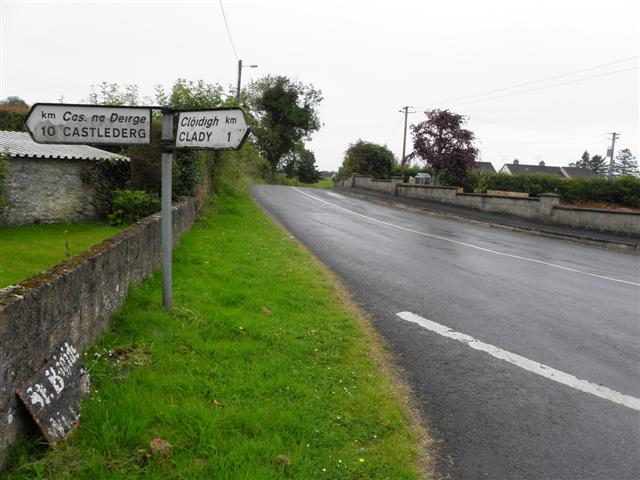
- Doneyloop, Castlefin
- Interactive map of Doneyloop
- Coordinates: 54°47′11″N 7°33′28″W
- Country: Ireland
- Province: Ulster
- County: County Donegal
- Region: Finn Valley
- Civil parish: Urney

Area
  - Total: 0.1497 km^{2} (0.0578 sq mi)

Population
  - Total: 32
- (2011 census; Dunnaloob townland)
  - Summer (DST): GMT+1
- Postal code: F93

Doneyloop (Irish: Dún na Lúb, meaning 'fort of the river bend'), sometimes spelt Dunnyloop or Dunnaloob, is a townland and hamlet near Castlefin in the Finn Valley of east County Donegal in Ireland. It is located on the Urney Road in the civil parish of Urney. The village of Clady, County Tyrone, in Northern Ireland, is nearby. Dunnaloob townland is in the electoral division of Urney West.

== History ==
Saint Bridget's holy well, located at Cormakilly near Donneyloop, is a religious site historically associated with Saint Bridget.

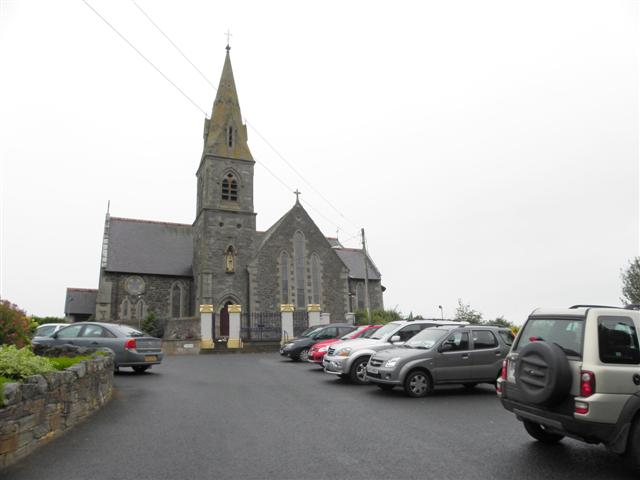
Saint Columba's Church, Doneyloop, near Castlefin

St. Columba's Church, located at Dunnaloob in Urney West, is a Catholic church built in 1868 and designed by John O'Neill. It is within the Roman Catholic Diocese of Derry and is part of the Urney and Castlefin parish along with Saint Mary's Church in Castlefin.

== Amenities ==
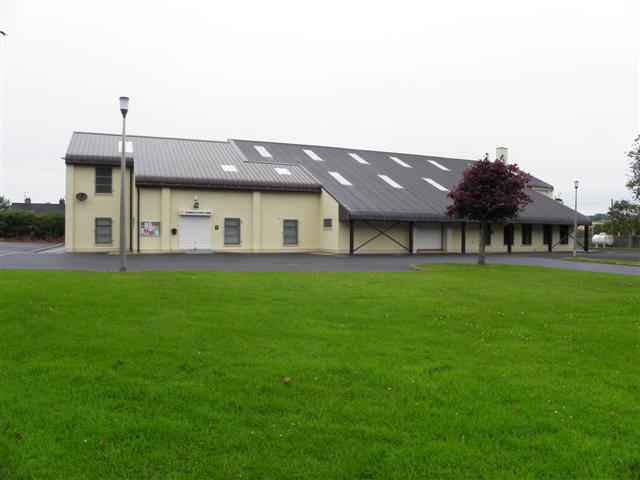
Doneyloop Community Centre

Doneyloop Community Centre and Youth Club, located at Dunnaloob in Urney West, offers the hall for the Urney parish and kitchen. The youth club offers: sports, arts and crafts, quizzes and trips.

There is one housing estate in Doneyloop, the Doneyloop Estate is located at Dunnaloob, Castlefin. It has eleven houses and is named after Saint Columba.

The local national (primary) school, Saint Safan's National School, is located at Drumdoit.

== Geography ==
Townlands in the area, within Urney West Electoral Division, include:

Doneyloop Townlands
Townland	Gaelige	Electoral Division
Dunnaloob	Dún na Lúb	Urney West ED
Roganspark	Páirc Uí Rógáin	Urney West ED
Magherycallaghan	Machaire Uí Cheallacháin	Urney West ED
Drumdoit	Droim Doit	Urney West ED
Cormakilly	Chormaic Cille	Urney West ED
Foyfin	Faiche Fionn	Urney West ED
Millfarm	Feirm an mhuilinn	Urney West ED
Halftown	Leathbhaile	Urney West ED
Drumnaha	Droim na hÁtha	Urney West ED
Drumbane	An Drom Bán	Urney West ED
Graffy	An Ghrafaidh	Urney West ED
Gortakilly	Gort na Coille	Urney West ED
Tullyard	Tulaigh Árd	Urney West ED
Skelpy	Sceilpigh	Urney West ED

The townland of Dunnaloob is spelt differently from the hamlet name. However, many people and the local road signs give Doneyloop as the name of the area.
