= National Rally Championship =

Rallying series in the Republic of Ireland

- Category: Rallying
- Country: Ireland
- Inaugural season: 1966
- Drivers' champion: (Republic of Ireland) Josh Moffett (2019)
- Official website: Website

The National Rally Championship is a rallying series in the Republic of Ireland. It consists series of events, organized by a different motor club representing the region. The championship consists of eight events that runs in 16 locations switching biennially.

The championship is regulated by Motorsport Ireland who are the governing body of Motorsports in the Republic of Ireland.

For sponsorship reasons the series were called Dunlop National Rally Championship between 2011 and 2014, and Triton National Rally Championship between 2015 and 2020.

== Seasons ==
=== 2022 ===
==== Calendar ====
Round	Dates	Event	Rally HQ	Organizer
1	6 March	Mayo Rally	Achill Island	Mayo & District Motor Club
2	3 April	Birr Rally	Birr	Birr & District Motor Club
3	24 April	Monaghan Rally	Monaghan	Monaghan Motor Club
4	15 May	Carlow Rally	Carlow	Carlow Motor Club
5	5 June	Circuit of Munster	Limerick	Limerick Motor Club
6	17 July	Tipperary Stonethrowers Rally	Clonmel	Tipperary Motor Club
7	28 August	Galway Summer Rally	Galway	Galway Motor Club
8	8 October	Donegal Harvest Rally	Ballybofey	Donegal Motor Club

==== Results ====
Round	Winner
1	Josh Moffett/Keith Moriarty (Hyundai i20 R5)
2	Josh Moffett/Keith Moriarty (Hyundai i20 R5)
3	Josh Moffett/Jason McKenna (Hyundai i20 R5)
4	Josh Moffett/Keith Moriarty (Hyundai i20 R5)
5	Josh Moffett/Keith Moriarty (Hyundai i20 R5)

=== 2021 ===
The season was cancelled due to COVID-19 pandemic.

=== 2020 ===
At the 2019 awards ceremony on 16 November it was announced that 2020 championship will consist of seven rounds, six of which will be counting rounds. The change in biennial calendar is the drop of Sligo Rally in September and return of Carlow Rally in May.

The important championship sponsorship was offered to Triton Showers to extended for another year. Initially committed for five years term, Triton Showers agreed to remain as title sponsors for another year.

On 12 March all motorsports events were postponed in the light of the coronavirus pandemic. On 20 March, Motorsport Ireland issued a statement that all motorsport events are suspended until 1 June 2020. After the government released a road map on easing the COVID-19 restrictions on 6 May, Motorsport Ireland released a statement same day that in line with Phase 4 of this road map the suspension of all motor sports events is extended until the 20 July 2020. Rally events fall under Phase 5 of the guidelines and will not be considered until after the 10 August 2020. On 19 May Motorsport Ireland cancelled the 2020 championship. Clubs might still be able to run events if they wish but it won't hold championship status.

Only the round 1 took place before rounds 2-5 were postponed, and eventually all remaining rounds were cancelled.

==== Calendar ====
2020 event calendar before cancellation
Round	Dates	Event	Rally HQ	Organizer
1	8 March	Mayo Rally	Achill Island	Mayo & District Motor Club
2	5 April cancelled	Circuit of Kerry Rally	Tralee	Kerry Motor Club
3	10 May cancelled	Carlow Rally	Carlow	Carlow Motor Club
4	24 May cancelled	Cavan Rally	Cavan	Cavan Motor Club
5	9 August cancelled	Tipperary Stonethrowers Rally	Clonmel	Tipperary Motor Club
6	13 September cancelled	Clare Rally	Sligo	Clare Motor Club
7	10 October cancelled	Donegal Harvest Rally	Ballybofey	Donegal Motor Club

=== 2019 ===
The 2019 season was launched on 26 January in Mondello Park, sponsored by Triton for the fifth year in a row. The calendar, consisting of the same eight biennial events was announced. The best seven scores will count, in addition, the final two rounds will offer bonus points.

==== Awards ====
There will be overall awards and awards for each of the 20 classes. Other awards include the Motorsport Safety Team Group N award, the rally.ie award (highest two-wheel drive in overall classification) and the Mk. 2 Champions Trophy. The Juniors will compete for Junior Trophy (Class 16A) and the National Junior Award (Class 16), with the winner qualifying for selection process for the Billy Coleman Young Rally Driver of the Year award. Navigators will participate in separate scoring and will be also awarded.

==== Broadcasting ====
The TV coverage is captured by On the Limit Sports. The viewers can view the series on TG4 and RTE Player in Ireland, as well as on satellite channel, YouTube and Motorsport.tv.

Participating Classes
Class	Group	Description
Class 1	N	up to 1600cc (previously N1 & N2)
Class 1	R1	up to 1390cc - VR1A; 1390-1600 cc - VR1B
Class 2	A	up to 1600cc (previously A5 & A6)
Class 2	R2	1390-1600 cc - VR2B
Class 2	Kit cars	up to 1600cc
Class 2	N	1601-2000 cc (previously N3)
Class 3	A	1601-2000 cc
Class 3	R2	1601-2000 cc - VR2C
Class 3	R3	atmospheric 1601-2000 cc - VR3C turbo up to 1620cc nominal - VR3T diesel up to 2000cc nominal - VR3D
Class 3	Super 1600	Super 1600 rally homologation
Class 4	N	over 2000 cc (N4 FIA Appendix J254)
Class 5	R4	FIA Appendix J260
Class 5	R5	all R5
Class 5	S2000	Super 2000 Rally (atmospheric)
Class 6	R-GT	FIA R-GT homologation
Class 7	A	over 2000 cc (previously A8)
Class 7	WRC	1.6T, 2.0T
Class 7	S2000	S2000 Rally 1.6T 30 mm Restrictor (also known as Regional Rally Car - RRC)
Class 9	Modified	Modified cars up to 1450 cc, 2 wheel drive
Class 10	Modified	Modified cars 1451 to 1650 cc, not more than 2 valves per cylinder, 2 wheel drive
Class 11F	Modified FWD	Modified FWD cars 1451 to 1650 cc, more than 2 valves per cylinder, 2 wheel drive
Class 11R	Modified RWD	Modified RWD cars 1451 to 1650 cc, more than 2 valves per cylinder
Class 13	Modified	Modified cars 1651 to 2100 cc, more than 2 valves per cylinder, 2 wheel drive
Class 14	Modified	Modified cars 2101 to 3500 cc, 2 wheel drive Max 2 valves per cylinder over 3000 cc
Class 15	4WD	Four-wheel drive cars whose homologation has expired
Class 16	Juniors	Appendix 29.1 Article 21
Class 18	Historics	Articles 17–19, Appendix 29.1
Class 19	Historics	Appendix K
Class 20	Modified	Modified Four-wheel drive Cars

==== Calendar ====
Round	Dates	Event	Rally HQ	Organizer
1	24 February	Abbeyleix Manor Hotel Rally	Abbeyleix	Birr & District Motor Club
2	24 March	Midland Rally	Longford	Midland Motor Club
3	28 April	Monaghan Rally	Monaghan	Monaghan Motor Club
4	2 June	Circuit of Munster	Limerick	Limerick Motor Club
5	30 June	Raven’s Rock Rally	Waterford	Carrick-On-Suir Motor Club
6	14 July	Sligo Rally	Sligo	Connacht Motor Club
7	25 August	Galway Summer Rally	Galway	Galway Motor Club
8	27 October	Fastnet Rally	Skibbereen	Skibbereen & District Car Club

==== Results ====
A total of 113 competitors have participated in at least one championship event.

Top 10 drivers overall:

Pos	Driver	Car	Class	1	2	3	4	5	6	7	8	Points
1	Josh Moffet	Ford Fiesta RS WRC	7	20	21	18	21	20	21	22	#	143
2	Roy White	Ford Fiesta RS WRC	7	16	18	16	16	19	18	0	#	103
3	Kevin Eves	Toyota Corolla AE86	14	9	11	11	0	#	16	0	15	62
4	David Moffett	Toyota Starlet RWD	13	5	7	8	0	#	14	#	21	55
5	Shane Maguire	Mitsubishi Lancer Evo IX	4	3	5	5	#	14	12	14	#	52
6	Declan Boyle	Ford Fiesta RS WRC	7	19	0	14	18	#	#	#	#	51
7	Aaron McLaughlin	Mitsubishi Lancer Evo IX	4	1	3	1	#	16	11	2	16	49
8	JF Shovelin	Ford Escort MK2	14	1	9	1	6	#	0	13	18	48
9	Kevin Barrett	Subaru Impreza S14 WRC	7	1	#	6	9	#	#	12	14	42
10	Peadar Hurson	Ford Fiesta RS WRC	7	14	16	#	#	10	#	#	#	40

- Note: # - did not start

=== 2018 ===
ALMC Stages Rally event originally scheduled on 15 July was cancelled prior to season start as the ALMC felt that there is lack of commitment to the event from the rally drivers, because there are too many rallies in June - July period. ALMC Stages Rally event was taking place since 1984.

Sligo Rally was admitted to the calendar instead, but rescheduled from 15 to 8 of July due to 'exceptional weather conditions' and fears that the heat will melt the road surface. However the heatwave persisted and this date was also cancelled. Eventually the rally took place on 2 September.

Carlow Mini Stages Rally organized by Carlow Motor Club and held on 20 May was not a championship counting round. Best five rounds out of seven counted towards championship title.

==== Calendar ====
Round	Dates	Event	Rally HQ	Organizer
1	11 March	Mayo Rally	Achill Island	Mayo & District Motor Club
2	8 April	Circuit of Kerry Rally	Tralee	Kerry Motor Club
3	27 May	Cavan Rally	Cavan	Cavan Motor Club
4	12 August	Tipperary Stonethrowers Rally	Sligo	Tipperary Motor Club
5	2 September	Sligo Rally	Clonmel	Connacht Motor Club
6	16 September	Clare Rally	Sligo	Clare Motor Club
7	13 October	Donegal Harvest Rally	Ballybofey	Donegal Motor Club

==== Results ====
Top 10 drivers overall:

Pos	Driver	Car	Class	1	2	3	4	5	6	7	Points
1	Declan Boyle	Ford Fiesta WRC	7	21	19	0	14	19	18	14	105
2	Josh Moffett	Ford Fiesta WRC	7	18	20	0	20	#	21	20	99
3	Joseph McGonigle	Mini John Cooper Works WRC	20	14	16	21	16	14	14	#	95
4	Chris Armstrong	Ford Escort Mk2	14	9	0	14	12	10	8	12	65
5	Donagh Kelly	Ford Fiesta WRC	7	8	14	#	19	20	#	#	61
6	Roy White	Ford Fiesta WRC	7	0.5	9	#	#	16	16	19	61
7	Stuart Darcy	Darrian T90 GTR	14	11	12	0	0	11	12	11	47
8	Kevin Barrett	Subaru Impreza WRC S14	7	7	11	#	#	8	10	9	45
9	Aidan Wray	Mitsubishi Lancer Evo X	4	12	0	16	13	0	#	#	41
10	Johnny Jordan	Toyota Starlet	13	#	#	18	0	#	11	10	39

- Note: # - did not start
