= Mayo Rally =

- Category: Rally
- Inaugural season: 1983
- Drivers' champion: (Republic of Ireland) Donagh Kelly
- Co-Drivers' champion: (Republic of Ireland) Conor Foley; Volkswagen Polo GTI R5

Irish Tarmac Rally Championship

Border Rally Championship

Mayo Rally
- Dates: March 8, 2020
- Frequency: Annual
- Location: County Mayo
- Country: Ireland
- Most recent: 2020
- Organiser: Mayo & District Motor Club
- Sponsor: TF RoyalHotel & Theatre; Casey's Mulroy's Londis

The Mayo Stages Rally, Mayo Rally is an annual motorsport rallying event run by the Mayo & District Motor Club and held in County Mayo in Ireland.

== History ==
The Mayo Stages Rally was first held in 1983. Niall Maguire holds the honor of the most rally wins - 4. Most stage wins was achieved by Declan Boyle - 25.

== 2020 ==
Mayo & District Motorsport Club returned to Castlebar for the first time since 2009. The two previous events in 2017 and 2018 took place in Achill. There was no event in 2019. The 2020 event consisted of three stages run three times located in the Castlebar and Westport areas, covering 114.45 km (71.12 mi) of special stage distance and 168.81 km (104.89 mi) liaison. The event was round 1 of the Triton Showers National Rally Championship and Sligo Pallets Border Rally Championship. Under direction of Clerk of the course David Breen, it was agreed that all cars be fitted with safety tracker system (STS) equipment as mandatory. Motorsport Ireland have brought a new rule in relation to the use of the STS at the beginning of the season. The event featured Junior Rally and Historic Rally classes, and also operated Rally 2 (Restart after retirement). The entry fee was announced to have been reduced to €770 to boost entries. There were 80 starters, 55 cars have completed the rally.

The event took place in heavy rain in the aftermath of Storm Jorge which made it difficult. The second stage was cancelled due to a local issue. The drama developed in the penultimate stage. At the final service Moffett's lead was 21.6 seconds ahead of Kelly with Hurson another nine seconds adrift. Josh Moffett stopped after the finish with fuel pressure problems with his Hyundai i20 R5 and Peadar Hurson rolled his Ford Fiesta WRC in the final loop of stage 8. Donagh Kelly went on to claim the victory.

== 2021 ==
The 2020 Mayo Rally was the last rally event that took place before the COVID-19 pandemic lockdown came into effect on the 12 March 2020. The 2021 event did not take place due to ongoing pandemic.

== 2022 ==
Mayo Stages Rally 2022 was the opening round of Motorsport Ireland National Irish Rally Championship, as well as counting round of Sligo Pallets Border Rally Championship, Top Part West Coast Rally Championship and Motorsport Ireland Junior Rally Series. Rally consisted of 8 stages spanning 93.81 km of competitive racing in the vicinity of Claremorris, Ballyhaunis and Cloonfad.

== Roll of Honor ==
Rally winners
Year	Driver	Co-driver	Car
2026	(Republic of Ireland) David Kelly	(Republic of Ireland) Patrick McCrudden	Skoda Fabia RS Rally2
2024	(Republic of Ireland) Sam Moffett	(Republic of Ireland) James O'Reilly	Hyundai I20 R5
2022	(Republic of Ireland) Josh Moffett	(Republic of Ireland) Keith Moriarty	Hyundai i20 R5
2021	no event - COVID-19 pandemic		
2020	(Republic of Ireland) Donagh Kelly	(Republic of Ireland) Conor Foley	Volkswagen Polo GTI R5
2018	(Republic of Ireland) Declan Boyle	(Republic of Ireland) James O'Reilly	Ford Fiesta RS WRC
2017	(Republic of Ireland) Joseph McGonigle	(Republic of Ireland) Ciaran Geaney	Škoda Fabia R5
2016	(United Kingdom) Garry Jennings	(Republic of Ireland) Rory Kennedy	Subaru Impreza S12B WRC '07
2015	(Republic of Ireland) Niall Maguire	(Republic of Ireland) Enda Sherry	Subaru Impreza S11 WRC '05
2014	(Republic of Ireland) Declan Boyle	(Republic of Ireland) Brian Boyle	Subaru Impreza S12B WRC '07
2013	(Republic of Ireland) Declan Boyle	(Republic of Ireland) Brian Boyle	Subaru Impreza S12B WRC '07
2012	(Republic of Ireland) Niall Maguire	(Republic of Ireland) Enda Sherry	Subaru Impreza S11 WRC '05
2011	(Republic of Ireland) Kevin Barrett	(Republic of Ireland) Sean Mullally	Subaru Impreza S11 WRC '05
2010	(United Kingdom) Melvyn Evans	(United Kingdom) Patrick Walsh	Subaru Impreza S12B WRC '07
2009	(Republic of Ireland) Patrick Elliott	(Republic of Ireland) Paul Goodman	Subaru Impreza S12B WRC '07
2008	(Republic of Ireland) Aaron MacHale	(Republic of Ireland) Killian Duffy	Ford Focus RS WRC '04
2007	(Republic of Ireland) Ray Breen	(Republic of Ireland) Damien Morrissey	Ford Focus RS WRC '04
2006	(United Kingdom) Charlie Donnelly	(United Kingdom) Paddy Toner	Toyota Corolla WRC
2005	(United Kingdom) James Harrison	(United Kingdom) Harvey Bell	Subaru Impreza S9 WRC '03
2004	(Republic of Ireland) Niall Maguire	(Republic of Ireland) Paul McLoughlin	Subaru Impreza S8 WRC '02
2003	(United Kingdom) Eugene Donnelly	(Republic of Ireland) Paul Kiely	Subaru Impreza S4 WRC '98
2002	(Republic of Ireland) Niall Maguire	(Republic of Ireland) Paul McLoughlin	Subaru Impreza S5 WRC '99
2001	no event, Foot-and-mouth outbreak		
2000	(United Kingdom) Andrew Nesbitt	(Republic of Ireland) James O'Brien	Subaru Impreza S4 WRC '98
1999	(United Kingdom) Ian Greer	(United Kingdom) Dean Beckett	Toyota Celica GT-Four (ST205)
1998	(United Kingdom) Ian Greer	(United Kingdom) Dean Beckett	Toyota Celica Turbo 4WD (ST185)
1997	(United Kingdom) John Gilleece	(United Kingdom) Michael Gibson	Ford Escort RS Cosworth
1996	(Republic of Ireland) Stephen Murphy	(Republic of Ireland) Michael Joseph Morrissey	Ford Escort RS Cosworth
1995	(Republic of Ireland) Eamonn Boland	(Republic of Ireland) Andrew Boland	Ford Escort RS Cosworth
1994	(Republic of Ireland) Mickey Farrell	(Republic of Ireland) Anthony Nestor	Subaru Legacy RS
1993	(United Kingdom) John Gilleece	(United Kingdom) Stephen Boswell	Ford Sierra RS Cosworth 4x4
1992	(Republic of Ireland) Stephen Murphy	(Republic of Ireland) Joe Deacon	Ford Sierra RS Cosworth 4x4
1991	(Republic of Ireland) Stephen Murphy	(Republic of Ireland) Joe Deacon	Ford Sierra RS Cosworth
1990	(Republic of Ireland) Michael Barrable	(Republic of Ireland) Dermot O'Rourke	Opel Manta 400
1989	(Republic of Ireland) James Cullen	(United Kingdom) Ellen Morgan	Opel Manta 400
1987	(Republic of Ireland) Vincent Bonner	(Republic of Ireland) Paul Kiely	Opel Ascona 400
1983	(United Kingdom) Kenny McKinstry	(Republic of Ireland) John McCafferty	Ford Escort RS 1800 MKII

Driver most wins
(Republic of Ireland) Niall Maguire	4
(Republic of Ireland) Declan Boyle	3
(Republic of Ireland) Stephen Murphy	3
(United Kingdom) Ian Greer	2
(United Kingdom) John Gileese	2

Driver most starts
(Republic of Ireland) Niall Maguire	17
(United Kingdom) Roger Kennedy	16
(Republic of Ireland) John Duffy	14
(Republic of Ireland) Daniel Conaghan	12
(Republic of Ireland) Michael Conlon	12
(Republic of Ireland) Colin Loughney	12

Most stage wins
(Republic of Ireland) Declan Boyle	25
(Republic of Ireland) Niall Maguire	20
(Republic of Ireland) Kevin Barrett	11
(Republic of Ireland) Josh Moffett	11
(Republic of Ireland) Ray Breen	10

* as of 2022
