= Ballymanus mine disaster =

Marine mine disaster in the Republic of Ireland

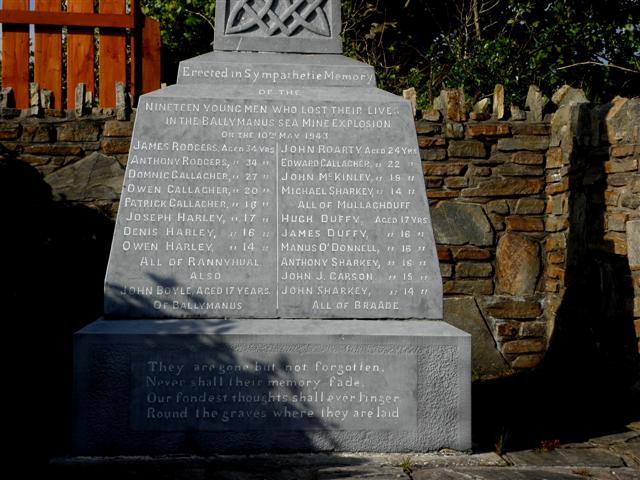
Inscription from a memorial to those killed in the explosion

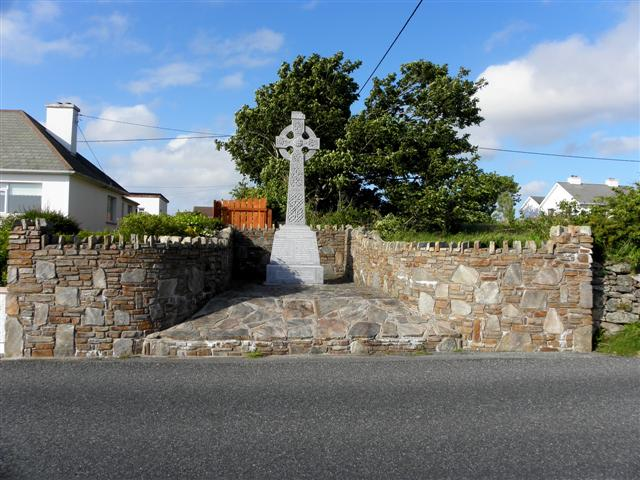
Memorial cross

The Ballymanus mine disaster occurred on 10 May 1943 on a beach at Ballymanus, County Donegal, Ireland when local villagers attempted to bring ashore an unexploded marine mine. Eighteen men and boys between the ages of 13 and 34 were killed in the explosion. Another died later.

According to contemporary reports, the mine had been spotted by a number of people, including local youths, some of whom then waded out and tied ropes around it in an attempt to haul it ashore. They were then joined by other men and boys from the local area but as it was being hauled along the beach it is believed to have struck a rock and exploded, killing 18 people instantly. Another died the following day. More than 40 houses in the nearby village were damaged by the blast.

Ireland was officially neutral during World War II, and there would not have been the same level of awareness amongst the public of the dangers of unexploded ordnance as in countries involved in the conflict. Other commentators noted that 15 other mines were made safe in Donegal in the same year, that local senior Garda Síochána members were aware of the mine at least 3 hours before the explosion and expected to secure a cordon around any reported mines. However, while some effort had been made to advise the community of the dangers, the additional actions prescribed in the standing orders had not been taken.
