= Killygordon =

Village in County Donegal, Ireland

Killygordon Cúil na gCuirridín
- Village
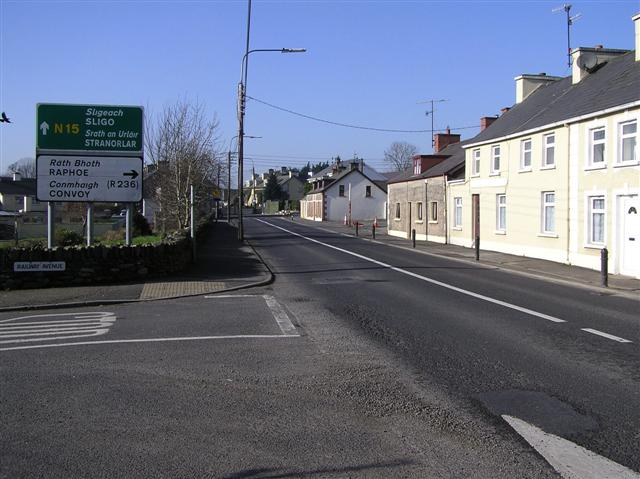
- The N15 passes through Killygordon

- Location in Ireland
- Coordinates: 54°47′49″N 7°41′01″W
- Country: Ireland
- Province: Ulster
- County: County Donegal

Population (2022)
  - Total: 716
- Time zone: UTC+0 (WET)
  - Summer (DST): UTC-1 (IST (WEST))

Killygordon (Irish: Cúil na gCuirridín) is a village in the Finn Valley in the east of County Donegal, Ireland. As of 2022, the population was 716. It is located on the N15 between Stranorlar and Castlefin. The separate hamlet of Crossroads, locally known as The Cross, lies half a mile from Killygordon. The townland of Liscooley is about 2 miles from Killygordon. The River Finn passes by Killygordon village on its way towards its confluence with the River Mourne and the River Foyle.

== Amenities ==
Killygordon has one pub. Other amenities include St. Patrick's Catholic church at the Crossroads, a Presbyterian church at Liscooley and St. Anne's Church of Ireland at Monellan.

== Economy ==
The main employer in the area is Donegal Creameries Plc which is based in the nearby village of the Crossroads. The dairy company, which is one of the largest employers in the county and employs over 100 people, has been in operation since 1989. They sponsor a number of sports in County Donegal, including the Donegal county football team and Finn Harps FC.

The Killygordon/Crossroads area is also home to McMenamin Engineering (a steel fabrication company) and Mantis Cranes (a crane rental and manufacturer).

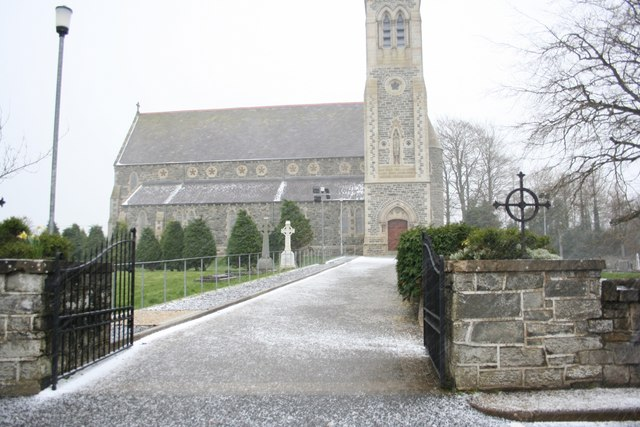
St. Patrick's Church at the Crossroads, Killygordon

== Places of interest ==
Monellan Castle, a castellated mansion which was previously located approximately two miles outside the village, was built during the 18th century. Parts of the 35-room dwelling were built underground, to be used as a place of safety - if such was required. The house and its gardens were in proper condition for some time after the Roman Catholic Relief Act 1778, until its demolition in the 1930s - on orders given to the Irish Land Commission by the government.

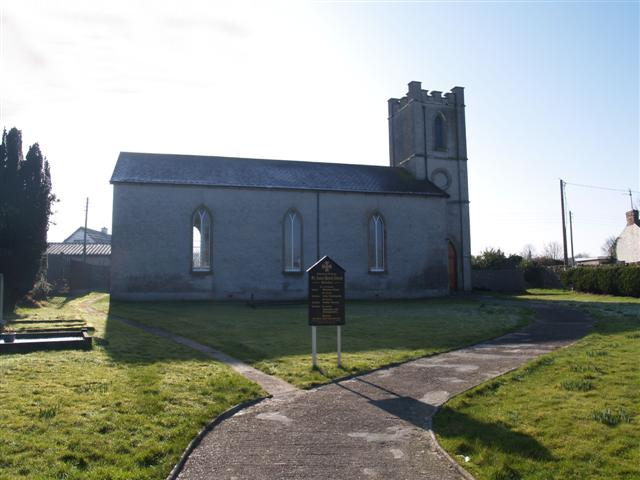
St Anne's Church of Ireland Church, Monnellan, The Cross

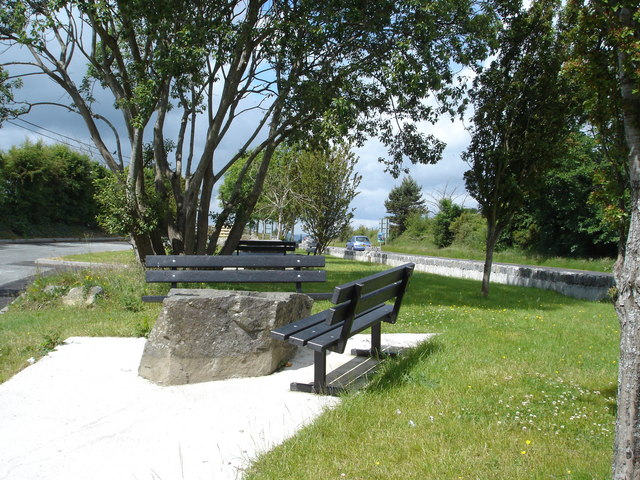
Picnic site in Killygordon

== Demographics ==
As of the 2022 census, Killygordon had a population of over 700 people. While the village and surrounding areas have a large Church of Ireland and Presbyterian minority, Roman Catholicism is the main religion practised. As of the 2022 census, 84% of respondents indicated that they were Catholic, 7% were of other stated religions and 9% had no religion or no stated religion.

== Sport ==
The local Gaelic football team is Aodh Rua (Red Hugh's) and Setanta is the local hurling team. They have separate Gaelic Athletic Association (GAA) grounds and both are located at the Crossroads.

Curragh Athletic Football Club are the local association football (soccer) club, featuring teams from under-10 up to senior men's sides in Curragh Athletic grounds.

Finn Harps F.C. operate an underage academy and training facilities in Crossroads, at the former Curragh Athletic grounds. Three pitches are in use with underage boys and girls teams from under-11 up to under-19 making use of the facilities.

== Education ==
There are two national (primary) schools in the area: Dromore National School and Killygordon National School. The Crossroads has one primary school, Gleneely National School.

The people of Killygordon get their secondary education either at the Finn Valley College (formally known as Stranorlar Vocational School), St. Columba's College Stranorlar or at the Royal and Prior, Raphoe.

== Townlands and electoral divisions ==
There are twenty-nine townlands, two hamlets and two electoral divisions in Killygordon.

| Townland | Gaeilge | Hamlet(s) | Electoral Division |
|---|---|---|---|
| Killygordon | Cúil na gCuirridín | ~ | Killygordon ED |
| Blairstown | ~ | Liscooley | Killygordon ED |
| Calhame | Calhaem | ~ | Killygordon ED |
| Carricknamanna | Carraig na Manach | ~ | Killygordon ED |
| Carricknashane | ~ | Liscooley | Killygordon ED |
| Caven Lower | ~ | ~ | Killygordon ED |
| Cavan Upper | ~ | ~ | Killygordon ED |
| Cooladawson | Cúil an Daingin | ~ | Killygordon ED |
| Corcam | ~ | ~ | Killygordon ED |
| Kiltown | Cill Bhaile | ~ | Killygordon ED |
| Leaght | ~ | Liscooley | Killygordon ED |
| Liscooly | Lios Cúile | Liscooley | Killygordon ED |
| Magheraboy | An Machaire Buí | Liscooley | Killygordon ED |
| Meenahoney | Mínehoney | Cusheen (Castlefin) | Killygordon ED |
| Mullingar | An Muileann gCearr | ~ | Killygordon ED |
| Scotland | Albain | Liscooley | Killgordon ED |
| Whitehill | An Cnoc Bán | ~ | Killygordon ED |
| Ballynacor | Béal Átha na Cora | Crossroads | Gleneely ED |
| Dromore | Droim Mór | Crossroads | Killygordon ED |
| Gleneely | Gleann Aola | Crossroads | Gleneely ED |
| Avaltygort | An tAbhallghort | Crossroads | Gleneely ED |
| Drumfergus | Droim Fearghas | Crossroads | Gleneely ED |
| Ballyarrel | Baile Uí Fhearghail | Crossroads | Gleneely ED |
| Ardnagannagh | Ard na gCanach | Crossroads | Gleneely ED |
| Carn | ~ | ~ | Killygordon ED |
| Monellan | Maigh Nialláin | Crossroads | Gleneely ED |
| Mounthall | ~ | Crossroads | Gleneely ED |
| Liscooley | Lios Cúile | Liscooley | Killygordon ED |
| Drumavish | Droim vis | Crossroads | Gleneely ED |
| Carrick | Carrig | Liscooley | Killygordon ED |

== Transport ==
Killygordon railway station opened in September 1863, but closed on 1 January 1960.

There is a bus service which connects Killygordon with Stranorlar and Strabane. From Stranorlar, there are routes to Letterkenny, Derry, Strabane, Dublin, Sligo and Galway. In Strabane there are Ulsterbus services to Derry, Omagh, and Belfast.

== Notable people ==
- Sir Jamie Flanagan, Chief Constable of the Royal Ulster Constabulary (RUC) from November 1973 to April 1976; born in Derry but raised near Killygordon.
- James Hewitt, 4th Viscount Lifford
- Hugh McLaughlin, publisher and inventor
- Donal Reid, All-Ireland winning footballer

== See also ==
- List of populated places in the Republic of Ireland
