= Castlefin =

Town in County Donegal, Ireland

Castlefin Caisleán na Finne
- Town
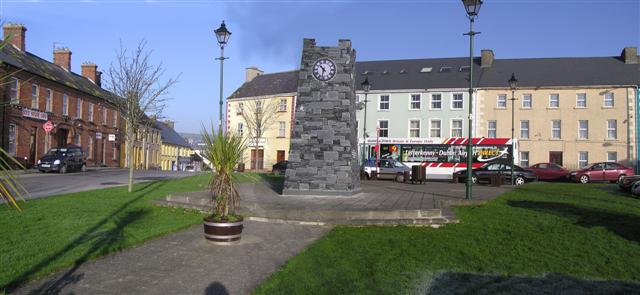
- The Diamond

- Location in Ireland
- Coordinates: 54°48′11″N 7°35′48″W
- Country: Ireland
- Province: Ulster
- County: County Donegal
- Main townland: Castlefin

Population (2022)
  - Total: 730
- Time zone: UTC+0 (WET)
  - Summer (DST): UTC-1 (IST (WEST))

Castlefin (Irish: Caisleán na Finne, meaning 'castle of the (river) Finn'), sometimes spelt Castlefinn, is a market town and townland in the Finn Valley of County Donegal, Ireland. It is located between Stranorlar and Lifford in East Donegal. As of 2022, the population was 730. The River Finn flows by the town. The town is located in along the main N15 national primary road, which runs from Bundoran to Lifford. The town lies 6 miles from Lifford and 8 miles from the twin towns of Ballybofey and Stranorlar. It has close links to Letterkenny, to the twin towns of Ballybofey and Stranorlar, and to West Tyrone in Northern Ireland, especially with the towns of Strabane and Castlederg.

== Amenities ==
The five housing estates in the town are called the Emmett Park built in the 1980s Sessaigh Park built in the 2000s, Caislean Court built in the 1990s, Hillhead built in the 1970s and Grahamsland built in the 1950s.

The town centre is located around the Diamond area, which is where three routes merge. The Diamond has landscaped seating and planting areas, and the surrounding area also has a number of buildings that are included on the Record of Protected Structures. The town has a number of retail, commercial, religious, economic, social and recreational amenities. Castlefinn also serves as a focus of primary education for the surrounding rural areas. The local national school has a large catchment area and currently has 180+ pupils attending. The town also has a pre-school.

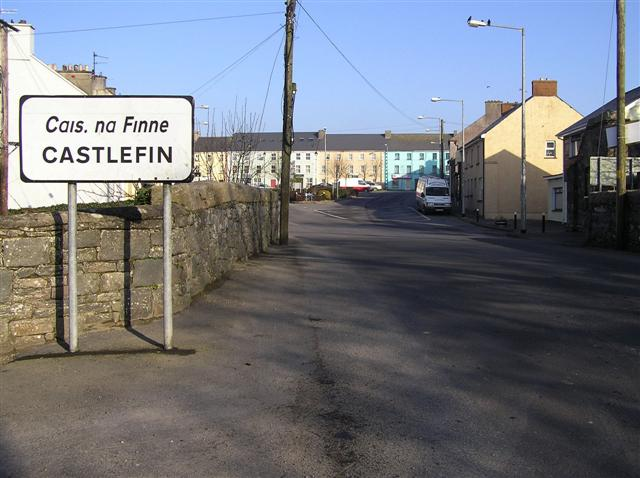
Approaching the village from the south

The town centre has a number of amenities including retail outlets, grocery stores, a petrol station, post office, butchers, take-aways, public houses and some hairdressers. The town also has a recycling facility that is located on the Castlederg road beside the bridge.

The C.P.I center is used for football, parties, computing and the youth club. There is a local GAA club (Robert Emmetts) and a soccer field (Castlefinn Celtic). Castlefinn is also the home of Finn Valley Radio which broadcasts on 95.8FM locally and online. The station holds a community licence and its studios are located at the CPI Centre.

== Schools ==
Local schools include St Mary's National School, Scoil Náisiúnta Domhnach Mór,(Liscooley) and St. Safan's National School (Doneyloop).

== Transport ==
Castlefinn railway station opened on 7 September 1863, but finally closed on 1 January 1960.

A number of buses pass through Castlefinn on a daily basis going to Letterkenny, Derry, Strabane, Dublin, Sligo and Galway.

== Townlands, hamlets and electoral divisions ==
There are 18 townlands in Castlefin, along with two hamlets and three electoral divisions.

Castlefin townlands, hamlets & electoral divisions
Townlands	Gaeilge	Hamlet(s)	Electoral division
Castlefin	Caisleán na Finne	~	Castlefinn ED
Grahamsland	Fearann Graham	~	Castlefinn ED
Donaghmore Glebe	Gléib Dhomhnach Mór	Cusheen	Castlefinn ED
Carrick	Charraig	Liscooley	Killygordon ED
Tawnacrom	An Tamhnach Chrom	~	Castlefinn ED
Cavanaweery	~	Cusheen	Urney West ED
Coolyslin	Cúil na Slinne	Cusheen	Urney West ED
Dresnagh	Drisneach	Cusheen	Urney West ED
Cormakilly	Chormaic Cille	Doneyloop	Urney West ED
Dunnaloob	Dún na Lúb	Doneyloop	Urney West ED
Roganspark	Páirc Uí Rógáin	Cusheen & Doneyloop	Urney West ED
Magherycallaghan	Machaire Callaghan	Doneyloop	Urney West ED
Ballybun	Baile Buna	~	Cloghard ED
Dungorman	Dún Gormáin	~	Cloghard ED
Drummurphy	Droim Muirí	~	Cloghard ED
Lisnamulligan	Lios na Muileoige	~	Cloghard ED
Gortnamuck	Gort na Muc	~	Cloghard ED
Hill Head (Grahamsland)	Ceann Chnoic	~	Castlefinn ED

== Politics ==
Castlefin is in the Donegal constituency for Dáil elections. The town is in the Lifford–Stranorlar Municipal District of Donegal County Council. The six councillors for the district include Gary Doherty of Castlefin.

== Notable people ==
- Seán Reid, Musician
- Ruby Druce (1915-2025) - oldest person in Ireland

== See also ==
- List of populated places in the Republic of Ireland
