= Ballybofey =

Town in County Donegal, Ireland

Ballybofey Bealach Féich (Irish)
- Town
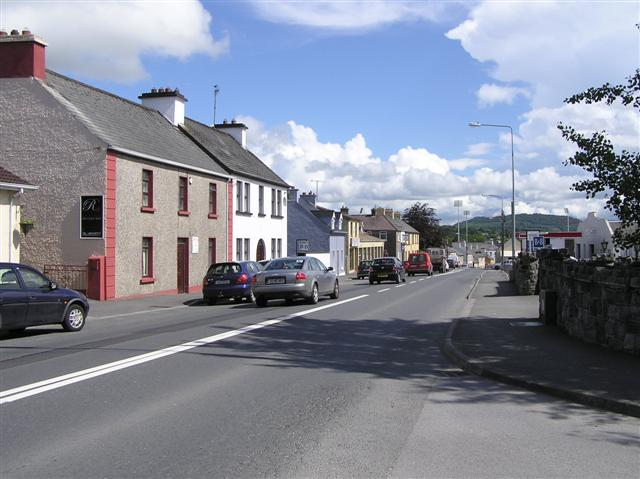
- The N15 road passes through Ballybofey

- Location in Ireland
- Coordinates: 54°48′00″N 7°47′24″W
- Country: Ireland
- Province: Ulster
- County: County Donegal
- Main townland: Ballybofey
- Elevation: 30 m (98 ft)

Population (2022)
  - Total: 5,406
- Time zone: UTC+0 (WET)
  - Summer (DST): UTC+1 (IST (WEST))
- Irish Grid Reference: H194946
- Website: ballybofeystranorlar.com

Historical population
Year	Pop.	±%
1821	1,671	—
1831	1,515	−9.3%
1841	1,167	−23.0%
1851	1,297	+11.1%
1861	1,404	+8.2%
1871	1,349	−3.9%
1881	1,429	+5.9%
1891	1,219	−14.7%
1901	1,203	−1.3%
1911	1,189	−1.2%
1926	1,250	+5.1%
1936	1,198	−4.2%
1946	1,256	+4.8%
1951	1,274	+1.4%
1956	1,586	+24.5%
1961	1,878	+18.4%
1966	1,942	+3.4%
1971	2,214	+14.0%
1981	2,928	+32.2%
1986	2,964	+1.2%
1991	2,972	+0.3%
1996	3,047	+2.5%
2002	3,603	+18.2%
2006	4,176	+15.9%
2016	4,852	+16.2%
2022	5,406	+11.4%

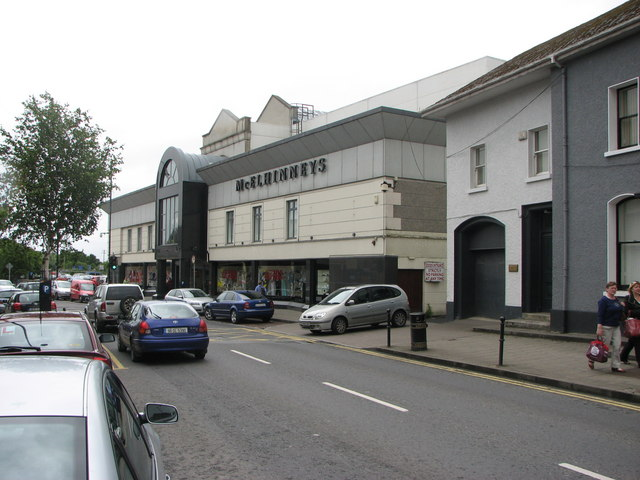
McElhinney's Department Store

Ballybofey (/ˌbælibəˈfeɪ/ BAL-ee-bə-FAY, locally /ˌbælbəˈfeɪ/ BAL-bə-FAY; Irish: Bealach Féich, meaning 'Fiach's pass') is a town located on the south bank of the River Finn, County Donegal, Ireland. Together with the smaller town of Stranorlar on the north side of the River Finn, the towns form the twin towns of Ballybofey-Stranorlar. The twin towns, a census town, had a population of 5,406 in 2022.

== History ==
A few miles west of Ballybofey, on the main road to Fintown (the R252), is the Glenmore Estate, located at Welchtown. The estate formerly included Glenmore Lodge, a country house that stood on the opposite, southern bank of the River Finn, near Glenmore Bridge. The house was originally built in the Georgian-style in the mid-to-late-18th-century. It was reworked for Sir William Styles in the neo-Tudor-style in the early 20th century. The house was demolished in the 1990s. The private estate is now known for its fishing and hunting.

The town grew rapidly in the 19th and 20th centuries. There are no schools or churches in the town of Ballybofey itself, with all these amenities lying either across the bridge in Stranorlar or outside the town limits. This is due to laws during plantation times when certain Catholic buildings were not allowed within a specified range of Protestant towns, in this case Stranorlar, though Stranorlar now has both a Roman Catholic and a Church of Ireland church.

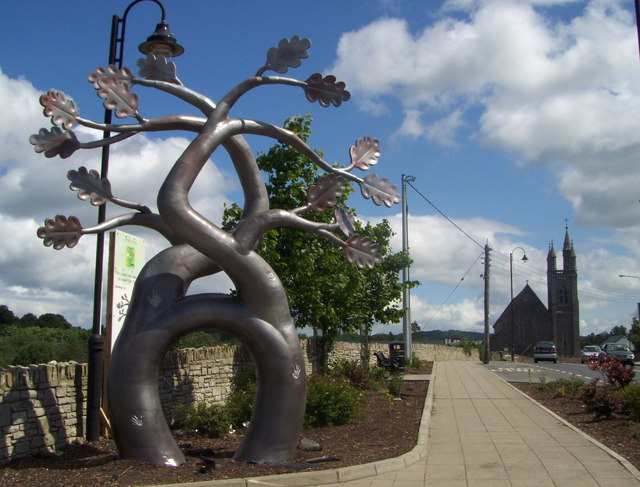
'The Matrimony Tree' sculpture

== Events ==
Ballybofey previously played host to an annual Twin Towns Festival. The last of these took place in August 2007.

The Balor Arts Centre is a 300-seat arts and theatre complex, and Butt Drama Circle is a local amateur drama group.

== Sport ==
Ballybofey is home to Finn Park where League of Ireland side Finn Harps play their home games. Seán MacCumhaill Park is also located in Ballybofey, where the Donegal senior football team have their county office and play most of their home games.

== Transport ==
Ballybofey railway station opened on 3 June 1895, but closed on 15 December 1947.

Bus Éireann routes 64 (Derry/Galway) and 480 (Ballybofey/Derry) pass through the town.

TFI Local Link route 264 (Ballyshannon/Letterkenny), 288 (Ballybofey/Derry) and 290 (Ballybofey/Letterkenny) all service the town.

The town is on the N15 road. The N15 has a junction with the N13 road in Stranorlar.

== People ==
- Isaac Butt (1813–1879) – politician, leader of the Home Rule League, born a short distance away in Glenfin, where the Isaac Butt Memorial Hall stands
- John Dunleavy (born 1991) – footballer
- Conal Gallen (born 1955) – singer and comedian.
- Oisín Gallen – footballer
- Jimmy Kelly (1911–1970) – footballer
- Ernan McMullin (1924–2011) – philosopher
- Joseph Barclay Pentland (1797–1873) – geographer, natural scientist, and traveller.
- Jason Quigley (born 1991) – boxer

== See also ==
- List of populated places in Ireland
- List of market houses in the Republic of Ireland
- Stranorlar County Mother & Baby Home
