= River Finn (Foyle tributary) =

Coordinates: 54°48′04″N 7°44′45″W

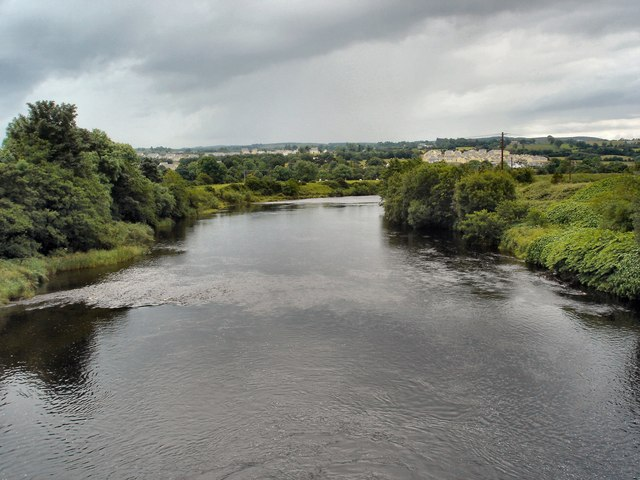
- River Finn
- Etymology: Irish finn, "fair/clear"
- Native name: An Fhinn (Irish)

Location
- Jurisdictions: Republic of Ireland & Northern Ireland
- Counties: Donegal, Tyrone

Physical characteristics
- Source
  - location: Lough Finn, County Donegal
- Mouth
  - location: North Channel via Lough Foyle
- Length: 63.17 km (39.25 mi)
- Basin size: 505 km^{2} (195 mi^{2})
- Discharge
  - average: 8.253 m^{3}/s (291.5 cu ft/s)

Basin features
- River system: Foyle

The River Finn (Irish: Abhainn na Finne) is a river in the west of Ulster, the northern province in Ireland. The river mainly flows through County Donegal, part of the Republic of Ireland, while a short stretch of the river also partially flows through County Tyrone, part of Northern Ireland. From Lough Finn, the river goes to Ballybofey and Stranorlar before joining the River Mourne at Lifford and Strabane.

The Monellan Burn, also known as the Creamery Burn, flows into the River Finn very near a hamlet called The Cross, not far from the former site of Monellan Castle, just outside Killygordon. From Castlefin downstream, the river is tidal, becoming deeper towards Strabane. The Finn is 40 miles (64 km) long and together with its tributary the Reelin River, drains a catchment area of 195 square miles. The River Foyle is formed by the confluence of the River Mourne and the River Finn, west of Lifford Bridge. The area which the River Finn flows through is called the Finn Valley. The village of Clady, near Strabane in County Tyrone, is on the River Finn. The football club in Ballybofey, Finn Harps, is named after the river.

== Angling ==
The upper reaches of the Reelin and the Finn are fast downstream to Ballybofey and can give excellent fishing. From Ballybofey downstream the river becomes deeper and slower. In all there is more than 25 miles (40 km) of salmon fishing on the river from Flushtown right up to Bellanmore Bridge and part of the Reelan too. There is good sea trout fishing at Liscooley and Killygordan and from Ballybofey to Bellanamore Bridge. The Finn and its tributary the Reelan are probably the most prolific salmon and grilse rivers in Donegal and indeed throughout the Foyle catchment. Fish species such as roach, perch, eels and brown trout are caught in the Finn system.

== Area of special scientific interest ==
The River Foyle and tributaries Area of Special Scientific Interest (ASSI) include the River Foyle and its tributaries i.e. that part of the River Finn which is within Northern Ireland, the River Mourne and its tributary the River Strule (up to its confluence with the Owenkillew River) and the River Derg, along with two of its sub-tributaries, the Mourne Beg River and the Glendergan River. The area encompasses 120 km of watercourse and is notable for the physical diversity and naturalness of the banks and channels, especially in the upper reaches, and the richness and naturalness of its plant and animal communities. Of particular importance is the population of Atlantic Salmon, which is one of the largest in Europe. Research has indicated that each sub-catchment within the system supports genetically distinct populations.
