= Trew and Moy railway station =

Station in County Tyrone, Northern Ireland

Trew and Moy
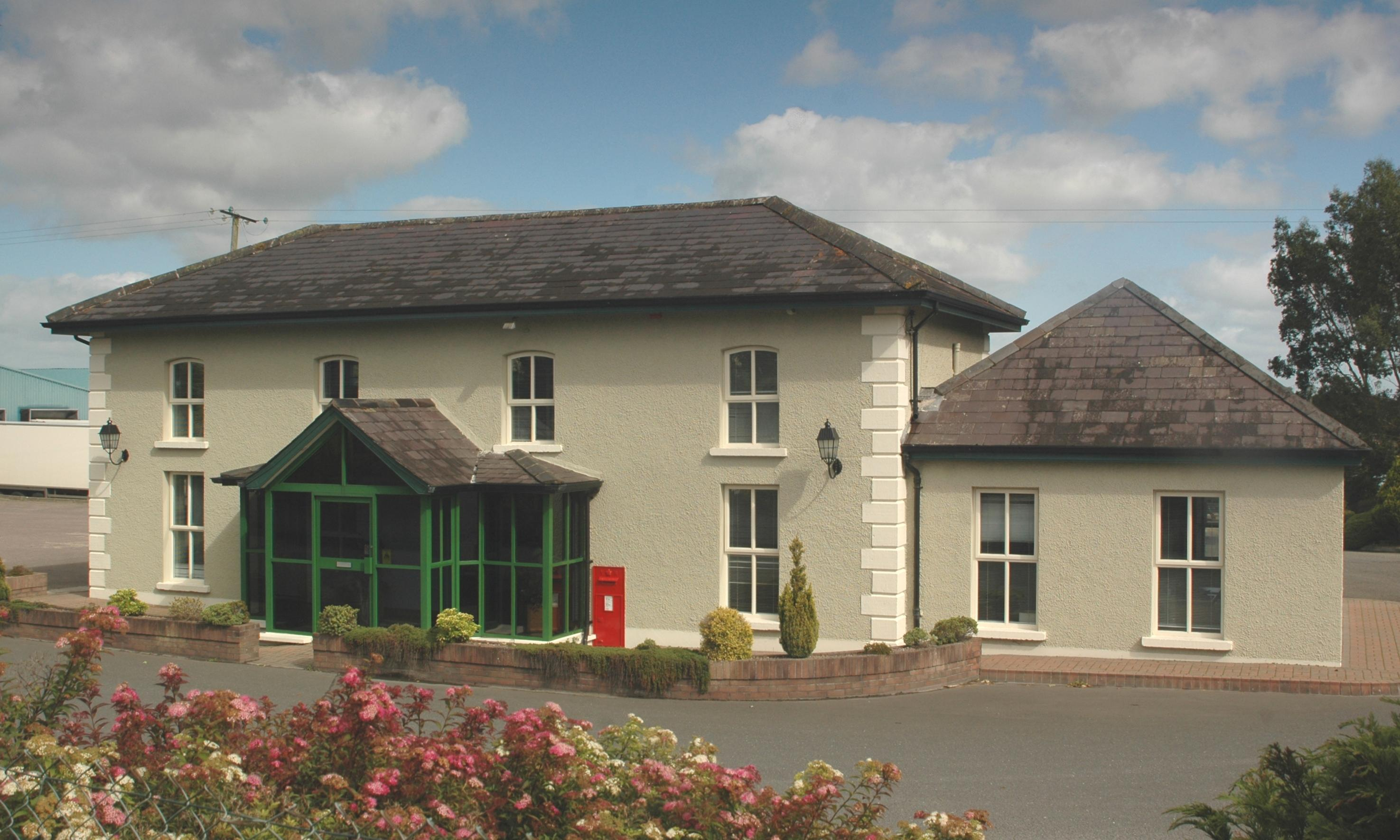
- Main building of former station in 2010

General information
- Location: Trew Mount, County Tyrone, Northern Ireland; UK
- Coordinates: 54.480°N 6.677°W
- Platforms: 2

History
- Original company: Portadown, Dungannon and Omagh Junction Railway
- Post-grouping: Great Northern Railway

Key dates
- 1858: Station opened
- 1899–1902: Track doubled east of station
- 1959: Track singled east of station
- 15 February 1965: Station closed
Location

Trew and Moy railway station was a railway station in County Tyrone, Northern Ireland. The station was near Trew Mount, over 2 miles (3 kilometres) north of Moy.

== History ==
The station was opened in 1858 by the Portadown, Dungannon and Omagh Junction Railway, which the Great Northern Railway (GNR) took over in 1876. Trew and Moy was served by GNR passenger trains between Belfast Great Victoria Street and Londonderry Foyle Road via Portadown. The station became important in the export of horses from Moy's annual week-long horse fair. The Ulster Transport Authority took over the GNR's remaining lines in Northern Ireland in 1958 and closed the PD&O line on 15 February 1965.

The former station now holds a mushroom distribution business. The main station building, which was on the south side of the station beside the down platform, now contains offices, and the former goods shed is a staff facility. A lower quadrant stop signal, a lower quadrant distant signal and a shunting signal have been relocated to a garden beside the station, along with a wooden shelter from the up platform that has been repurposed as a summer house.

Preceding station	Disused railways	Following station
Vernersbridge	Portadown, Dungannon and Omagh Junction Railway; Portadown to Omagh	Dungannon
Vernersbridge	Ulster Transport Authority; Portadown — Omagh line	Dungannon

== Sources ==
- Baker, Michael H.C. (1972). Irish Railways since 1916. London: Ian Allan. ISBN 0-7110-0282-7.
- FitzGerald, J.D. (1995). The Derry Road. Colourpoint Transport. Vol. 2. Gortrush: Colourpoint Press. ISBN 1-898392-09-9.
- Hajducki, S. Maxwell (1974). A Railway Atlas of Ireland. Newton Abbott: David & Charles. ISBN 0-7153-5167-2.

== Gallery ==
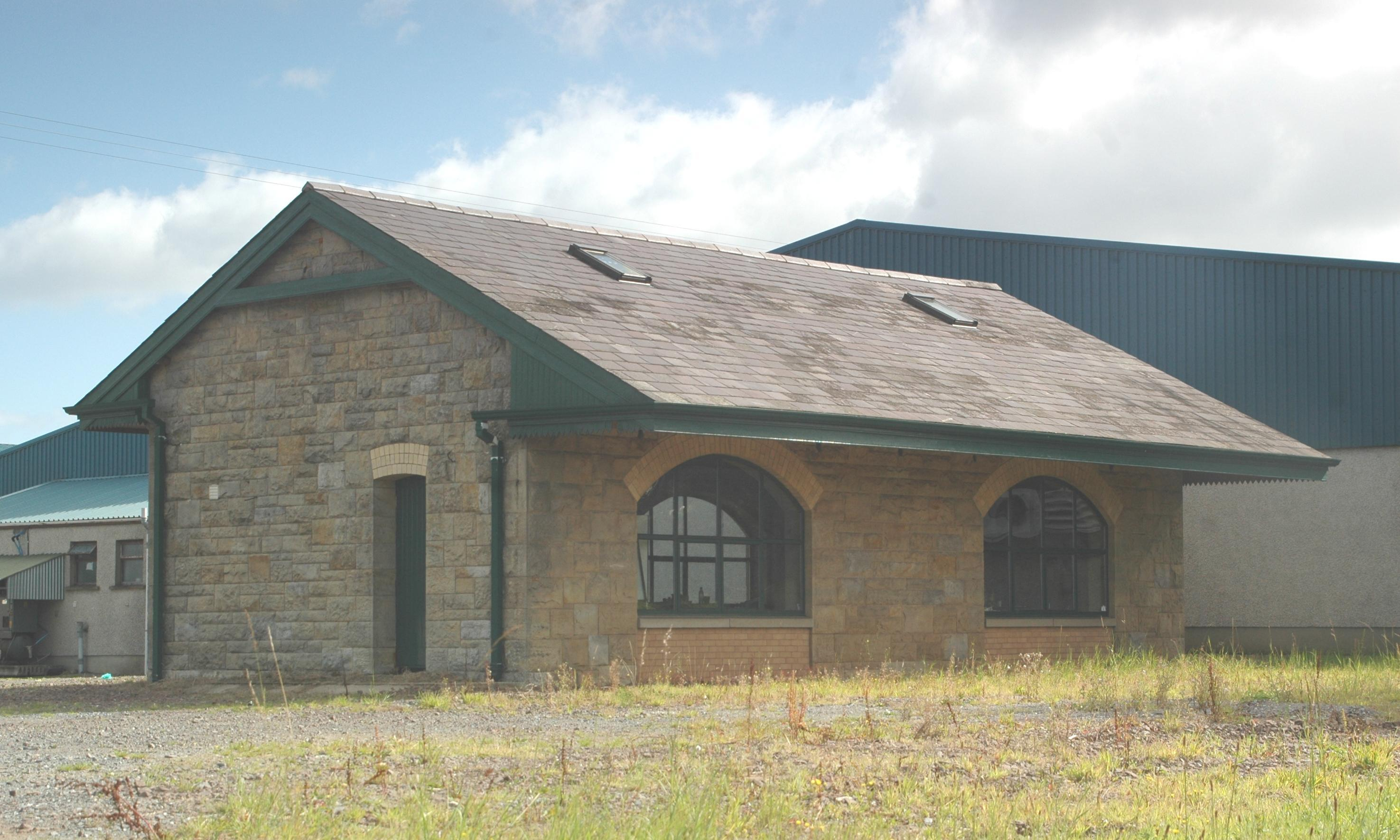
Former goods shed, just west of passenger station

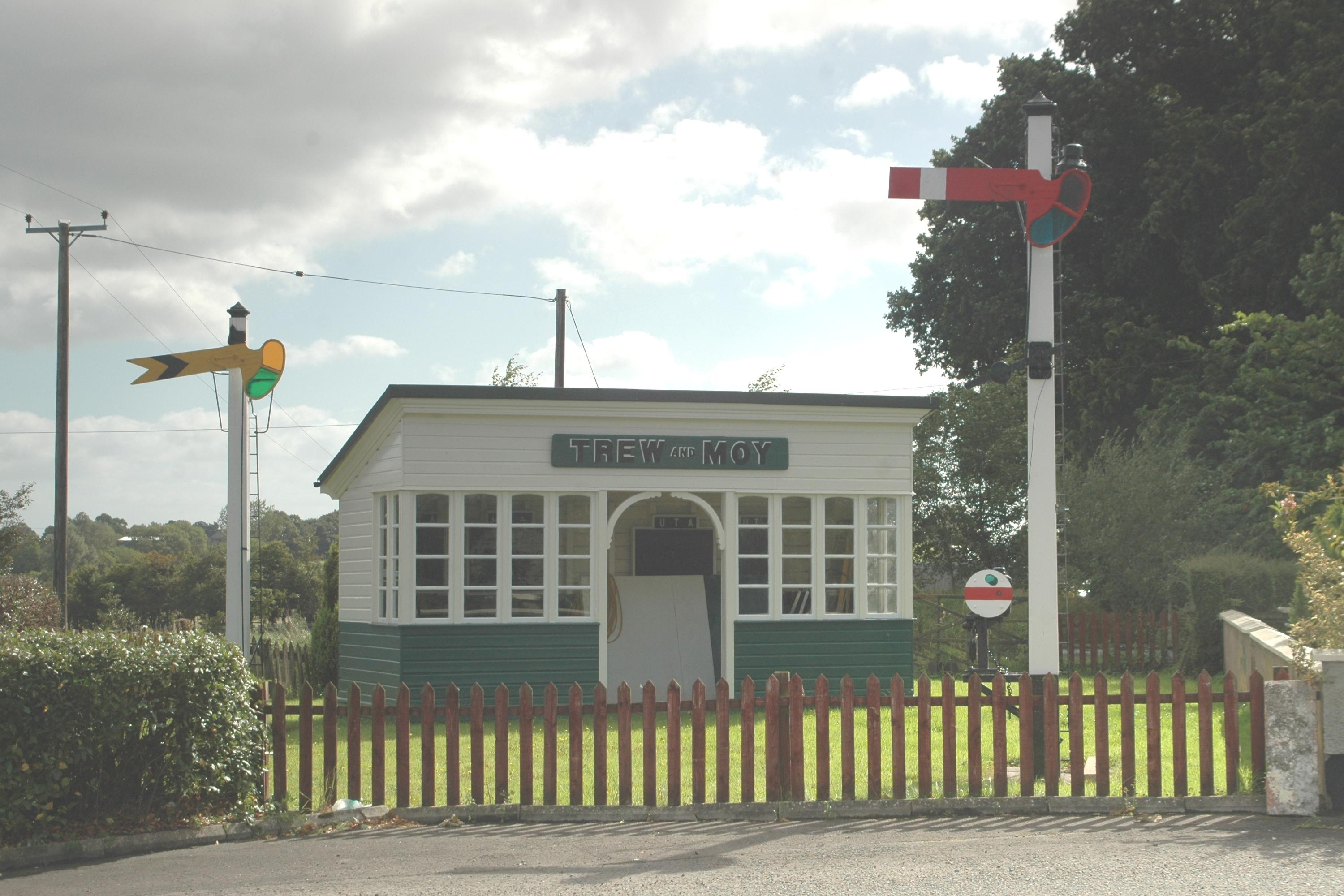
Passenger shelter from "up" platform, repositioned in a garden with former GNR signals

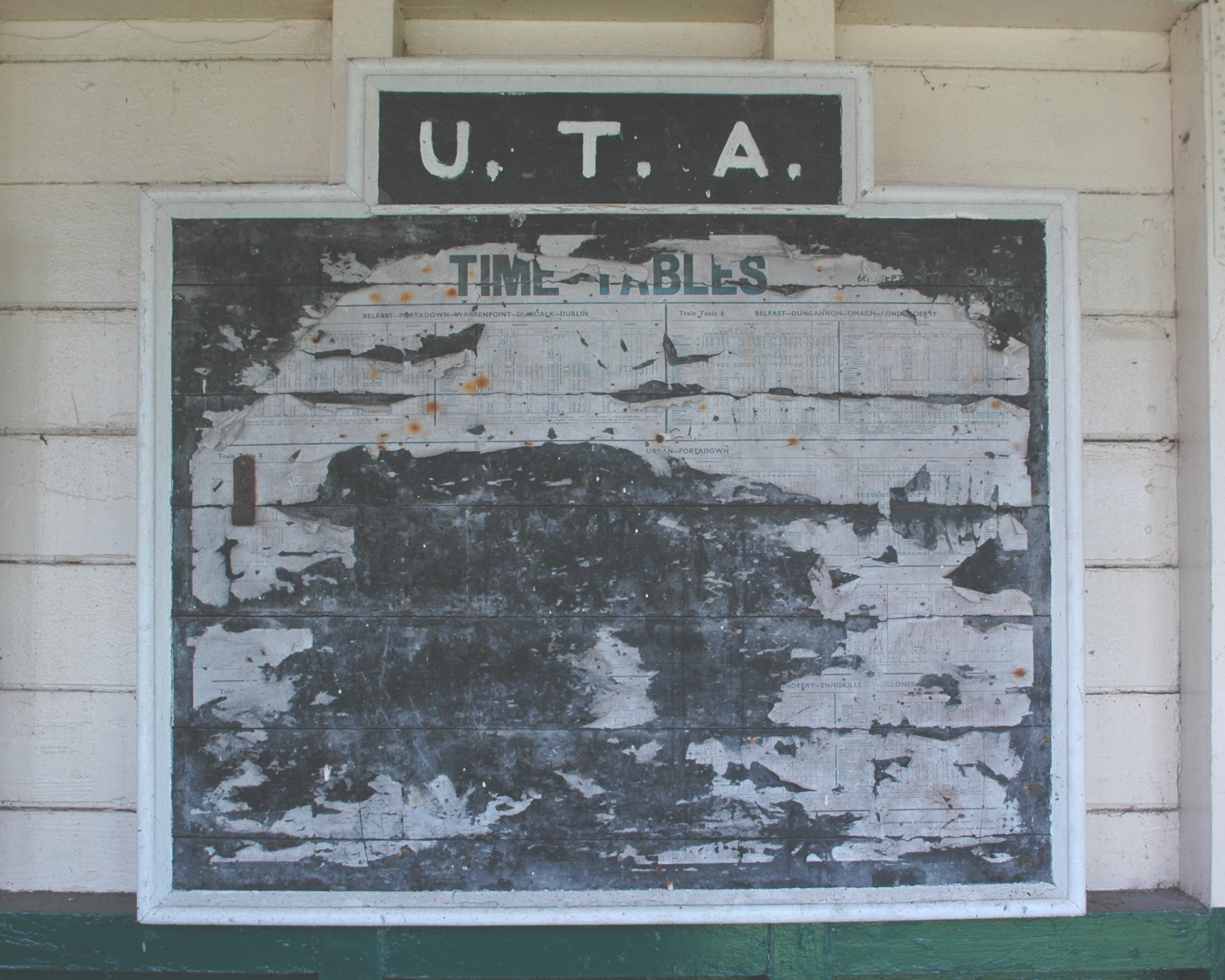
Remains of timetable poster inside former "up" platform shelter

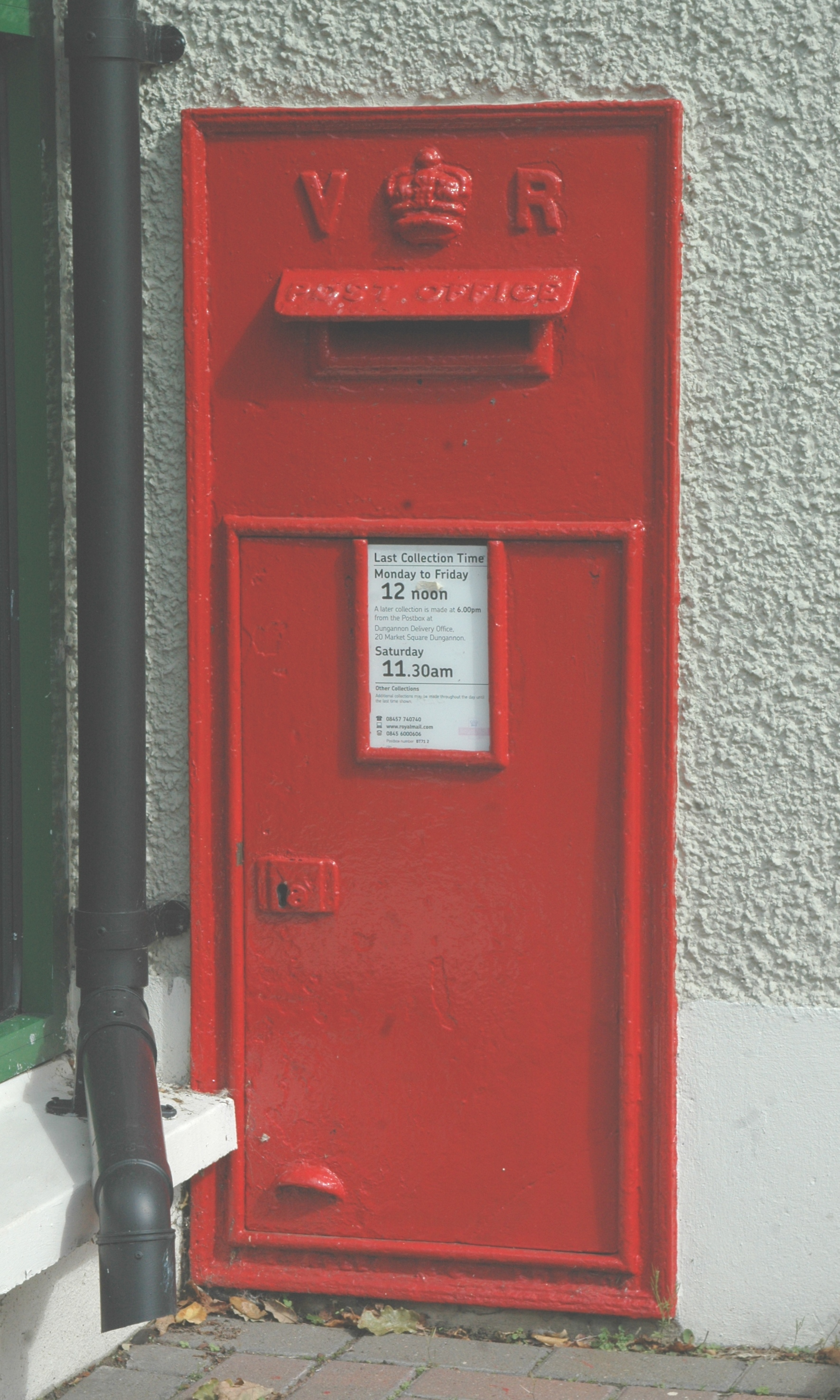
Royal Mail Victorian wallbox in front wall of main building
