= Vernersbridge railway station =

Station in County Armagh, Northern Ireland

Vernersbridge
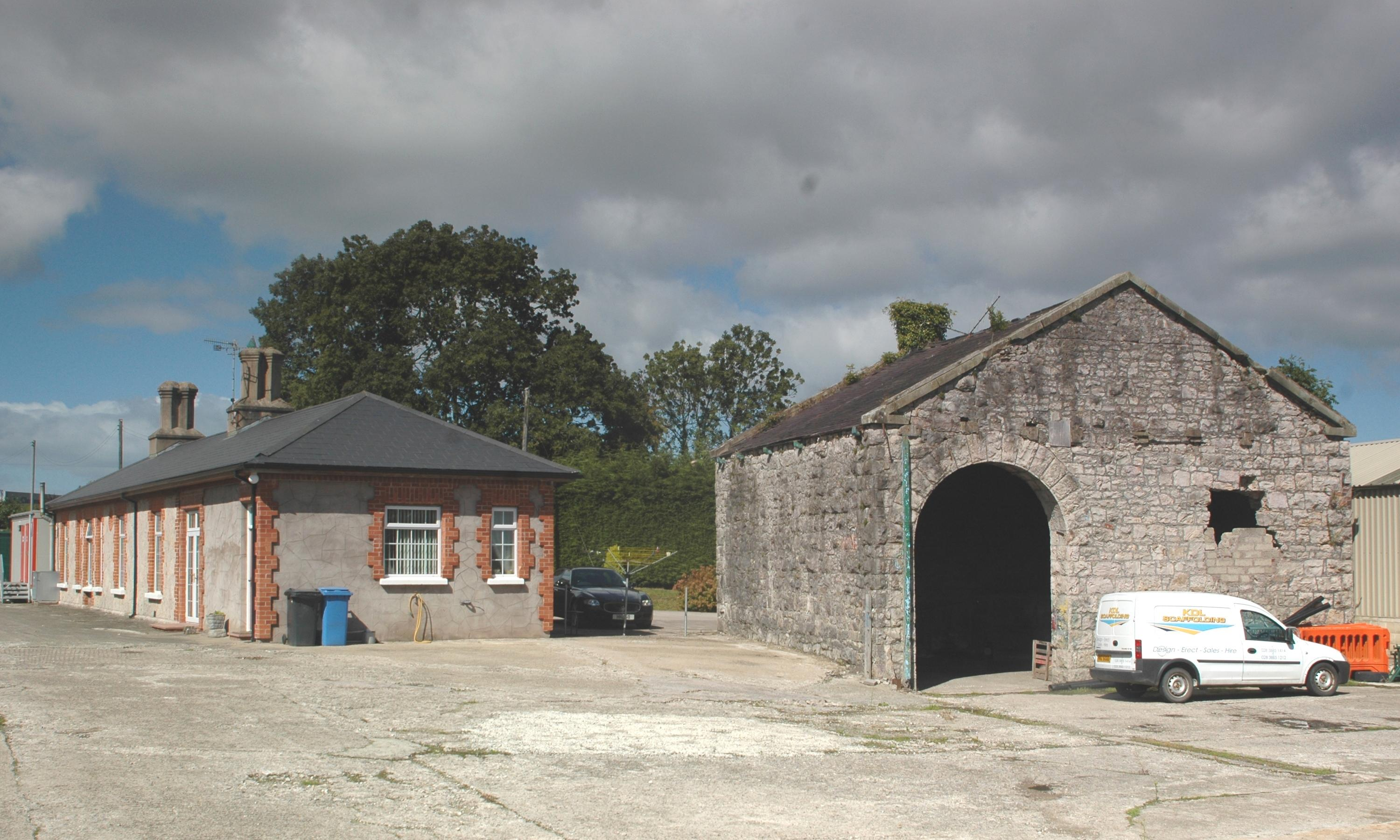
- Vernersbridge former station building and goods shed, 2010

General information
- Location: Vernersbridge, County Armagh, Northern Ireland; UK
- Coordinates: 54.47265°N 6.64186°W
- Elevation: 78 ft (24 m)
- Platforms: 2

History
- Original company: Portadown, Dungannon and Omagh Junction Railway
- Post-grouping: Great Northern Railway

Key dates
- 1858: Station opened
- 1899–1902: Track doubled
- 1954: Station closed
- 1959: Track singled
- 15 February 1965: Line closed
Location

Vernersbridge railway station was a railway station in County Armagh, Northern Ireland. The station was about 0.7 miles (1.1 kilometres) south of Clonmore and about 0.25 miles (400 metres) east of a substantial viaduct by which the railway crossed the River Blackwater.

== History ==
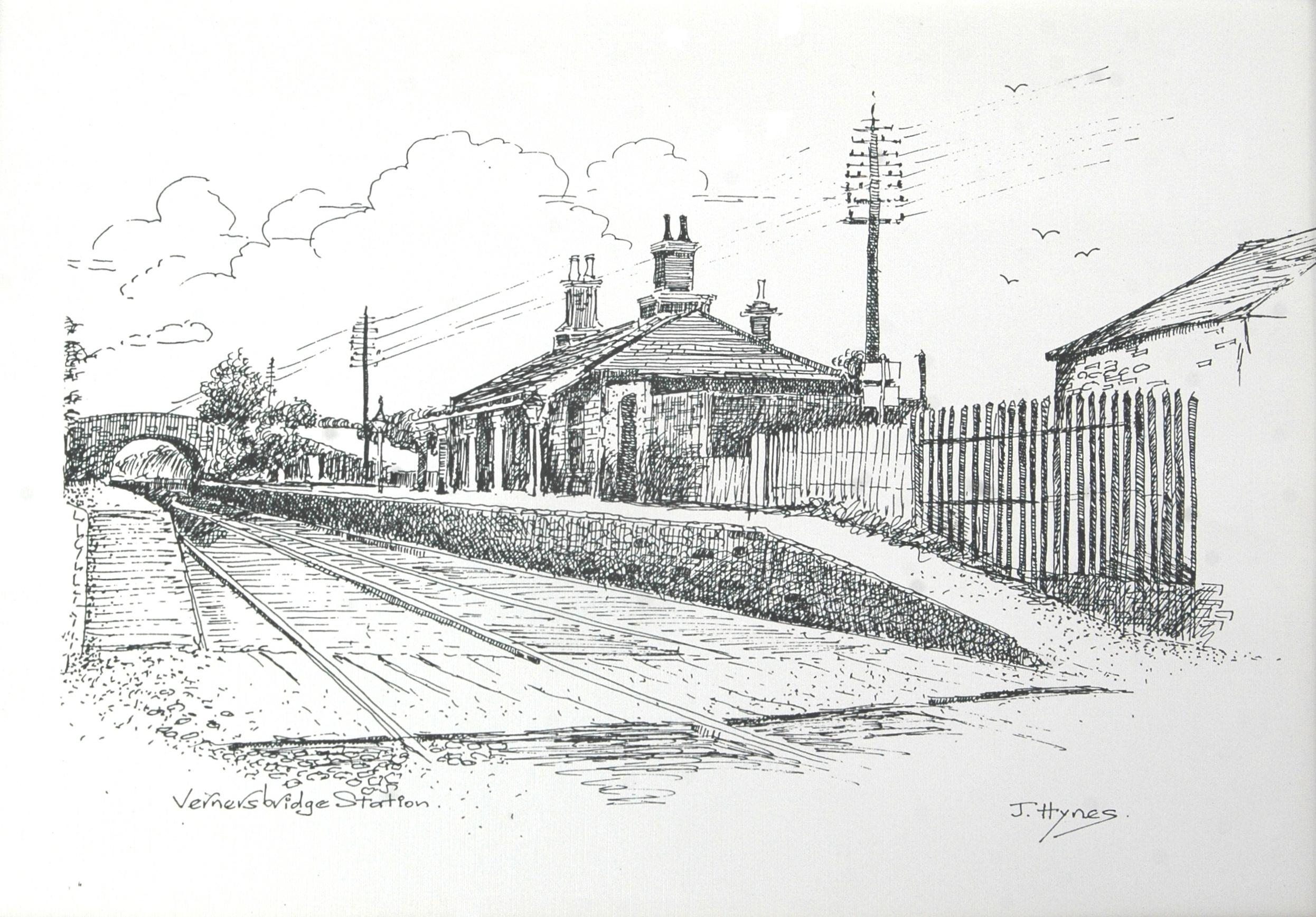
Drawing of Vernersbridge station when the railway was still open

The Portadown, Dungannon and Omagh Junction Railway (PD&O) opened the station in 1858 as Verner's, named after local landowner William Verner. Mr Verner did not want a standard PD&O station building as at Annaghmore and Trew and Moy, so at his request Verner's station was built to match his home at Churchill. The station had no signal box and its signals were worked by a ground frame.

The newly formed Great Northern Railway (GNR) absorbed the PD&O in 1876 and doubled the track through Vernersbridge in 1899–1902. Vernersbridge was served by GNR passenger trains between Belfast Great Victoria Street and Londonderry Foyle Road via Portadown.

The GNR was nationalised in 1953 as the GNR Board, which closed Vernersbridge station in 1954. The Ulster Transport Authority took over the GNR's remaining lines in Northern Ireland in 1958 and closed the PD&O line on 15 February 1965.

The former station and goods shed survive: the station as a private house and the goods shed as its outbuilding.

Preceding station	Disused railways	Following station
Annaghmore	Portadown, Dungannon and Omagh Junction Railway; Portadown to Omagh	Trew and Moy
Derrycoose Crossing	GNR Board; Portadown — Omagh line	Trew and Moy

== Sources ==
- Baker, Michael H.C. (1972). Irish Railways since 1916. London: Ian Allan. ISBN 0-7110-0282-7.
- FitzGerald, J.D. (1995). The Derry Road. Colourpoint Transport. Vol. 2. Gortrush: Colourpoint Press. ISBN 1-898392-09-9.
- Hajducki, S. Maxwell (1974). A Railway Atlas of Ireland. Newton Abbott: David & Charles. ISBN 0-7153-5167-2.
