= Annakeera Crossing =

Disused railway halt in Northern Ireland

General information
- Location: Annaghmore, County Armagh; Northern Ireland; UK
- Coordinates: 54.436428°N 6.484651°W
- Elevation: 110 ft (34 m)

History
- Original company: Portadown, Dungannon and Omagh Junction Railway
- Post-grouping: Great Northern Railway

Key dates
- 1858: line opened
- 1899–1902: Track doubled
- by June 1938: Request halt
- 1959: Track singled
- 13 June 1960: Halt closed

Services
| Preceding station | Disused railways | Following station |
|---|---|---|
| Portadown | Ulster Transport Authority; Portadown — Omagh line | Annaghmore |
Location

Annakeera Crossing was a level crossing near Annaghmore in County Armagh, Northern Ireland. By 1938 it was also a railway request halt.

== History ==
The Great Northern Railway opened the halt on its Portadown — Omagh line. The Ulster Transport Authority took over the GNR's remaining lines in Northern Ireland in 1958 and closed the halt in 1960.
