= Ballymun Flats =

Former apartment buildings in Dublin, Ireland

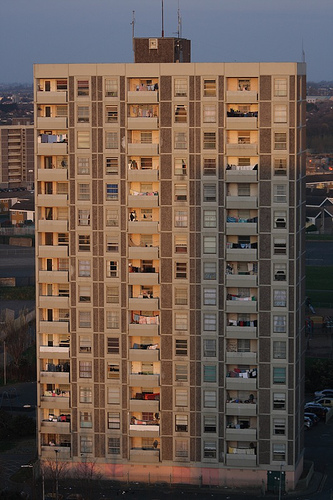
- Joseph Plunkett tower with the Sillogue Road flats in the background.

General information
- Status: Demolished
- Type: Residential
- Architectural style: Brutalist / modernist
- Location: Ballymun, Dublin, Ireland, Sandyhill Avenue, Sillogue Avenue, Shangan Avenue, Balbutcher Lane, Shangan Road.
- Coordinates: 53°23′51″N 06°16′03″W
- Construction started: 1966
- Completed: 1969
- Opening: 1969
- Demolished: 2004–2015
- Owner: Dublin Corporation later Dublin City Council

Height
- Height: 42 metres (138 ft) (tower block elements)

Technical details
- Structural system: Lowton-Cubitt steel frame and concrete
- Floor count: 17

Design and construction
- Architect: Dublin Corporation
- Main contractor: Cubitt Haden Sisk consortium

The Ballymun Flats referred to a number of flats—including the seven Ballymun High-tower blocks—in Ballymun, Dublin, Ireland. Built rapidly in the 1960s, there were 36 blocks in total, consisting of 7 fifteen-storey, 19 eight-storey, and 10 four-storey blocks. The complex was built in a Corbusian style known as towers in the park, which was popular in European and American cities in the mid-20th century.

The 15-storey blocks actually had 17 storeys, including the entrance floor and a plant room on their roofs. Joseph Plunkett tower, named after one of the signatories of the Proclamation of the Irish Republic, was typical of the taller tower blocks. It was a 42-metre, 8,500-tonne building that housed 90 families in 30 three-, two-, and one-bedroom units.

The entire complex was demolished in the early 21st century. By October 2013, there were just three remaining blocks, all of which were empty. The last block was demolished in September 2015.

== History ==
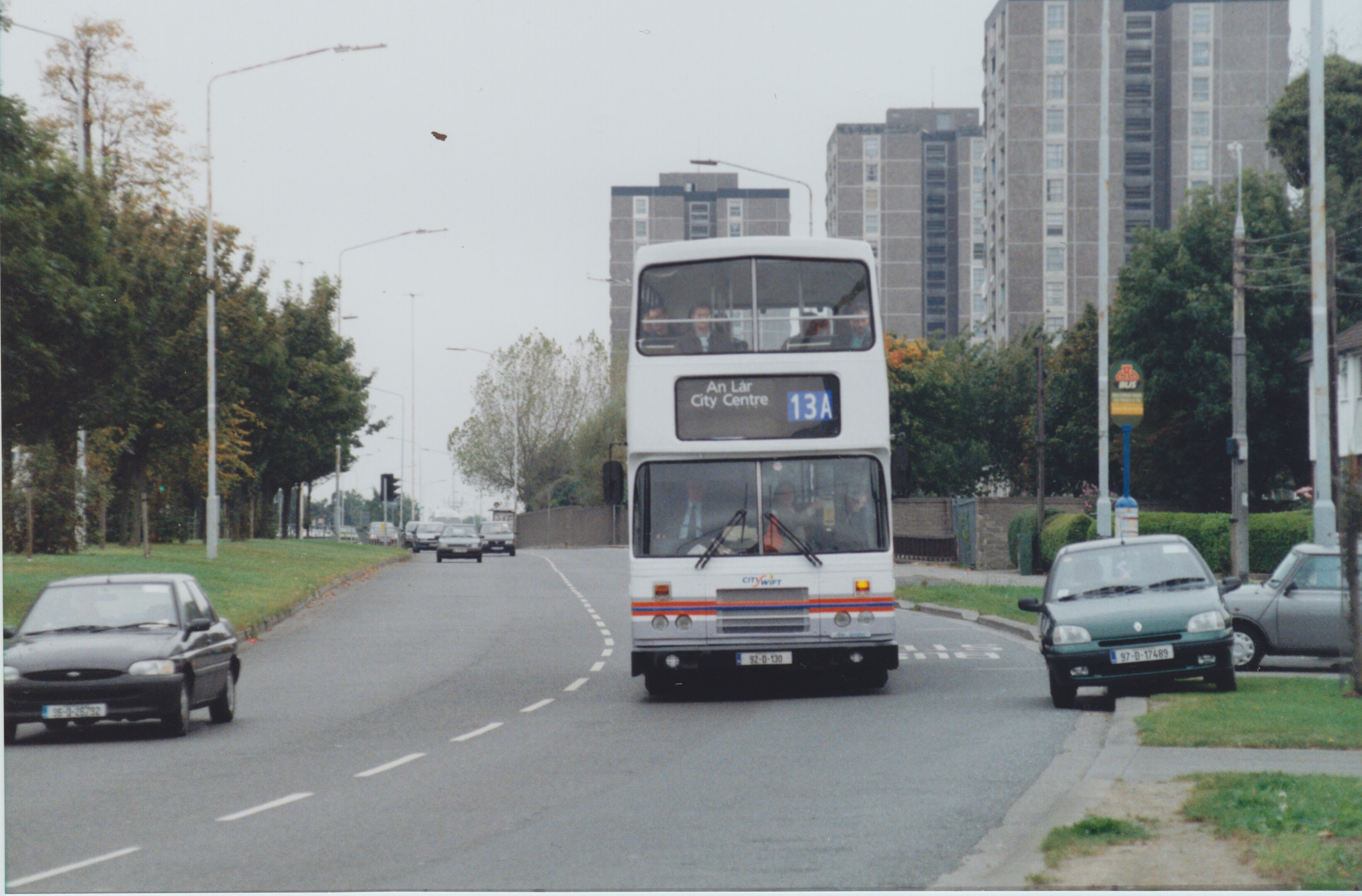
A Ballymun street scene with some of the tower blocks visible in the distance, circa late-1990s.

The Ballymun Flats were built in the 1960s to accommodate the rising population, particularly to accommodate former residents of inner-city areas which were being cleared in the process of 1960s urban slum clearances. Whilst suffering from a lack of sufficient public amenities, several schools served the area (Holy Spirit N.S. and Ballymun Comprehensive(now Trinity Comprehensive School)), as well as an Eastern Health Board medical centre and a purpose-built shopping centre. The area suffered from many social problems such as drugs and rampant crime. The causes of these social problems, and the subsequent discrimination faced by many people with Ballymun addresses when seeking employment outside the suburb, have been disputed, but Ballymun generally paralleled the experience of many working-class people in the 1960 and 1970s when placed in high-rise locations.

Despite the negative perceptions of many non-residents of Ballymun, many of the residents insist that there is a strong sense of pride and community in the area. Lynn Connolly, whose 2006 memoir The Mun: Growing Up in Ballymun detailed her raising there in the 1970s and 1980s, readily acknowledged the problems there, and that during those years she wished to leave; however, she later came to realise that there had been much that was good at the towers – in terms of a collective wit among residents and a helping sense of community – which had been ignored by the media.

The Ballymun Flats were the first homes with cable television in Ireland. RTÉ Relays Ltd, a subsidiary of the national broadcaster RTÉ, installed cable television into the flats in 1963, giving each residence access to Irish stations such as RTÉ Television and UK stations such as BBC One, BBC Two, ITV, and from 1982, Channel 4.

== Four-storey flats ==
The four-storey flats were situated on Sandyhill Avenue, Sillogue Avenue, and Shangan Avenue. They were the earliest complexes to be demolished. The former flats of Sillogue Avenue are now open land, whilst the former flats of Shangan Avenue have been replaced by new complexes. A new area called Marewood, consisting of houses and apartments, is now situated where the Sandyhill Avenue flats once stood.

== Eight-storey flats ==
The eight-storey flats were situated along Balbutcher Lane, where there were two blocks; Shangan Road, where there were three blocks; Coultry Road, where there were four blocks; and Balcurris and Sillogue Roads, each of which had five blocks.

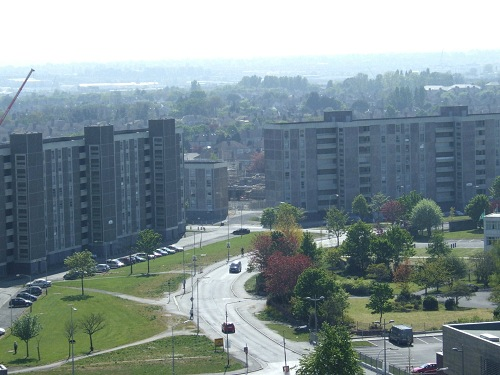
The eight-storey flats contained two different designs, one where the lift was located opposite the stairwell (pictured right) and an alternative design where the lift was located on the same side as the stairwell, as seen here on Sillogue Road, the four-storey Sillogue Avenue can be seen in the middle.

The flats had two different designs, the more common being with the lift on the opposite side of the stairwell, Balbutcher and Shangan were the only ones to feature this design. Balcurris contained one of the alternative blocks, Sillogue contained the alternative blocks and three of the other blocks, three of the four Coultry blocks were made contained the lift on the side of the stairwell. Balcurris was the only row of flats to have its blocks separated by a road, the latter three blocks faced a different direction to the first two blocks and were the most visible from Dublin Airport.

Balbutcher Lane was upgraded in the 1990s where only residents were allowed to enter and had to buzz their way in, visitors needed permission from residents in order to enter. Windows were placed on the balconies and post would be delivered similar to how an apartment block would receive their mail. Railings were also placed around the flats and a playground was built at the back of the complex.

Sections of Coultry and Balcurris were demolished first, with the latter becoming the first complex to be completely demolished by 2009, it was originally noted that the Ballymun Shopping Centre and Metro North would be situated on the old Balcurris site, although these plans failed to materialize. Many of the complexes were demolished by 2012, after the removal of the Sillogue flats. Balbutcher Lane were the last eight-storey flats to go in 2015.

== Fifteen-story flats ==
The Ballymun tower blocks were seven landmark residential towers built in the 1960s. The seven towers were named after the seven leaders of the 1916 rising; Patrick Pearse, Thomas MacDonagh, Seán Mac Diarmada, Éamonn Ceannt, Thomas Clarke, James Connolly, and Joseph Plunkett.

In 2004, demolition of the first tower began. The Pearse tower was demolished slowly by mechanical means, while MacDermott and MacDonagh Towers were demolished by controlled implosion. Ceannt, Plunkett, Clarke, and Connolly towers were demolished by mechanical means.

The red aircraft warning lights on these structures were not connected to any form of back-up power for many years, leaving the towers completely dark during any power outage.

Joseph Plunkett tower, along with Balbutcher Lane, got railings and an entrance around the perimeter of the building (buildings, counting Balbutcher Lane) in the 1990s.

=== Construction/demolition ===
- Patrick Pearse tower (1966–2004) was the first tower to be erected, in 1966. It was halfway through construction when the construction of MacDonagh Tower started. Pearse Tower was the first one to be demolished in 2004.
- Thomas MacDonagh tower (1966–2005) was the second tower, built in 1966, and in 2005 was demolished by controlled implosion. It was the third one to be demolished.
- Éamonn Ceannt tower (1966–2005) was the third tower, built in 1966; in 2005 it was demolished. It was the fourth one to be demolished.
- James Connolly tower (1966–2007) was the fourth tower, built in 1966. In 2007 it was demolished.
- Seán MacDermott tower (Seán Mac Diarmada) (1966–2005) was the fifth tower to be built, in 1966. In 2005, it was demolished by controlled implosion and collapsed in less than eight seconds. It was the second fifteen-storey to be demolished .
- Thomas Clarke tower (1966–2008) was the sixth tower, built in 1966. Four weeks before it was demolished in 2008, the top floor was turned into a short-stay hotel.
- Joseph Plunkett tower (1967–2015) was the last one built, in 1967. The tower's demolition began on 22 September 2015.

=== Gallery ===
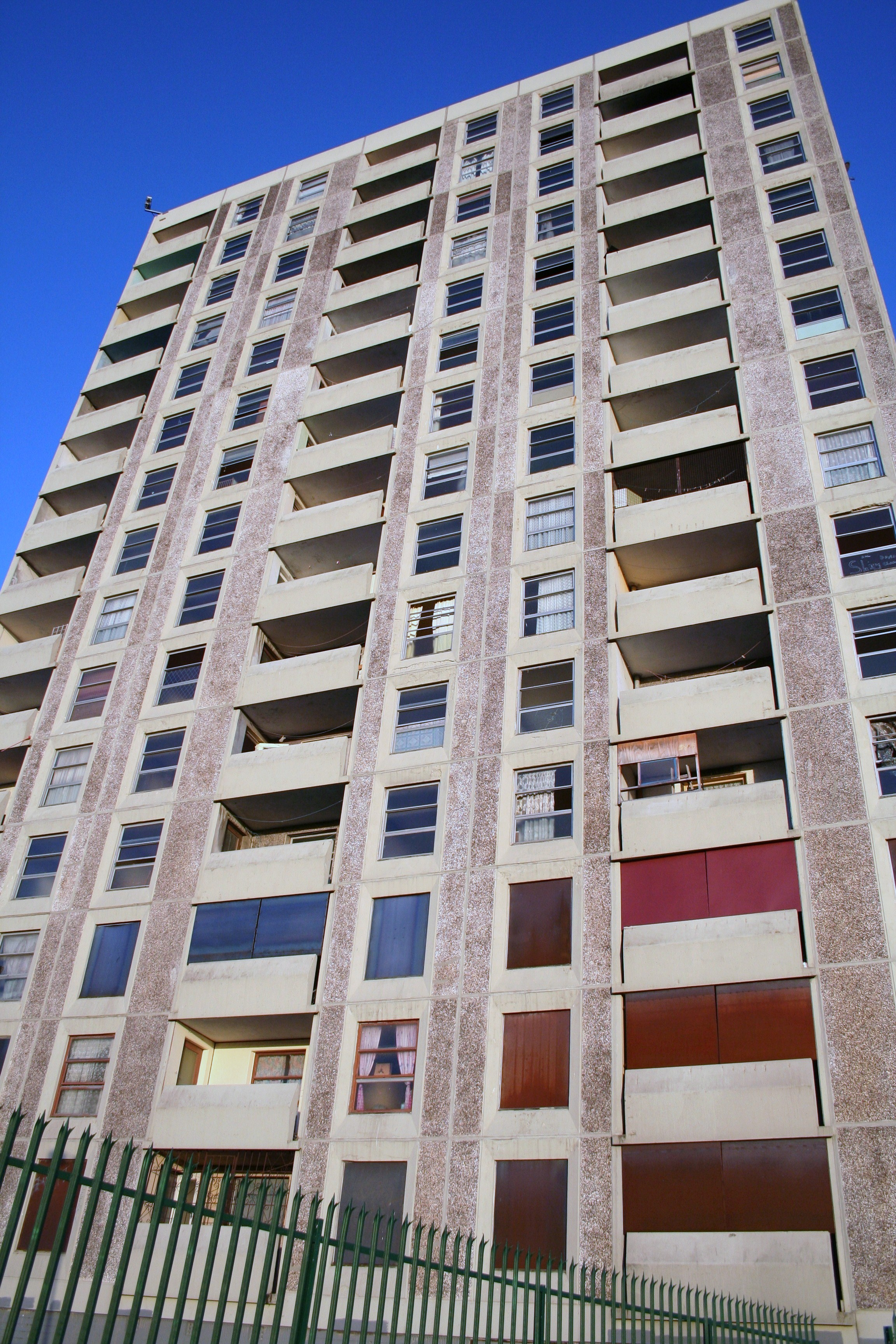
Connolly tower.

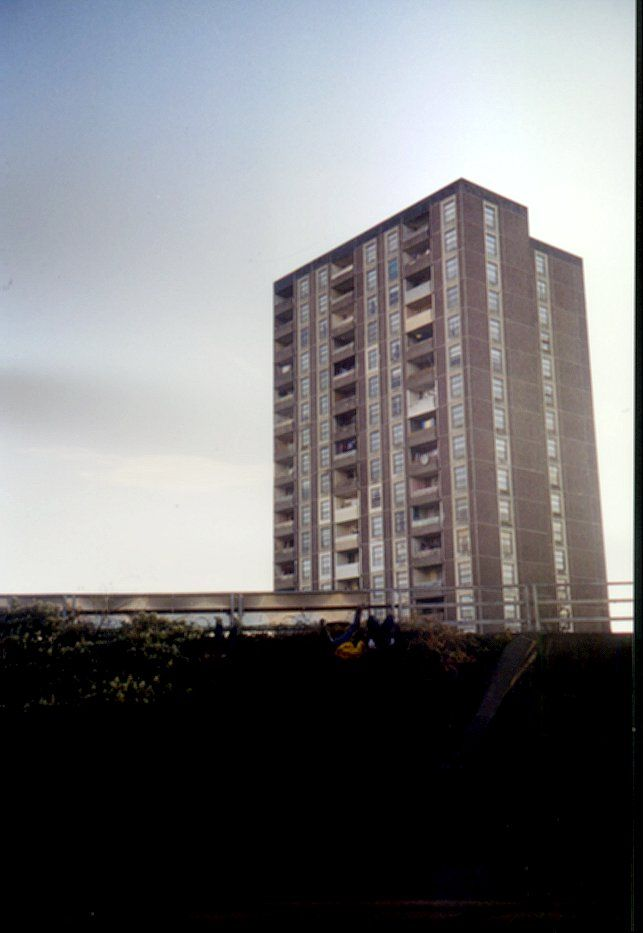
Ceannt tower.

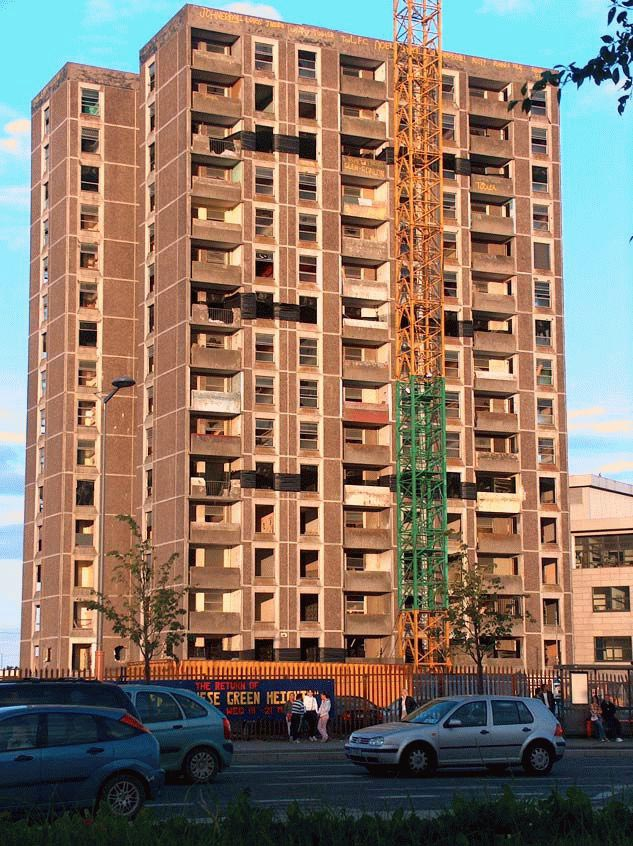
Thomas MacDonagh tower.

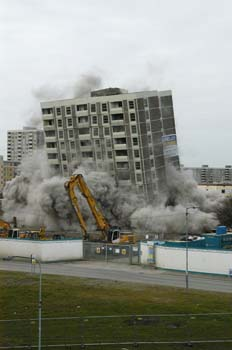
MacDermott tower being demolished in 2005.

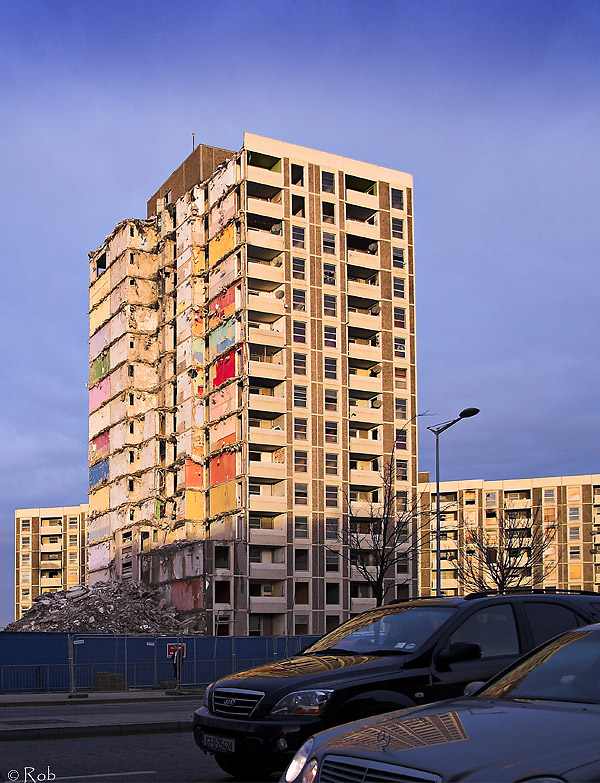
Clarke tower being demolished in 2008.

== In popular culture ==
Several films have used the flats as a filming location. Alan Parker's film adaptation of Roddy Doyle's novel The Commitments, and Into the West both used the flats as a backdrop.

=== U2 ===
The image from the fansite (Image is taken from the book Memories Milestones and New Horizons Reflections on the Regeneration of Ballymun)

The 1987 U2 song "Running to Stand Still" was inspired by Bono's view of the flats from his childhood home on Cedarwood Road, which has one end in Ballymun, and one in Finglas. Far-right columnist John Waters has described his house as being on the "faultline" between Finglas and Glasnevin. The line "I see seven towers, but I only see one way out" refers to Bono witnessing drug dealing and addiction and it reminding him of the flats. According to Sean Murphy, writing for the Southern Edition of the Sunday Independent, many Ballymunners (Note: Someone from Ballymun, also spelt as Ballymuner.) were honoured by the mention. In the book Memories Milestones and New Horizons Reflections on the Regeneration of Ballymun, Waters said that U2's origins in Finglas, Glasnevin and Ballymun were "crucial to what they would become", and that the quote from "Running to Stand Still" was the "most particular song [Bono] would write about his childhood in the shadow of the Irish Babel" [sic].

In 2004, after an unofficial U2 fan website called the area a 'bad area', warning "do NOT go here on foot" [sic], a spokesperson for Bono said that Bono is proud to be from Ballymun. The caption accompanies an image of a Ballymun flat taken from a car driving through Ballymun. In the aforementioned book, Irish poet John Montague starts his chapter by saying that the image and caption speaks volumes about Ballymun's negative perception.

In her book The Mun: Growing Up in Ballymun, Connolly was highly critical of Running to Stand Still. Connolly attributes the song to an "enormous [amount of] damage to the tenants' morale", calling the song 'bleak despair', and referring to the line "I see seven towers, but I only see one way out" as an ignorant remark from Bono. She also says "Bono never lived in Ballymun. And yet website after website says that is where he hails from. How can anyone possibly confuse Ballymun with Glasnevin?" [sic]. In The Construction of Dublin, McDonald interpreted the lyric "I see seven towers, but I only see one way out" as referring to the "only way out of Ballymun [being] via drugs", saying that "at least a thousand of the tenants were drug addicts".

=== Carry Me Down ===
M. J. Hyland's Booker-shortlisted novel Carry Me Down (2006), is set in Ballymun, with the main character John Egan moving from Gorey, County Wexford into the Ballymun tower blocks. Dermot Bolger, writing for the Irish Independent, criticised the book's depiction of Ballymun as being akin to someone who researched Ballymun in books that "record details like the fact that the heating could not be turned off by tenants or that people urinated in the lifts" as opposed to the reality of 1970s Ballymun.

=== The Ballymun Trilogy ===
The Ballymun Trilogy (2011), is a collection of three plays by poet and playwright Bolger set in Ballymun and the Ballymun flats, consisting of From These Green Heights (2004), The Townlands of Brazil (2006), and The Consequences of Lightning (2008). From These Green Heights focuses on a family being relocated from Gardiner Street to become of the flats' first tenants, one of the family members named Dessie is in a relationship with another of the flats' first tenants named Marie who moved to the flats from Glasnevin after her father left her mother, with the play following their relationship and the birth of their child in Ballymun; The Townlands of Brazil, focuses on tailor's daughter Eileen fleeing to England with her child Matthew to avoid putting him up for adoption after she gets pregnant by a Ballymunner named Michael, who then dies in a construction accident, with the play then focusing on Matthew returning to Ballymun when he is older as someone helping demolishing the flats, with a Polish immigrant named Monika living in the site where his mother formerly resided; and The Consequences of Lightning, focuses on the funeral of the flats' first tenant Sam, who comments on the attendees of the funeral as a ghost.

In November 2004, Fintan O'Toole, writing for The Irish Times praised From These Green Heights' "perfect expression of the chastened, watchful kind of hope" that people who are often "let down so badly so often [have]", while noting that the "story of almost 40 years" ideally would've been a series of plays (Note: This review came before the other two plays were commissioned) to avoid the inevitability of some moments "moving too rapidly to be properly realised", with some dialogue having 'clunky exposition'. In the book, Literary visions of multicultural Ireland: The immigrant in contemporary Irish literature, Paula Murphy considered The Townlands of Brazil to be asking Ballymunners and Irish society as a whole to "re-imagine their personal and national histories in new historical, social, and cultural frameworks". In 2006, Karen Fricker reviewing The Townlands of Brazil for The Guardian, said that Bolger clearly had 'too many stories to tell', and that the play would've been better as a dramaturg, though still felt the play was 'consistently intriguing and engaging', hoping that more plays like it would be made in the future. In her book Irish Contemporary Landscapes in Literature and the Arts, Marie Mianowski says The Consequences of Lightning could be assessed as a "melodramatic summary of the stormy history of Ballymun [...] characterized by the strained relations between the protagonists".

== See also ==
- Cromcastle Court flats – The last prefabricated concrete building in Dublin
- Pruitt–Igoe – Now demolished high-rise joint urban housing projects in St. Louis, Missouri, United States
- Cabrini–Green Homes – High-rise public housing project in Chicago, Illinois, United States
- Divis Tower – Last tower of a demolished flats complex in Belfast, Northern Ireland
- Red Road Flats – Now demolished high-rise housing complex in Balornock and Barmulloch in Glasgow, Scotland
- Broadwater Farm – Area in Tottenham, North London, England dominated by high density Corbusian housing experiment
- Towers in the park – Morphology of modernist high rise apartment buildings characterized by a high-rise building surrounded by landscaped land
- Ballymun Shopping Centre – Demolished shopping centre in Ballymun constructed in the 1960s
- Oliver Bond flats – Block of flats in Dublin named after Oliver Bond, a member of the Society of United Irishmen from Ulster
- Bunka Apartments – Now demolished block of flats in Ochanomizu, Tokyo, Japan that were intended to introduce a foreign style of building into Japan

== Bibliography ==
- Libreri, Samantha; Kinsella, Darren (14 November 2012). Finglas: A People's Portrait. New Island Books. ISBN 978-1848402034.
- Power, Anne (1997). Estates on the Edge: The Social consequences of Mass Housing in Northern Europe. Palgrave Macmillan. ISBN 0-333-67463-4. Archived from the original on 30 June 2026.
- McCrann, Aibhlín; Prichard, David; Ó Broin, Deiric; Power, Anne; King, Ronan; Montague, John; Stewart, Duncan; Tierney, John; Davies, Anna; Wyse Jackson, Peter; Cuffe, Ciarán; Whyte, Gerry; Ballagh, Robert; Ryan, Michele; Bolger, Dermot; Munck, Ronnie; Waters, John (2008). Memories Milestones and New Horizons Reflections on the Regeneration of Ballymun. Belfast, Northern Ireland: Blackstaff Press. ISBN 978-0-85640-835-9.
  - McCrann, Aibhlín (2008). "Editor's Note". Memories, Milestones and New Horizons Reflections on the Regeneration of Ballymun. Belfast, Northern Ireland: Blackstaff Press. p. vii. ISBN 978-0-85640-835-9.
  - Murray, Ciarán (2008). "Foreword". Memories, Milestones and New Horizons Reflections on the Regeneration of Ballymun. Belfast, Northern Ireland: Blackstaff Press. p. ix. ISBN 978-0-85640-835-9.
  - Prichard, David (2008). "Open Heart Surgery, E10 and the Emerging Sixth". Memories, Milestones and New Horizons Reflections on the Regeneration of Ballymun. Belfast, Northern Ireland: Blackstaff Press. pp. 1–26. ISBN 978-0-85640-835-9.
  - Power, Anne (2008). "Rebuilding Ballymun". Memories, Milestones and New Horizons Reflections on the Regeneration of Ballymun. Belfast, Northern Ireland: Blackstaff Press. pp. 27–44. ISBN 978-0-85640-835-9.
  - Montague, John (2008). "The Architecture of Ballymun". Memories, Milestones and New Horizons Reflections on the Regeneration of Ballymun. Belfast, Northern Ireland: Blackstaff Press. pp. 45–76. ISBN 978-0-85640-835-9.
  - Tierney, John (2008). "Driving the Vision of Regeneration". Memories, Milestones and New Horizons Reflections on the Regeneration of Ballymun. Belfast, Northern Ireland: Blackstaff Press. pp. 77–92. ISBN 978-0-85640-835-9.
  - Wyse Jackson, Peter (2008). "The Greening of Ballymun". Memories, Milestones and New Horizons Reflections on the Regeneration of Ballymun. Belfast, Northern Ireland: Blackstaff Press. pp. 93–114. ISBN 978-0-85640-835-9.
  - Whyte, Gerry (2008). "Providing Effective Access to Legal Services". Memories, Milestones and New Horizons Reflections on the Regeneration of Ballymun. Belfast, Northern Ireland: Blackstaff Press. pp. 115–136. ISBN 978-0-85640-835-9.
  - Michele, Ryan (2008). "When All is Said and Done". Memories, Milestones and New Horizons Reflections on the Regeneration of Ballymun. Belfast, Northern Ireland: Blackstaff Press. pp. 137–152. ISBN 978-0-85640-835-9.
  - Munck, Ronnie; Ó Broin, Deiric (2008). "Bridging the 'Town and Gown' Divide". Memories, Milestones and New Horizons Reflections on the Regeneration of Ballymun. Belfast, Northern Ireland: Blackstaff Press. pp. 153–166. ISBN 978-0-85640-835-9.
  - King, Ronan (2008). "Fostering an Enterprise Culture in Ballymun". Memories, Milestones and New Horizons Reflections on the Regeneration of Ballymun. Belfast, Northern Ireland: Blackstaff Press. pp. 167–182. ISBN 978-0-85640-835-9.
  - Duncan, Stewart (2008). "Ballymun: Future-proofing with a Green Community". Memories, Milestones and New Horizons Reflections on the Regeneration of Ballymun. Belfast, Northern Ireland: Blackstaff Press. pp. 183–190. ISBN 978-0-85640-835-9.
  - Davies, Anna (2008). "Linking Urban Regeneration and Sustainable Development". Memories, Milestones and New Horizons Reflections on the Regeneration of Ballymun. Belfast, Northern Ireland: Blackstaff Press. pp. 191–206. ISBN 978-0-85640-835-9.
  - Cuffe, Ciarán (2008). "Ballymun: A New Town Once Again". Memories, Milestones and New Horizons Reflections on the Regeneration of Ballymun. Belfast, Northern Ireland: Blackstaff Press. pp. 207–222. ISBN 978-0-85640-835-9.
  - Ballagh, Robert (2008). "A Horse of a Different Colour". Memories, Milestones and New Horizons Reflections on the Regeneration of Ballymun. Belfast, Northern Ireland: Blackstaff Press. pp. 223–240. ISBN 978-0-85640-835-9.
  - Bolger, Dermot (2008). "Heights and Consequences". Memories, Milestones and New Horizons Reflections on the Regeneration of Ballymun. Belfast, Northern Ireland: Blackstaff Press. pp. 241–258. ISBN 978-0-85640-835-9.
  - Waters, John (2008). "The National Memory Town". Memories, Milestones and New Horizons Reflections on the Regeneration of Ballymun. Belfast, Northern Ireland: Blackstaff Press. pp. 259–277. ISBN 978-0-85640-835-9.
- Somerville-Woodward, Dr. Robert (2002). Ballymun A History Volumes I&2 c.1600 - 1997 Synopsis (PDF). Stormanstown House (Ballymun Library), Ballymun Road, Dublin 9, Rep. of Ireland: Ballymun Regeneration Limited. ISBN 0-9544260-0-2. Archived from the original on 19 October 2013.
- Connolly, Lynn (12 September 2006). The Mun: Growing Up in Ballymun. Ballymun, Dublin, Ireland: Gill Books. ISBN 978-0717140428. Archived from the original on 21 February 2012.
- McDonald, Frank (1989). Saving the City How to halt the desctruction of Dublin. Bloom House, 78 Eccles Street, Dublin 7: Tomar Publishing Ltd. ISBN 1-871793-03-3.
- McDonald, Frank (17 May 2000). The Construction of Dublin. Cork, Ireland: Gandon Editions. ISBN 978-0946846498.
- Villar-Argáiz, Pilar (2013). Literary visions of multicultural Ireland: The immigrant in contemporary Irish literature. Manchester University Press. ISBN 978-1-78499-211-8.
  - Villar-Argáiz, Pilar (2013). "Introduction: the immigrant in contemporary Irish literature". Literary visions of multicultural Ireland: The immigrant in contemporary Irish literature. Manchester University Press. pp. 1–33. ISBN 978-1-78499-211-8.
  - Murphy, Paula (2013). "'Marooned men in foreign cities': encounters with the other in Dermot Bolger's The Ballymun Trilogy". Literary visions of multicultural Ireland: The immigrant in contemporary Irish literature (PDF). Manchester University Press. pp. 51–162. ISBN 978-1-78499-211-8.
- Mianowski, Marie (2012). Mianowski, Marie (ed.). Irish Contemporary Landscapes in Literature and the Arts. Palgrave Macmillan. doi:10.1057/9780230360297. hdl:11089/11625. ISBN 978-0-230-31939-4.
