= Ballymun Shopping Centre =

Demolished shopping centre in Ballymun, Dublin City

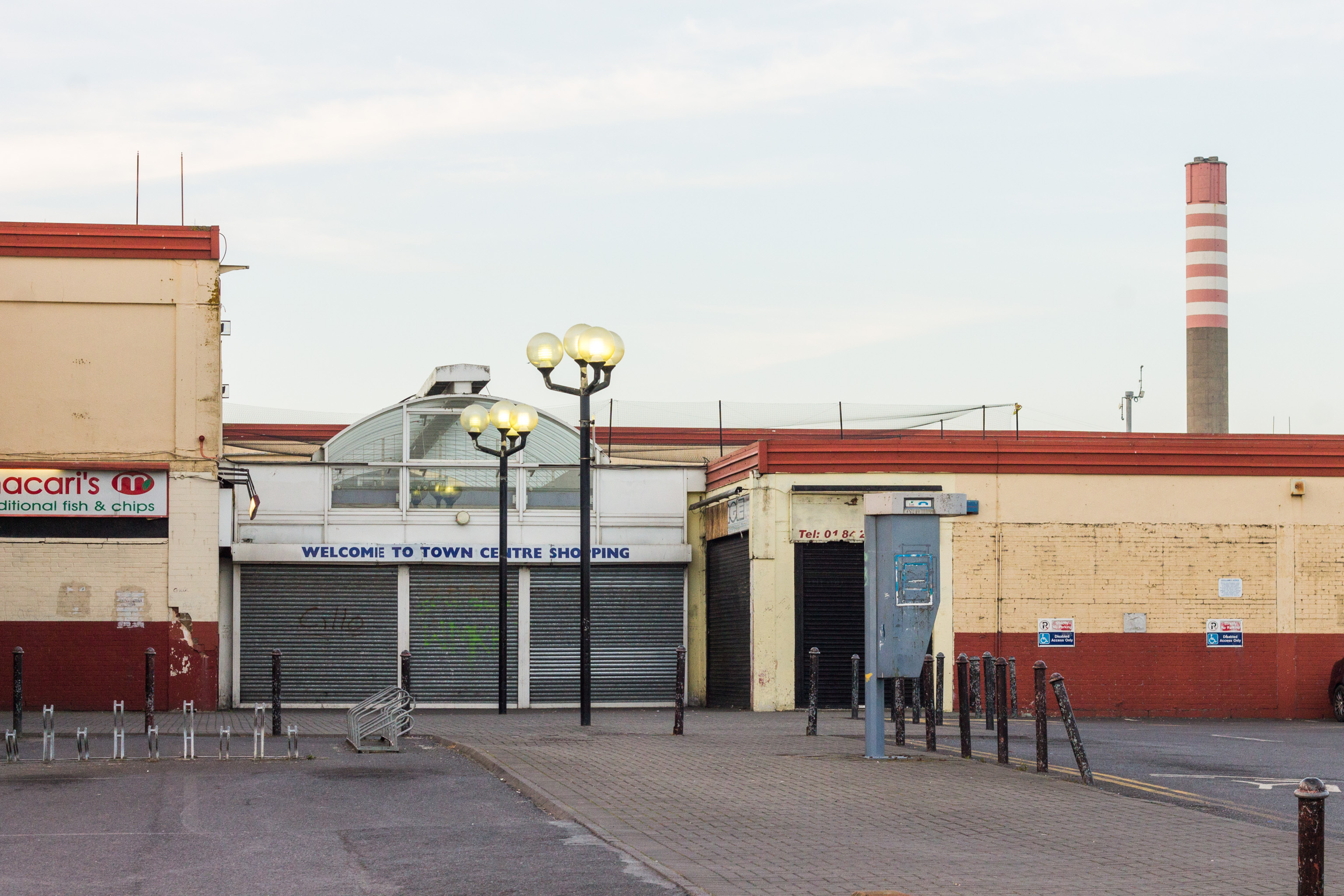
- Ballymun Shopping Centre's south wing entrance
- Location: Ballymun, Dublin, Ireland
- Coordinates: 53°23′46″N 6°15′58″W
- Opened: 14 April 1969
- Renovated: 25 October 1994
- Closed: 2018
- Previous names: Ballymun Estate Shopping Centre
- Developer: Ballymun Development Ltd.

The Ballymun Shopping Centre (Note: Also known as the Seven Towers Shopping Centre, and various permutations of Ballymun Town Shopping Centre) was a shopping centre in Ballymun, on the Northside of Dublin, Ireland. Built in April 1969, it was one of Ireland's first shopping centres and was Dublin's second shopping centre. The building also contained a pub called The Towers Pub, and a swimming pool.

The shopping centre was shut down in 2018, and was demolished in 2021. Before its demolition, it was considered by Dublin Inquirer and The Irish Times to be the last relic of 1960s Ballymun. The only traces of the centre remaining are an Easter Rising mural and some of its parking spaces. The lack of any redevelopment, and the ultimate demolition of the centre, has been described by The Irish Times as "the single biggest broken promise to Ballymun" and a milestone in the failure of Ballymun's Regeneration.

== History ==
A lease for a shopping centre "in the Ballymun project" was approved by the Planning and Development Committee of Dublin City Council on 29 January 1969 to be built by Ballymun Development Ltd., a Sisk Properties company. The centre was officially opened on 14 April 1969, making it Dublin's second shopping centre and one of Ireland's first. It cost £900,000 to complete. The following year, in May, Córas Iompair Éireann requested planning permission to build a bus shelter at the Ballymun Shopping Centre.

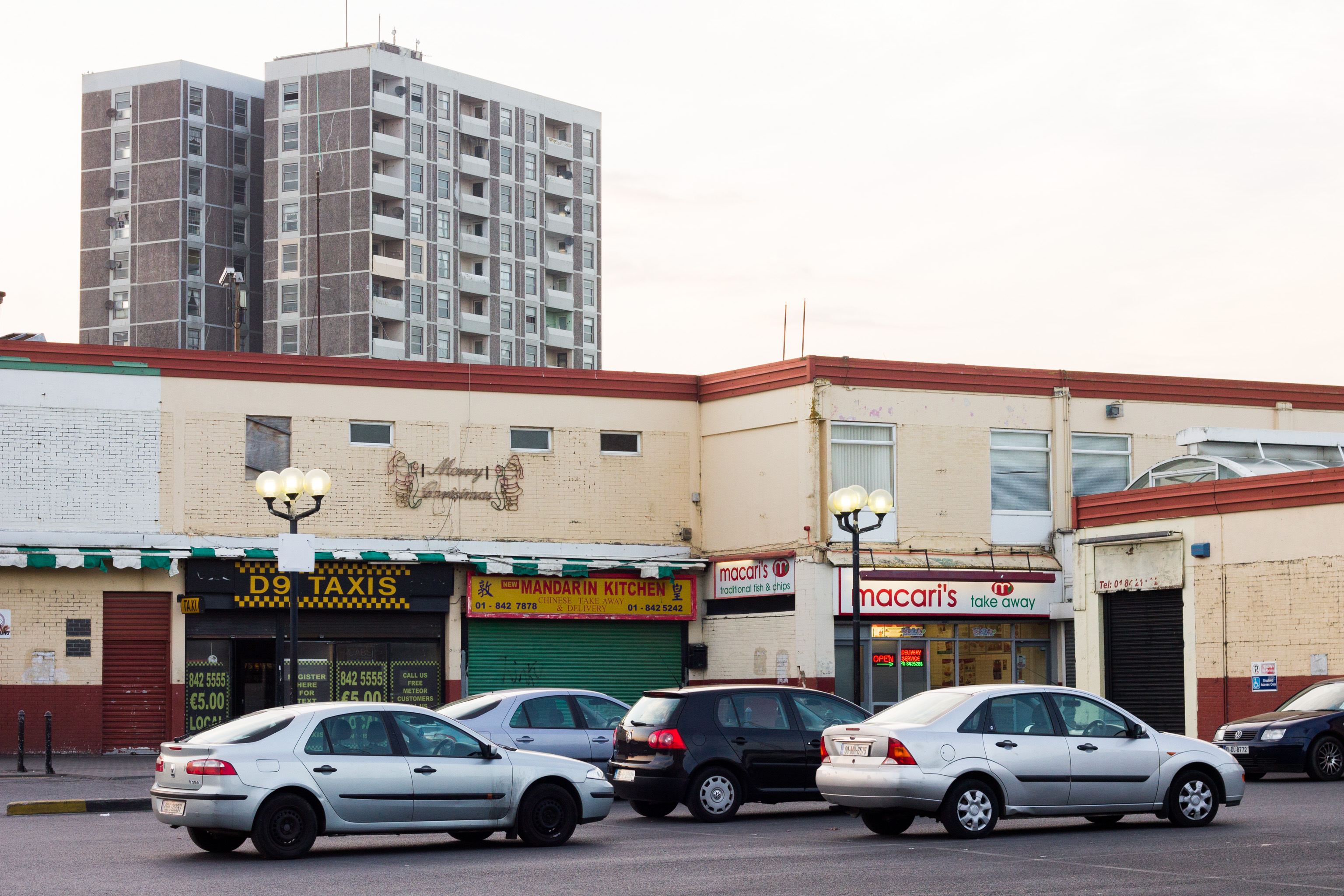
The Ballymun Shopping Centre's car park

In February 1979, a new taxi rank was established at Ballymun Shopping Centre, as part of two and a half year campaign by the Irish Taxi Federation. In February 1988, the Ballymun Traders' Association reported that the Ballymun Shopping Centre was in a "much poorer state of repair than other centres because of the lack of investment" and that it was in high need of a refurbishment or renovation. The following year, Dublin Corporation negotiated and announced a £1 million deal with Ballymun Developments to renovate the Ballymun Shopping Centre, which would have been the centre's first major improvement. However, no work was started on the renovation, as the two entities had not decided who much each entity should pay for it. In June 1990, the Ballymun Traders' Association started a rent strike after Dublin Corporation still had not started work on the refurbishment, noting that customers would start to go to a planned shopping centre in Santry due to the current state of the centre. In September 1991, Ballymun Development Ltd bought out Irish Life and Dublin Corporation's interest and agreed to refurbish the shopping centre over the next year for £1 million.

In March 1993, former Fine Gael TD Mary Flaherty reported that former Minister for Finance, Bertie Ahern had approved the Ballymun Shopping Centre for designated area status. In April 1994, Ballymun Development Ltd. started work on the refurbishment. The work was nearly halted until January by Dublin Corporation to prevent the renovations from interfering with Christmas trading, but this decision was criticised by Dublin City councillors, with refurbishments being finished three days later. In January 1996, Dublin City councillors reported that illegal van shops were "threatening the future" of the centre.

In August 2001, Treasury Holdings purchased Ballymun Shopping Centre and announced that in partnership with Dublin Corporation they would "undertake a major redevelopment of Ballymun Shopping Centre" as part of the Ballymun Regeneration. 2 years later, in July 2003, Treasury Holdings finalised the blueprint for a €300m redevelopment of the shopping centre in Ballymun, gaining planning permission from Dublin Corporation's successor Dublin City Council later that year in November. Work was due to be started on the redevelopment in June 2005; however, due to a disagreement between Treasury Holdings and Ballymun Regeneration limited, a limited company set up by Dublin City Council to develop and implement a masterplan for Ballymun, on how much the land occupying the Ballymun Shopping Centre was worth, no work started on the centre. In October 2012, Treasury Holdings went bankrupt.

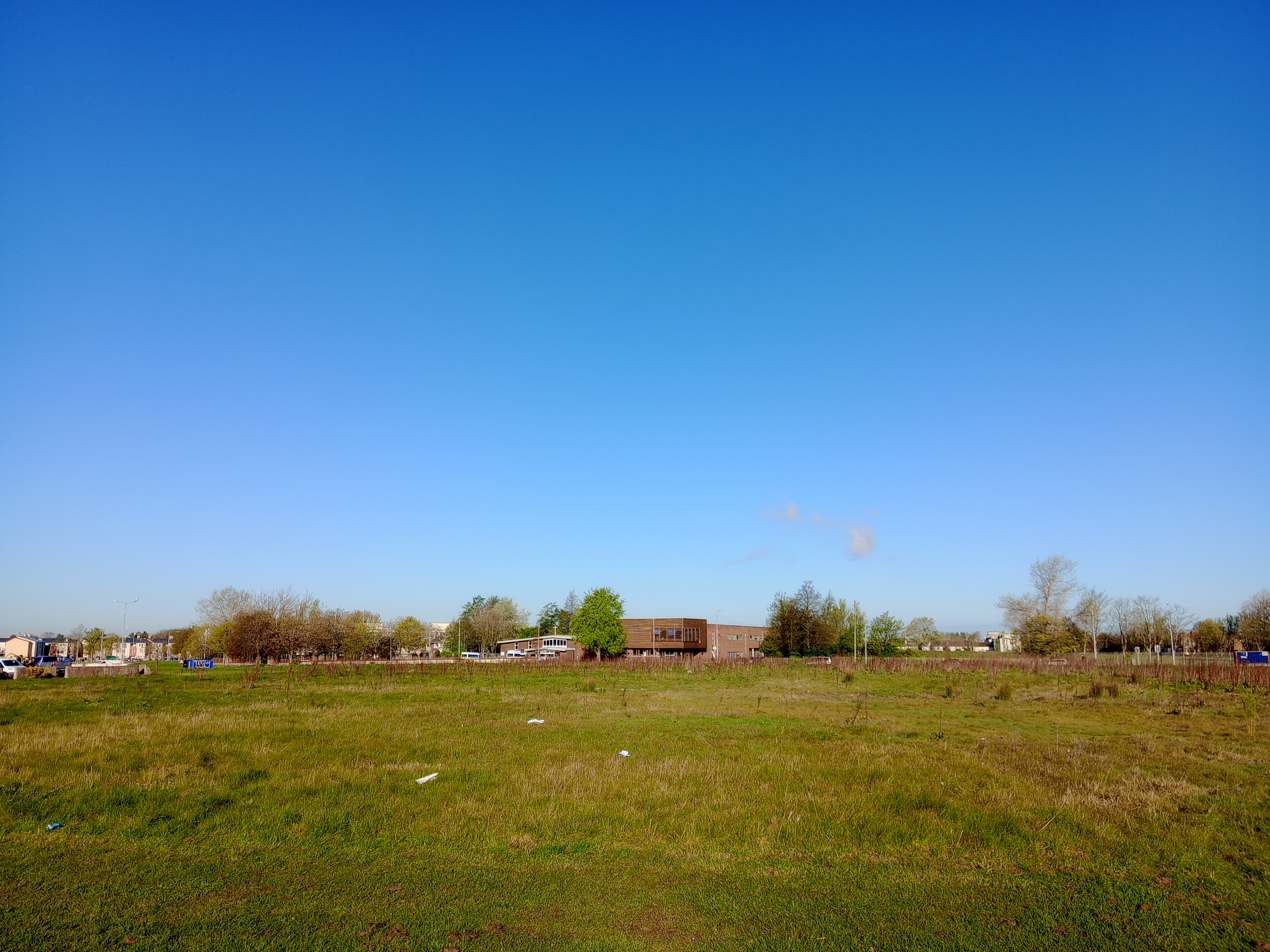
The former Ballymun Shopping Centre site in 2026

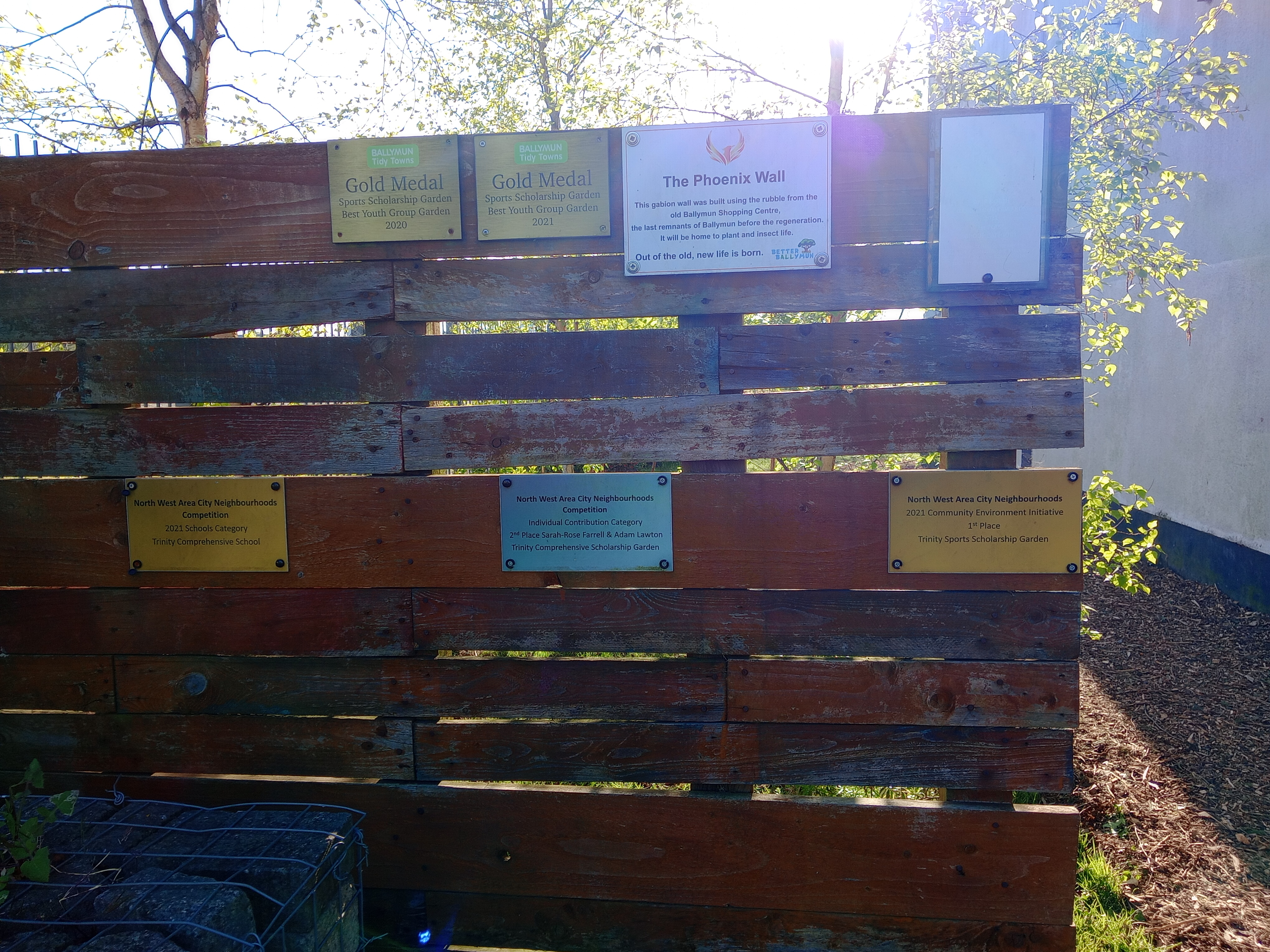
Gabion wall made out of rubble from the Ballymun Shopping Centre

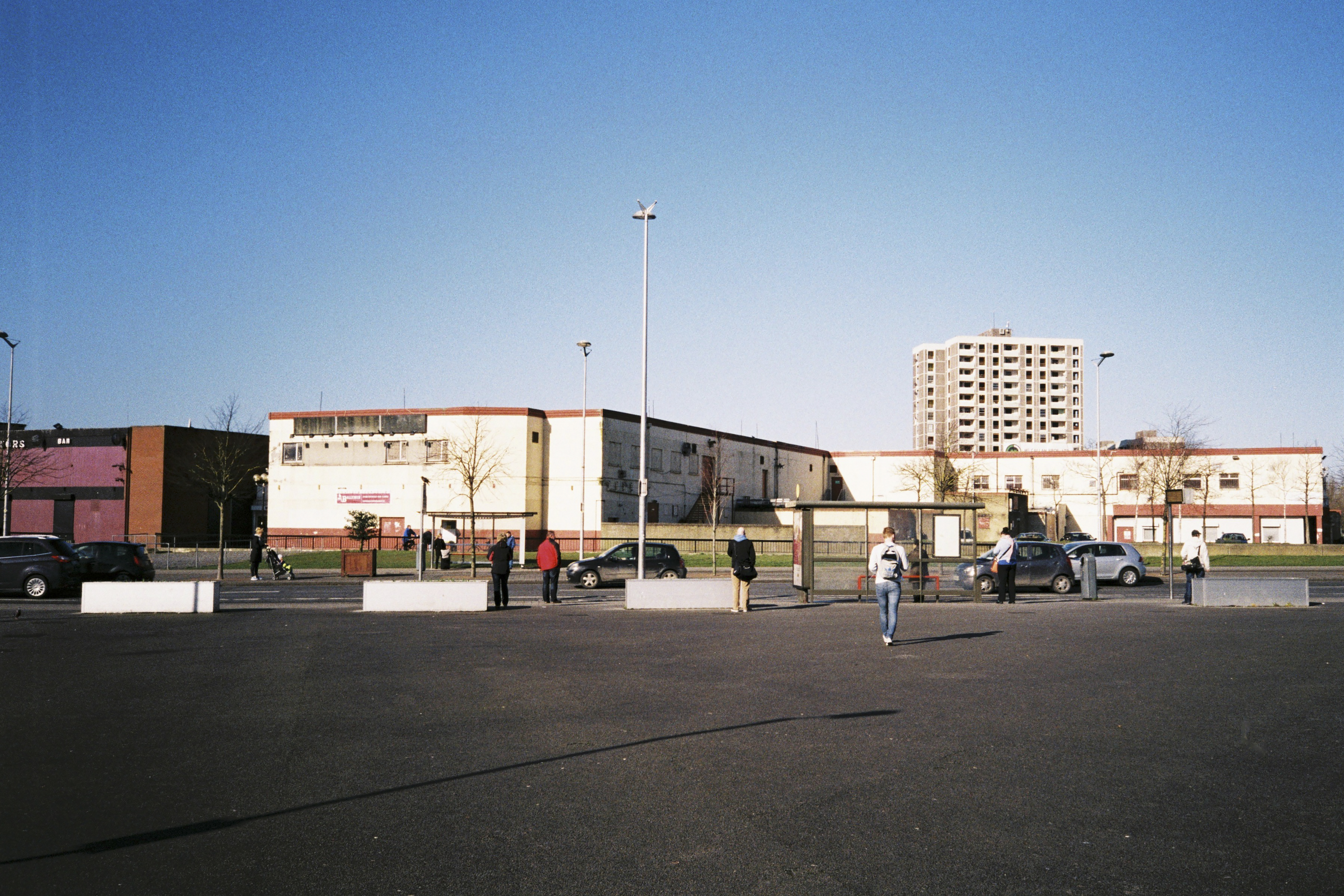
The Ballymun Shopping Centre's west wing, with The Towers Pub visible on the left

In April 2014, Tesco, which was the anchor store of the Ballymun Shopping Centre, pulled out because the company felt that "Ballymun Shopping Centre is on its last legs". In July 2014, Sunday World described Ballymun Shopping Centre as one of Ireland's "Seven Wonders". In 2014, The Towers Pub was used as a set for the 5th season of RTÉ's crime drama series Love/Hate. In September 2014, The Towers Pub was sold to Dublin City Council, who closed it for good. By February 2015, few shops remained in the Ballymun Shopping Centre, as Dublin City Council had stopped renewing their leases with the tenants. Sinn Féin Councillor Noeleen Reilly said she "would have expected at this stage that some sort of alternative shopping facility for the people of the area would have been set in motion [...] Unfortunately this is not the case". Later that year, in June a fire broke out in a vacant unit adjacent to The Towers Pub. Speaking to The Herald and the Irish Independent, the Dublin Fire Brigade stated "There were no injuries reported and it was unclear how the blaze broke out".

The shopping centre closed down in 2018 after the last shop left on Christmas 2017. In March 2018, Dublin City Council announced their plans to demolish the building after the decision was approved by city councillors. Demolition work started in September 2019, with heavy demolition work starting in June 2020. The centre was fully demolished in 2021. The Irish Times described the shopping centres demolition as "the single biggest broken promise to Ballymun" and considered it a milestone in the failure of Ballymun's Regeneration, with both The Irish Times and Dublin Inquirer describing the shopping centre as the last relic of 1960s Ballymun.

In April 2022, Dublin City council started looking for a new developer to "overhaul" the former Ballymun Shopping Centre site with plans to turn it into residential housing and a station for Dublin's proposed Metrolink. In 2024, Dublin City Council entered into talks with the Land Development Agency (LDA) about building housing on the former Ballymun Shopping Centre site. after calls from Dublin TD Paul McAuliffe in January. In January 2025, McAuliffe said he was "losing patience" with Dublin City Council's "lack of progress being made on the derelict Ballymun Shopping Centre site". At the start of July 2026, the LDA announced a new proposal to build 564 Cost Rental apartments as part of a Large-scale Residential Development called Silloge Road LRD. They held a public consultation on the proposal in Axis Ballymun on 15 July. Local politician Conor Reddy urged people to participate in the consultation.

The only parts of the centre still remaining today are an Easter Rising mural that was on The Towers Pub, and 216 of its 395 parking spaces.

== Ballymun Swimming Pool ==
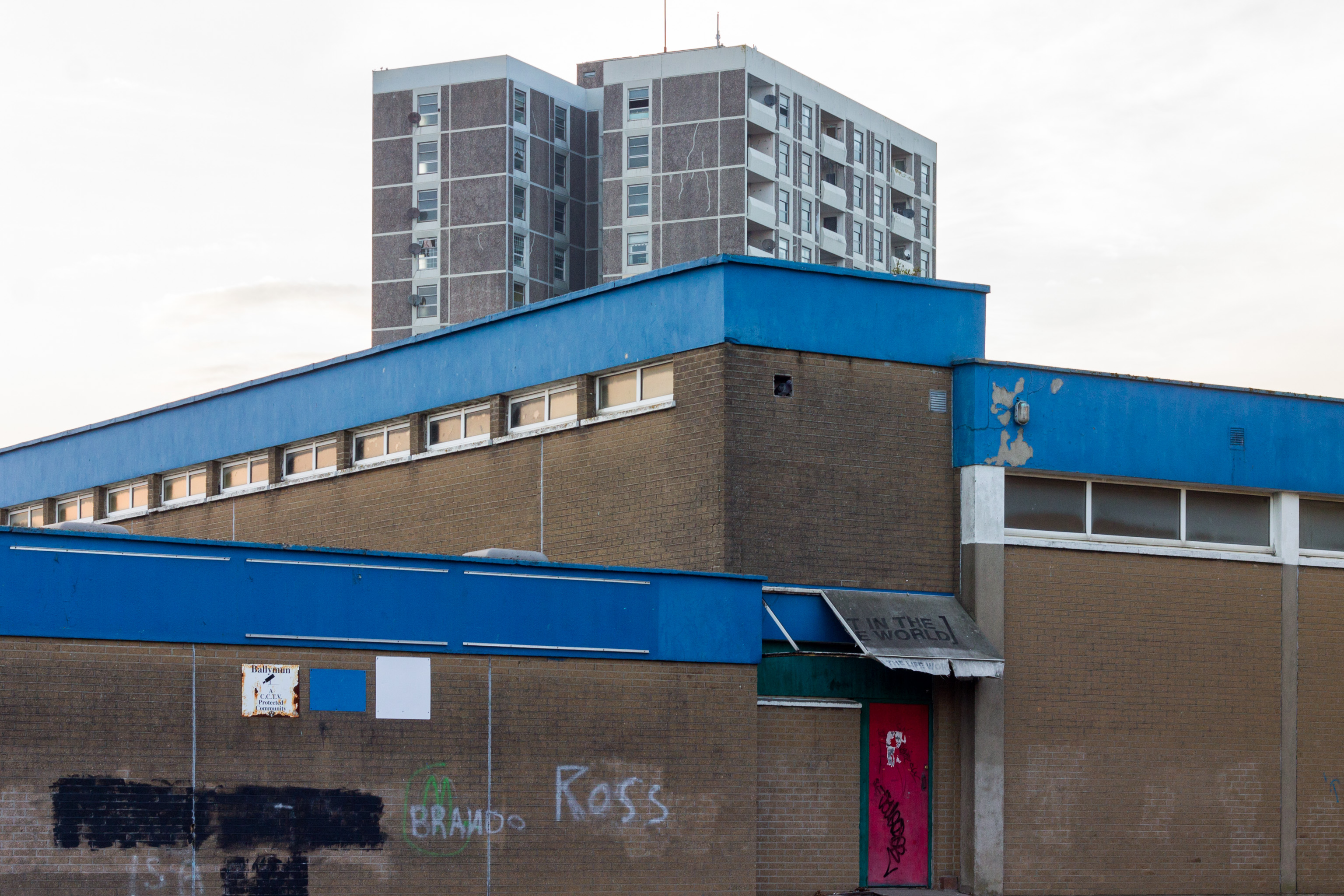
The Old Ballymun Swimming Pool in 2014

The shopping centre had a 25m swimming pool run by Dublin Corporation known as the Ballymun Swimming Pool, which was later called the Old Swimming Pool and the Old Ballymun Swimming Pool, as Ballymun had acquired another facility with a pool, called the Ballymun Sports and Fitness Centre. The swimming pool had a swimming team called the Ballymun Girls Club, swimming classes called "Mother and Toddler" organised by the City of Dublin Vocational Education Committee, and an annual triathlon.

=== History ===
The site was initially planned to have a swimming pool and community centre, but these plans were blocked by Dublin Corporation, who moved the pool to a site near Éamonn Ceannt tower and announced that "the Community Centre may be sited elsewhere". The decision to move the pool caused several people from the Ballymun Estate Tenants' Association to protest at the site originally allocated for the pool, causing damage to the site and threatening to "undo any work which was completed during the day, this evening" a spokesperson for the tenant's organization said that that they "would not interfere with the workers who are laying out a car park on the site". These protests caused Ballymun Development Ltd. to file a malicious damages claim against the association. In March 1972, Dublin Corporation applied for and were approved for full planning permission from Dublin County Council to build a pool at Ballymun Shopping Centre, alongside two other pools in Ballyfermot and Finglas after protests from the Ballyfermot Community Association. The three pools cost £384,000 to build, with the Ballymun Swimming Pool reaching completion in November 1974. Dublin City Council shut the pool down on 26 June 2005. In 2008, the swimming pool was temporarily turned into an art gallery called 'Art in the LifeWorld' by the Ballymun art group Breaking Ground. The swimming pool was demolished in April 2016.
