= Sixmilecross railway station =

Railway station in Northern Ireland

Sixmilecross

General information
- Location: Sixmilecross, County Tyrone, Northern Ireland; UK

History
- Original company: Portadown, Dungannon and Omagh Junction Railway
- Post-grouping: Great Northern Railway

Key dates
- 1 January 1863: Station opens
- 10 June 1965: Station closes
Location

Sixmilecross railway station served Sixmilecross in County Tyrone in Northern Ireland.

The Portadown, Dungannon and Omagh Junction Railway opened the station on 1 January 1863. In 1876 it was taken over by the Great Northern Railway.

It closed on 15 February 1965.

== Routes ==
Preceding station	Disused railways	Following station
Carrickmore (Tyrone)	Portadown, Dungannon and Omagh Junction Railway; Portadown to Omagh	Beragh
