= Beragh =

Village in County Tyrone, Northern Ireland

Coordinates: 54.55°N 7.167°W

Beragh: Irish: Bearach
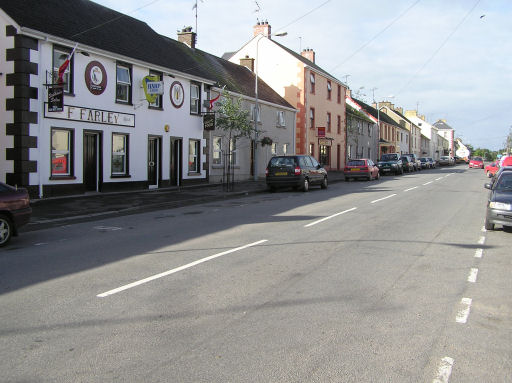

- Location within Northern Ireland
- Population: 694 (2021 census)
  - Belfast: 49 mi (79 km)
- District: Fermanagh and Omagh
- County: County Tyrone
- Country: Northern Ireland
- Sovereign state: United Kingdom
- Post town: OMAGH
- Postcode district: BT79
- Dialling code: 028
- UK Parliament: West Tyrone
- NI Assembly: West Tyrone

Beragh (from Irish: Bearach, meaning "place of points/hills/standing stones") is a village and townland in County Tyrone, Northern Ireland. It is about 8 miles (13 kilometres) southeast of Omagh and is in the Fermanagh and Omagh District Council area. The 2021 census recorded a population of 694.

== History ==
One of the first known references to the village was on a 1690 Plantation map of Ireland. In the 1820s this village, the property of Earl Belmore, was described as having "one long wide street of very mean houses whose tenants for the most part appear to be poor". The inhabitants mostly worked in trade and agriculture. In 1841 the population was 617, the village having 103 houses. The village had a market patent granted under the name "Lowrystown".

The Portadown, Dungannon and Omagh Junction Railway opened Beragh railway station on 2 September 1861. The Ulster Transport Authority closed the station and the PD&O line on 15 February 1965.

== Demography ==
=== 19th century population ===
The population of the village decreased during the 19th century:

Year	1841	1851	1861	1871	1881	1891
Population	219	155	170	119	121	109
Houses	44	35	33	33	28	31

=== 21st century population ===
Beragh is classified as a small village or hamlet by the Northern Ireland Statistics and Research Agency (NISRA) (i.e. with a population between 500 and 1,000 people). On census day in 2001, 29 April 2001, there were 520 people living in Beragh. Of these:

- 28.5% were aged under 16 years;
- 18.1% were aged 60 and over;
- the average age was 34.3 years (NI average age 35.8 years);
- 47.5% of the population were male and 52.5% were female;
- 62.8% were from a Catholic Community Background;
- 35.4% were from a Protestant and Other Christian (including Christian related)' Community Background;
- 6.3% were born outside Northern Ireland; and
- 0.0% were from an ethnic group other than white.

== Sport ==
- Beragh Red Knights is the local Gaelic football club.
- Beragh Swifts F.C. is the local football club which as of season 2024/25 plays in the Fermanagh & Western 1st Division, with its reserve team playing in the 1st Division of the F&W Reserve League.

== Beragh townland ==
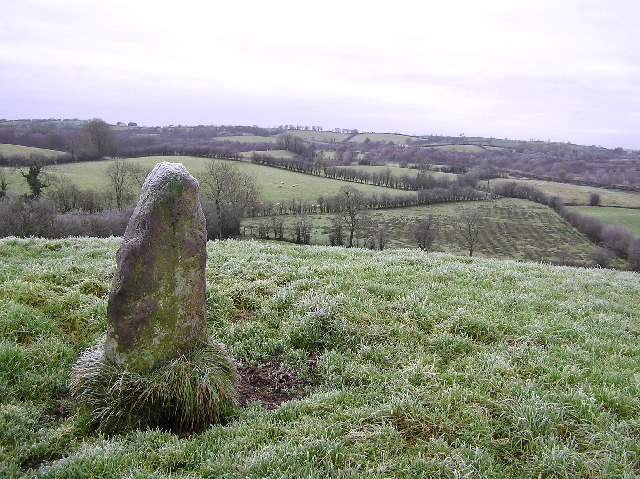
Standing stone in Beragh townland, 2005

The townland of Beragh is situated in the historic barony of Omagh East and the civil parish of Clogherny and covers an area of 481 acres.

The population of the townland declined during the 19th century:

Year	1841	1851	1861	1871	1881	1891
Population	216	112	128	60	55	65
Houses	40	22	21	13	16	14

The village of Beragh is in the townland of the same name and in 1891 had an area of 17 acres.

== See also ==
- List of townlands of County Tyrone
- List of archaeological sites in County Tyrone
