= Carrickmore railway station (Northern Ireland) =

Railway station in County Tyrone, Northern Ireland

Coordinates: 54.5815°N 7.0349°W

Carrickmore
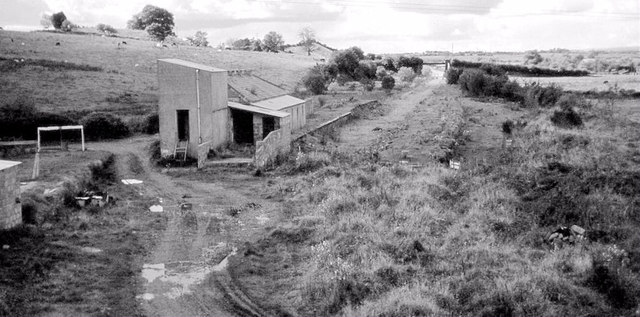
- The former railway station at Carrickmore on 20 October 1974.

General information
- Location: Carrickmore, County Tyrone, Northern Ireland; UK

History
- Original company: Portadown, Dungannon and Omagh Junction Railway
- Post-grouping: Great Northern Railway

Key dates
- 2 September 1861: Station opens
- 15 February 1965: Station closes
Location
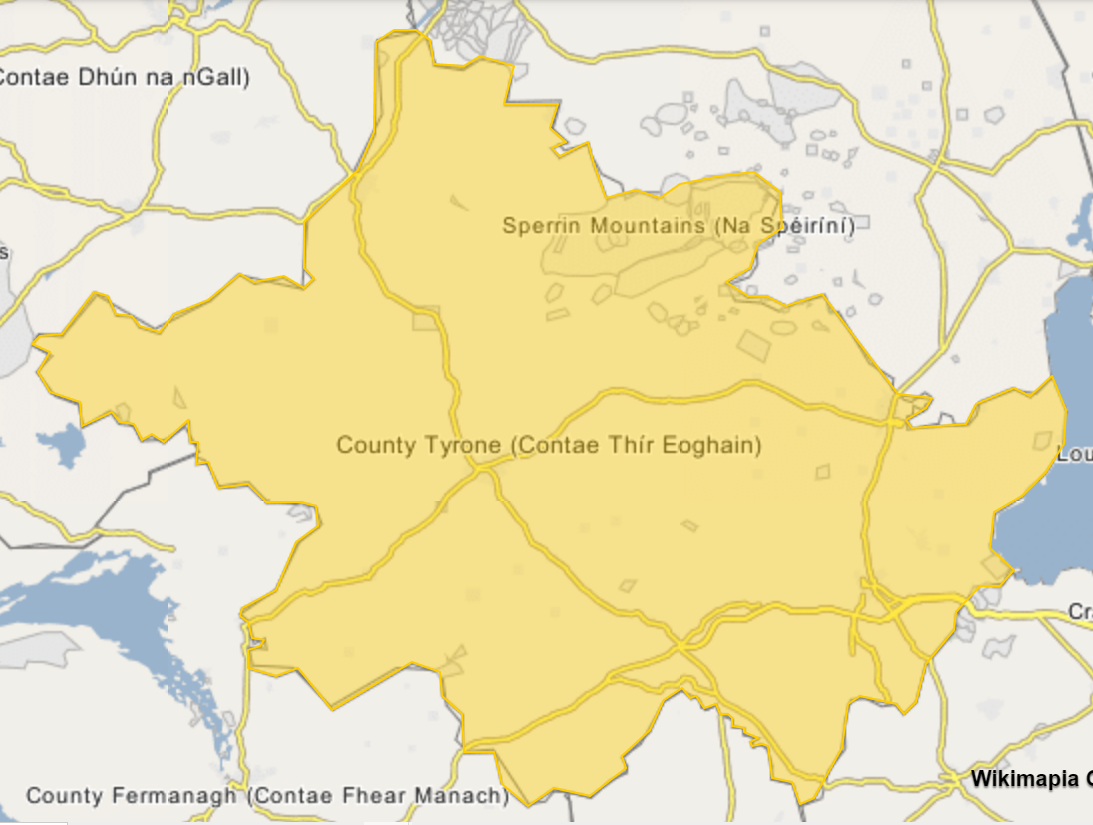
- Location within County Tyrone Location within Northern Ireland

Carrickmore railway station served Carrickmore in County Tyrone, Northern Ireland. The Portadown, Dungannon and Omagh Junction Railway opened the station on 2 September 1861. In 1876 it was taken over by the Great Northern Railway. It closed on 15 February 1965.

== Routes ==
Preceding station	Disused railways	Following station
Pomeroy	Portadown, Dungannon and Omagh Junction Railway; Portadown to Omagh	Sixmilecross

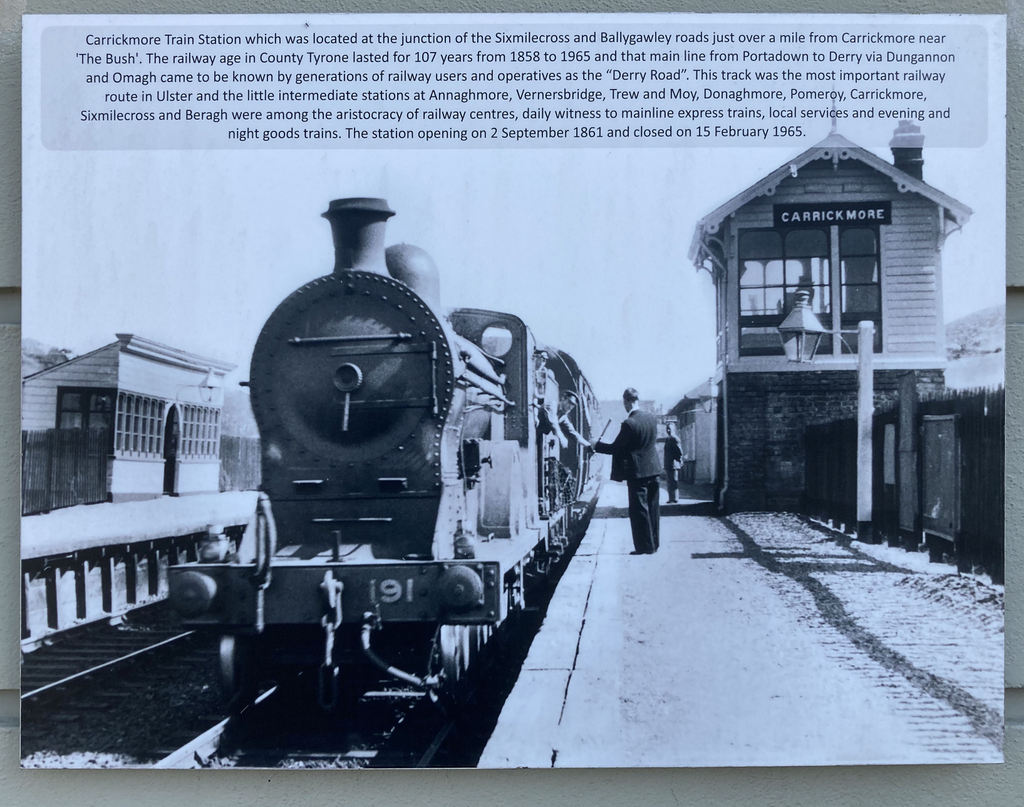
Old view of Carrickmore Railway Station
