= The Troubles in Annaghmore =

Incidents in Annaghmore, Northern Ireland during the Troubles

The Troubles in Annaghmore recounts incidents during, and the effects of, The Troubles in Annaghmore, County Armagh, Northern Ireland.

Incidents in Annaghmore during the Troubles resulting in two or more fatalities:

== 1976 ==
- 13 October 1976 - The Provisional Irish Republican Army (IRA) shot dead Ulster Volunteer Force (UVF) member William Corrigan (41) outside his home in Annaghmore, County Armagh. IRA volunteers opened fire on his car as he arrived home. Although the Sutton Database lists him as a civilian, Lost Lives lists him as a UVF member. It also notes that he had received a two-year suspended sentence for handling ammunition, which he was said to have bought from an Ulster Defence Regiment (UDR) soldier. His son Leslie Corrigan (19) was wounded in the attack and died on 25 October 1976. The attack was dramatised, with names changed, in a 1987 episode of the BBC true crime documentary series Indelible Evidence.
