= Follow the Dead =

- Directed by: Adam William Cahill
- Written by: Adam William Cahill
- Produced by: Adam William Cahill
- Starring: Luke Corcoran; Tadhg Devery; Marybeth Herron; Luke Collins; Cristina Ryan; Aidan O'Sullivan; Ian Lawless; Conor Hackett; Jannine Benkhardt
- Cinematography: Stephen C. Walsh
- Edited by: Adam William Cahill
- Music by: Steven Mckenna; Agung Bagus
- Production company: Wild Stag Productions
- Distributed by: Indie Rights
- Release dates: 17 October 2020 (Kerry International Film Festival); 19 January 2023 (internet)
- Running time: 95 minutes
- Country: Ireland
- Language: English

Follow the Dead is a 2020 Irish zombie film directed by Adam William Cahill, starring Luke Corcoran, Tadhg Devery, Marybeth Herron, Luke Collins and Cristina Ryan. The film blends comedy, horror and drama.

== Cast ==
- Luke Corcoran as Robby
- Malika Abdalahi as Chi
- Marybeth Herron as Liv
- Luke Collins as Jay
- Cristina Ryan as Kate
- Aidan O'Sullivan as Garda Horan
- Ian Lawless as Zippy
- Esther Woods as Sonia
- Abdul Alshareef as Abbas
- Malika Abdalahi as Kobe

== Release ==
The film premiered at the Kerry Film Festival, where it won the Best Narrative Feature award.

== Reception ==
Bobby LePire of Film Threat gave the film a score of 8.5/10 and wrote: "Follow the Dead is a funny, dramatic play on familiar zombie stories. The cast is uniformly superb, while Cahill balances the tone nicely. The pacing is tight, and the plot never loses momentum after introducing all the delightful characters."

Gemma Creagh of the Film Ireland called the film an "entertaining romp that’s full of heart and doesn’t overstay its welcome."

Rich Cross of Starburst rated the film 4 stars out of 5 and wrote that while it is "not flawless", it is a "terrifically entertaining debut." Cross praised the "sharp" dialogue, the "witty" cultural observations and the "strong" performances.

Luke Maxwell of the Dublin Inquirer wrote: "There are moments, now and then, here and there in Follow the Dead that show great ability and look to a bright future for those involved – with more feeling next time."
