= Annaghmore =

Annaghmore may refer to:

- Annaghmore, County Antrim, a townland in County Antrim, Northern Ireland
- Annaghmore, County Armagh, a village and townland in County Armagh, Northern Ireland
- Annaghmore, County Londonderry, a townland in County Londonderry, Northern Ireland
