= Dungannon railway station =

Railway station in Dungannon, County Tyrone, Northern Ireland

Dungannon
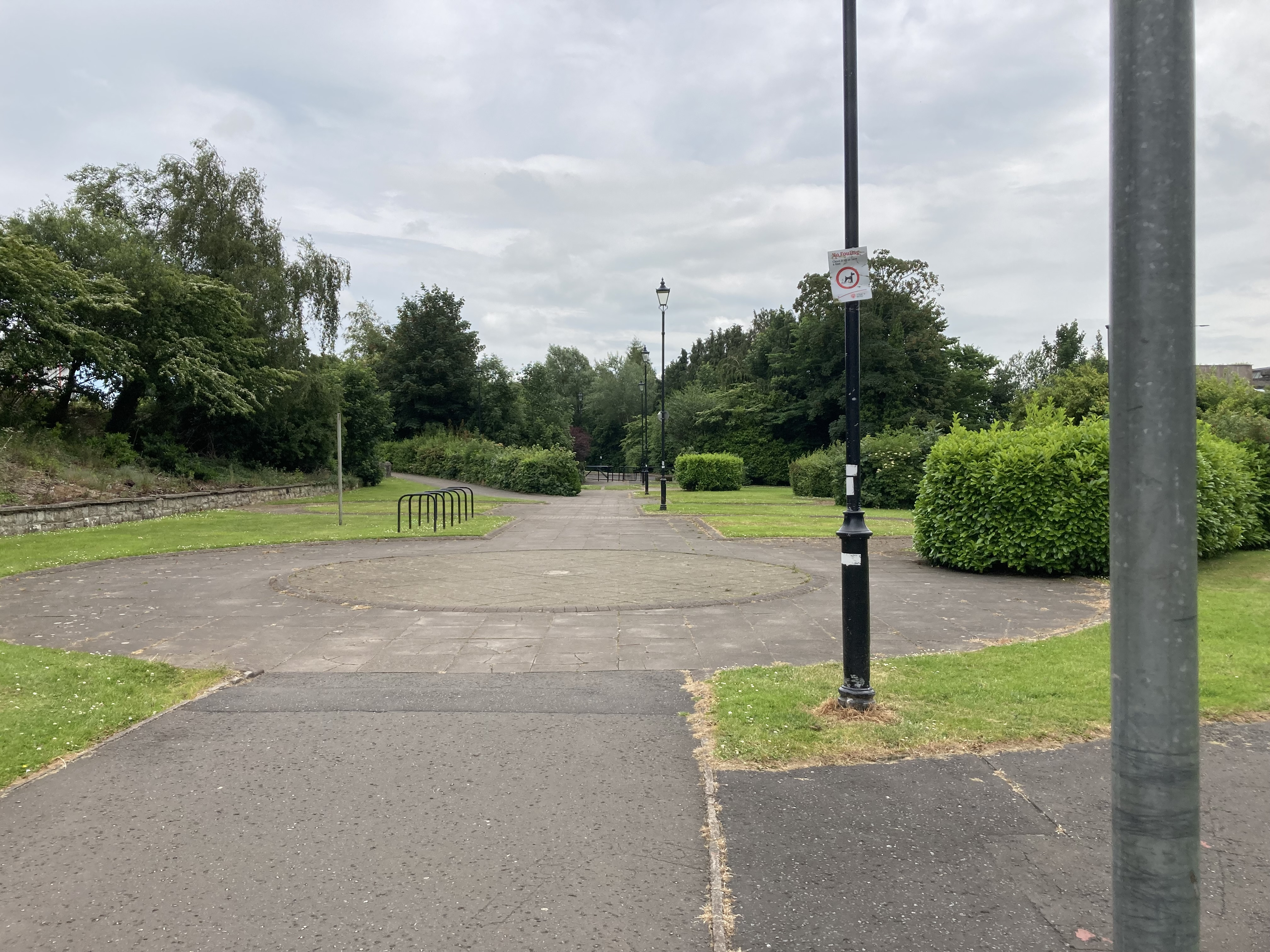
- A modern view of the former Dungannon railway station, now in use as a car park

General information
- Location: Dungannon, County Tyrone; Northern Ireland
- Coordinates: 54.501551°N 6.771284°W

History
- Original company: Portadown, Dungannon and Omagh Junction Railway
- Post-grouping: Great Northern Railway

Key dates
- 5 April 1858: Station opens
- 2 September 1861: Station relocated
- 15 February 1965: Station closes
Location

Dungannon railway station served Dungannon in County Tyrone in Northern Ireland.

== History ==
The Portadown, Dungannon and Omagh Junction Railway opened the station on 5 April 1858. On 2 September 1861, the station was relocated as the line was extended to Omagh railway station completing the Portadown – Derry railway route that came to be informally called "The Derry Road".

In 1876 it was taken over by the Great Northern Railway and built a branch line from Dungannon to Cookstown in 1879.

It closed on 15 February 1965 when the Ulster Transport Authority mothballed the Derry Road line.

== Railway Revival ==
There is the future possibility of the line being reopened to Portadown railway station.

There are plans to reopen railway lines in Northern Ireland including the line from Portadown to Dungannon as well as towards Omagh.

Portadown is the nearest station run by Northern Ireland Railways with trains to Bangor and the Enterprise direct to Belfast Lanyon Place in the east and south to Newry, Dundalk Clarke and Dublin Connolly.

There is also the possibility of reopening the railway from Portadown to Armagh railway station.

== Routes ==
Preceding station	Disused railways	Following station
Trew and Moy	Portadown, Dungannon and Omagh Junction Railway; Portadown to Omagh	Donaghmore
Terminus	Great Northern Railway; Dungannon to Cookstown	Coalisland
	Proposed Services	
Portadown	All-Island Strategic Rail Review; Derry-Portadown Line	Omagh
