= Pomeroy railway station =

Railway station in County Tyrone, Northern Ireland

Pomeroy

General information
- Location: Pomeroy, County Tyrone, Northern Ireland; UK
- Coordinates: 54.58941°N 6.92203°W

History
- Original company: Portadown, Dungannon and Omagh Junction Railway
- Post-grouping: Great Northern Railway

Key dates
- 2 September 1861: Station opens
- 15 February 1965: Station closes
Location

Pomeroy railway station served Pomeroy in County Tyrone in Northern Ireland.

The Portadown, Dungannon and Omagh Junction Railway opened the station on 2 September 1861. In 1876 it was taken over by the Great Northern Railway.

Throughout its history it had the highest altitude of any Irish gauge railway station in Ireland. West of Pomeroy the railway reached its summit, 561 feet (171 metres) above sea level, the highest point on Ireland's Irish gauge network.

It closed on 15 February 1965.

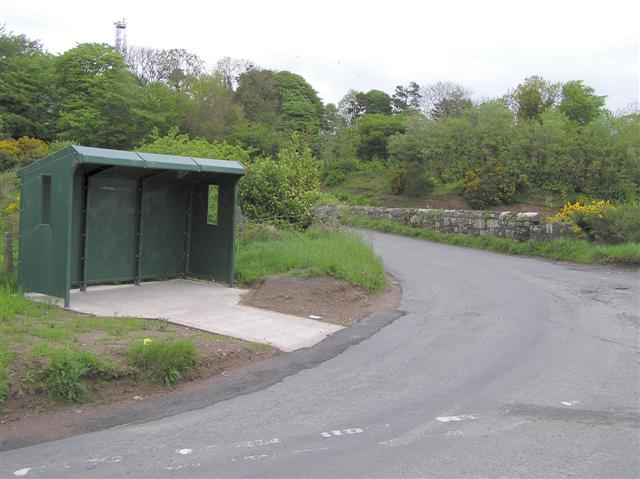
A Bus shelter at Cavankeeran, Pomeroy for Ulsterbus with a retaining wall from the former GNR

== Routes ==
Preceding station	Disused railways	Following station
Donaghmore	Portadown, Dungannon and Omagh Junction Railway; Portadown to Omagh	Carrickmore
