= Annaghmore railway station =

Railway station in Northern Ireland

Annaghmore
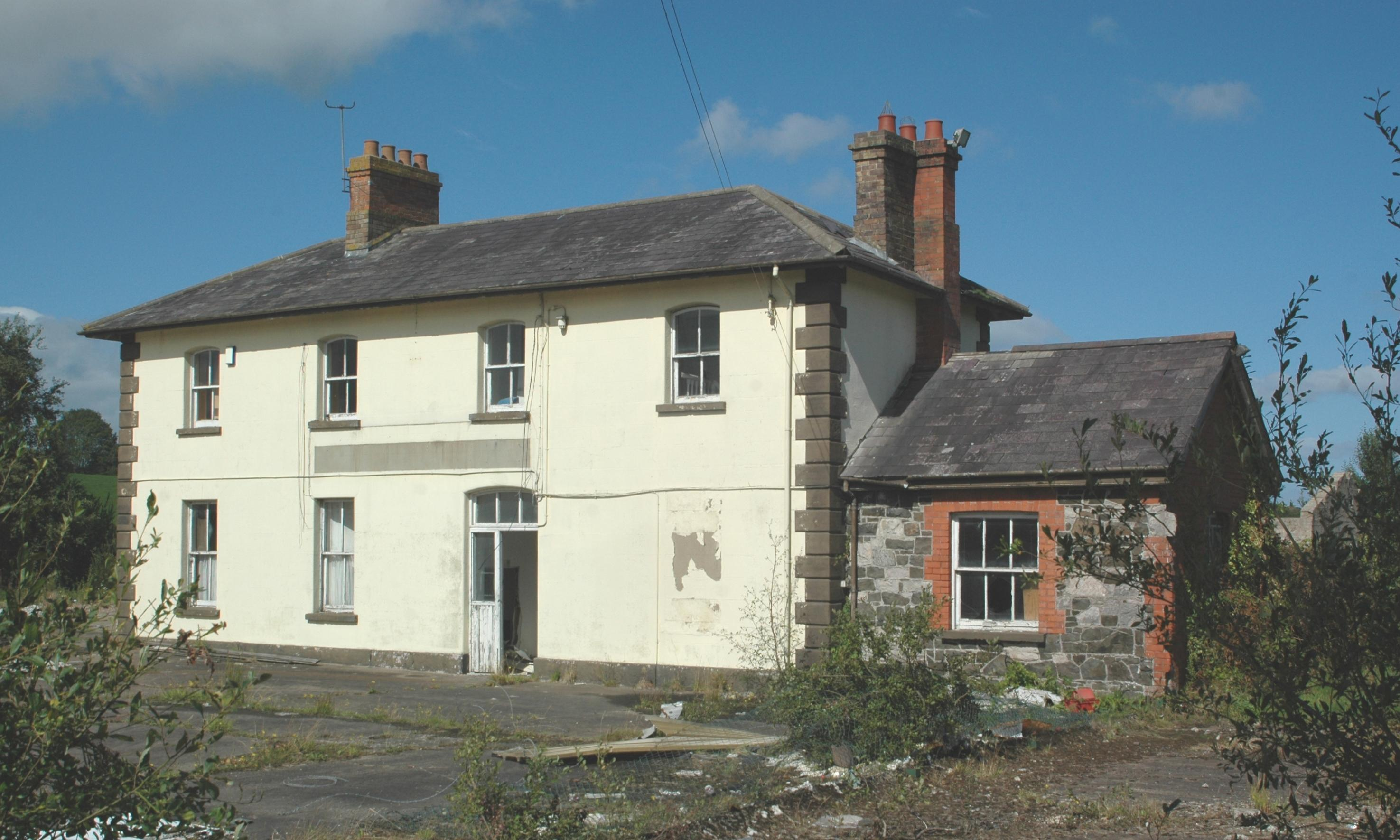
- Main building of former station in 2010

General information
- Location: Annaghmore, County Armagh; Northern Ireland
- Coordinates: 54.4609°N 6.5848°W
- Elevation: 70 ft (21 m)
- Platforms: 2

History
- Original company: Portadown, Dungannon and Omagh Junction Railway
- Post-grouping: Great Northern Railway

Key dates
- 5 April 1858: Station opened
- 1899–1902: Track doubled
- 1959: Track singled
- 15 February 1965: Station closed

Services
| Preceding station | Disused railways | Following station |
|---|---|---|
| Portadown | Portadown, Dungannon and Omagh Junction Railway; Portadown to Omagh | Vernersbridge |
| Annakeera Crossing | Ulster Transport Authority; Portadown — Omagh line | Derrycoose Crossing |
Location

Annaghmore railway station served Annaghmore in County Armagh, Northern Ireland.

== History ==
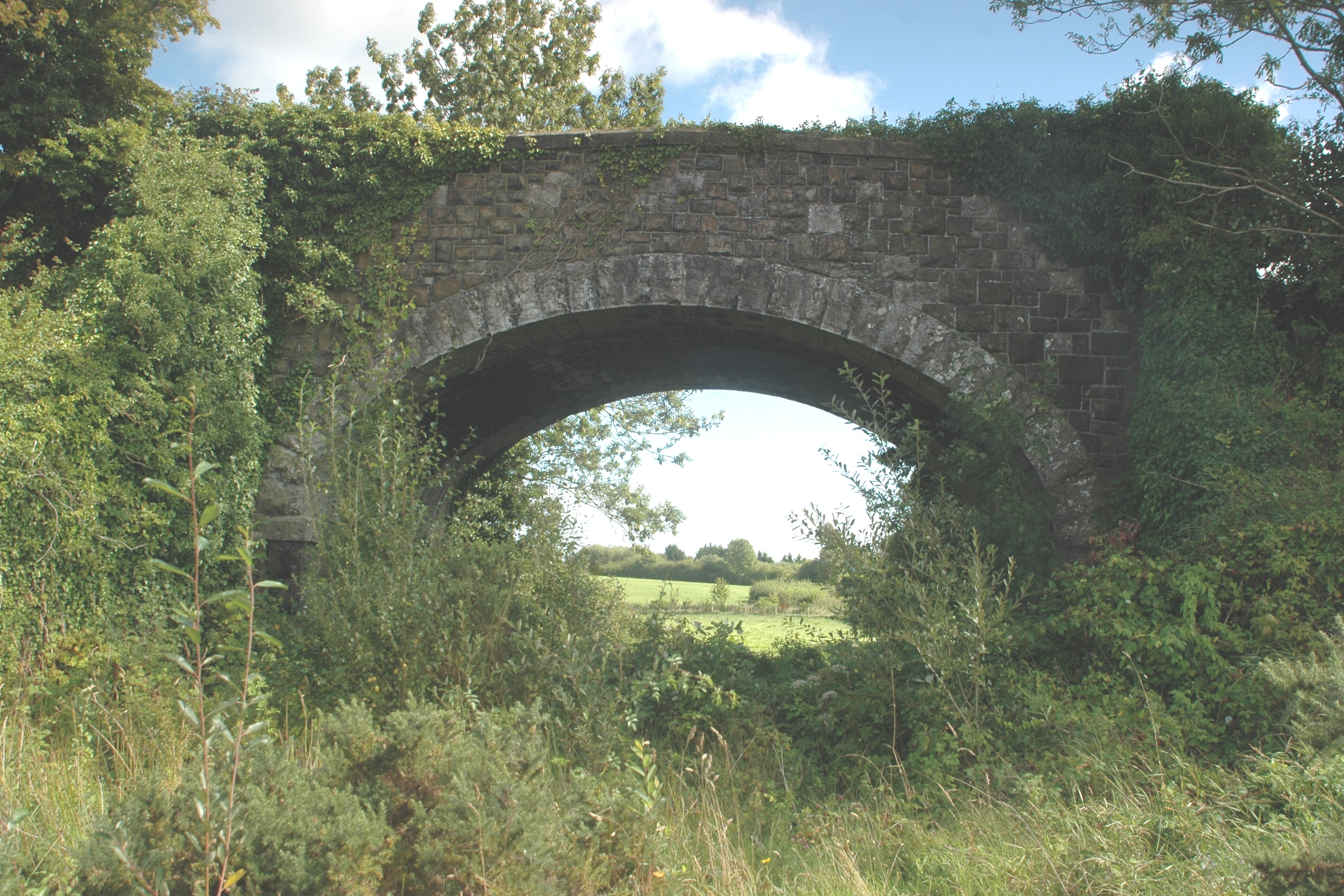
Road bridge over the former PD&O Junction Railway at the up end of the station, looking in the direction of Portadown

The station was opened in 1858 by the Portadown, Dungannon and Omagh Junction Railway, which the Great Northern Railway (GNR) took over in 1876. Annaghmore was served by GNR passenger trains between Belfast Great Victoria Street and Londonderry Foyle Road via Portadown. The GNR built a fruit store at the station for the considerable traffic of locally-grown produce, mainly apples and strawberries, that it shipped out of the area by special trains. The Ulster Transport Authority took over the GNR's remaining lines in Northern Ireland in 1958 and closed the PD&O on 15 February 1965.

After the line was closed the former station was sold. For a time it was a car dealership and repair garage and lay derelict for many years until the station was demolished and the site cleared for housing in 2020.
