= Donaghmore railway station =

Railway station in County Tyrone, Northern Ireland

Donaghmore

General information
- Location: Donaghmore, County Tyrone, Northern Ireland; UK
- Coordinates: 54.526424°N 6.818363°W

History
- Original company: Portadown, Dungannon and Omagh Junction Railway
- Post-grouping: Great Northern Railway

Key dates
- 2 September 1861: Station opens
- 15 February 1965: Station closes
Location

Donaghmore railway station served Donaghmore in County Tyrone in Northern Ireland.

The Portadown, Dungannon and Omagh Junction Railway opened the station on 2 September 1861. In 1876 it was taken over by the Great Northern Railway.

It closed on 15 February 1965.

== Routes ==
Preceding station	Disused railways	Following station
Dungannon	Portadown, Dungannon and Omagh Junction Railway; Portadown to Omagh	Pomeroy
