= Blackstaff Press =

Publisher in Northern Ireland, established 1971

- Parent company: Colourpoint Creative Limited
- Status: active
- Founded: 1971
- Country of origin: Northern Ireland
- Headquarters location: Newtownards
- Distribution: Gill (Ireland); Dufur Editions (USA)
- Publication types: Books and ebooks
- Nonfiction topics: Books of Irish interest
- Official website: blackstaffpress.com

The Blackstaff Press is a publishing company in Newtownards, County Down, Northern Ireland. Founded in 1971, it publishes printed books on a range of subjects (mainly, but not exclusively, of Irish interest) and, since 2011, has also published e-books. It receives financial support from the Arts Council of Northern Ireland.

The Blackstaff Press was acquired by the Baird Group in 1995; it was sold to Colourpoint Creative Limited in 2017.
