= Annaghmore, County Armagh =

Village in County Armagh, Northern Ireland

Coordinates: 54°27′N 6°36′W

Annaghmore: Irish: Eanach Mór
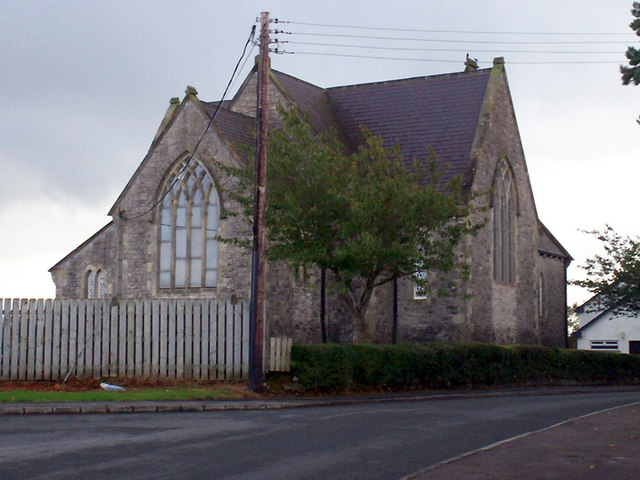
- Annaghmore parish church

- Location within Northern Ireland
- Population: 265
  - Belfast: 28 mi (45 km)
- District: Armagh, Banbridge and Craigavon
- County: County Armagh
- Country: Northern Ireland
- Sovereign state: United Kingdom
- Post town: CRAIGAVON
- Postcode district: BT62
- Dialling code: 028
- UK Parliament: Newry and Armagh
- NI Assembly: Newry and Armagh

Annaghmore (/ænəˈmɔːr/ ann-ə-MOR; from Irish Eanach Mór, meaning 'great marsh') is a small village and townland (of 786 acres) near Loughgall in County Armagh, Northern Ireland. It is situated in the civil parish of Loughgall and the historic barony of Oneilland West. It had a population of 265 people (93 households) in the 2011 Census. (2001 Census: 255 people)

== Education ==
Primary schools in the area include:

- Annaghmore Primary School
- St. Patrick's Primary School, Annaghmore
- Orchard County Primary School (formed in 2005 after the merging of two local primary schools Annaghmore Primary School and Tullyroan Primary School)

== Former railway ==
Annaghmore railway station was opened by the Portadown, Dungannon and Omagh Junction Railway on 5 April 1858. It was closed by the Ulster Transport Authority on 15 February 1965.

== Sports ==
Annaghmore has a GAA club, Annaghmore Pearses GFC (Cumann Phiarsaigh Eanach Mór), founded in 1915. The club currently plays in the county Junior football championship.

== See also ==
- List of towns and villages in Northern Ireland
- List of townlands in County Armagh
