= Dublin InQuirer =

Irish newspaper

The Dublin InQuirer is a local newspaper in Dublin, Ireland. It covers the Dublin City Council and Fingal County Council areas, and topics including housing, homelessness, transport, immigrant life, environment, arts, and food. It launched in 2015, online-only at first. In 2016, it launched a monthly print edition. It is based on Thomas Street, in Dublin 8. It's a small organisation: its website lists an editor, a distribution manager, a deputy editor/reporter, and five other reporters.

It was founded by Lois Kapila and Sam Tranum. Lois Kapila is the majority owner. Dublin Inquirer co-founder Lois Kapila and reporter Laoise Neylon were part of the team that won the European Press Prize Innovation Award in 2022 for the "Cities for Rent" project. Dublin Inquirer reporter Shamim Malekmian won an award for human rights and social justice reporting at the Law Society of Ireland's 2023 Justice Media Awards. Dublin Inquirer is a member of the Press Council of Ireland, as well as the European journalism network the Reference Circle.
