= Colourpoint Books =

Book publisher based in Northern Ireland

Colourpoint Creative
- Parent company: Colourpoint Creative Ltd
- Founded: 1993
- Country of origin: United Kingdom
- Headquarters location: Newtownards, Northern Ireland
- Publication types: Books
- Imprints: Colourpoint Books Blackstaff Press Colourpoint Educational April Sky Design
- Official website: www.colourpoint.co.uk

Colourpoint Creative are an independent publisher based in Newtownards, Northern Ireland. They specialise in local history (Colourpoint Books) and educational textbooks (Colourpoint Educational).

Colourpoint are the primary supplier of educational textbooks for new CCEA A-level, GCSE and Key Stage 3 specifications in Northern Ireland and are the largest publisher of educational textbooks in Northern Ireland.
