= Portadown, Dungannon and Omagh Junction Railway =

Railway in Ireland

- Industry: railway
- Founded: 1855
- Defunct: 1876
- Fate: taken over
- Successor: Great Northern Railway
- Headquarters: Portadown, Ireland
- Area served: County Armagh, County Tyrone

The Portadown, Dungannon and Omagh Junction Railway (PD&O) was an Irish gauge (5 ft 3 in (1,600 mm)) railway in County Armagh and County Tyrone, Ulster, Ireland (now Northern Ireland).

== Early development ==
Portadown and Dungannon Railway Act 1847
- Act of Parliament
- Parliament of the United Kingdom
- Long title: An Act for making a Railway from Portadown in the County of Armagh to Dungannon in the County of Tyrone, to be called "The Portadown and Dungannon Railway."
- Citation: 10 & 11 Vict. c. cliii

Dates
- Royal assent: 9 July 1847

Text of statute as originally enacted

Portadown, Dungannon and Omagh Junction Railway Act 1861
- Act of Parliament
- Parliament of the United Kingdom
- Long title: An Act to enable the Portadown, Dungannon, and Omagh Junction Railway Company to make a Branch Railway to Aughnacloy in the County of Tyrone; to amend the Acts relating to the Railway; and for other Purposes.
- Citation: 24 & 25 Vict. c. lxix

Dates
- Royal assent: 12 June 1861

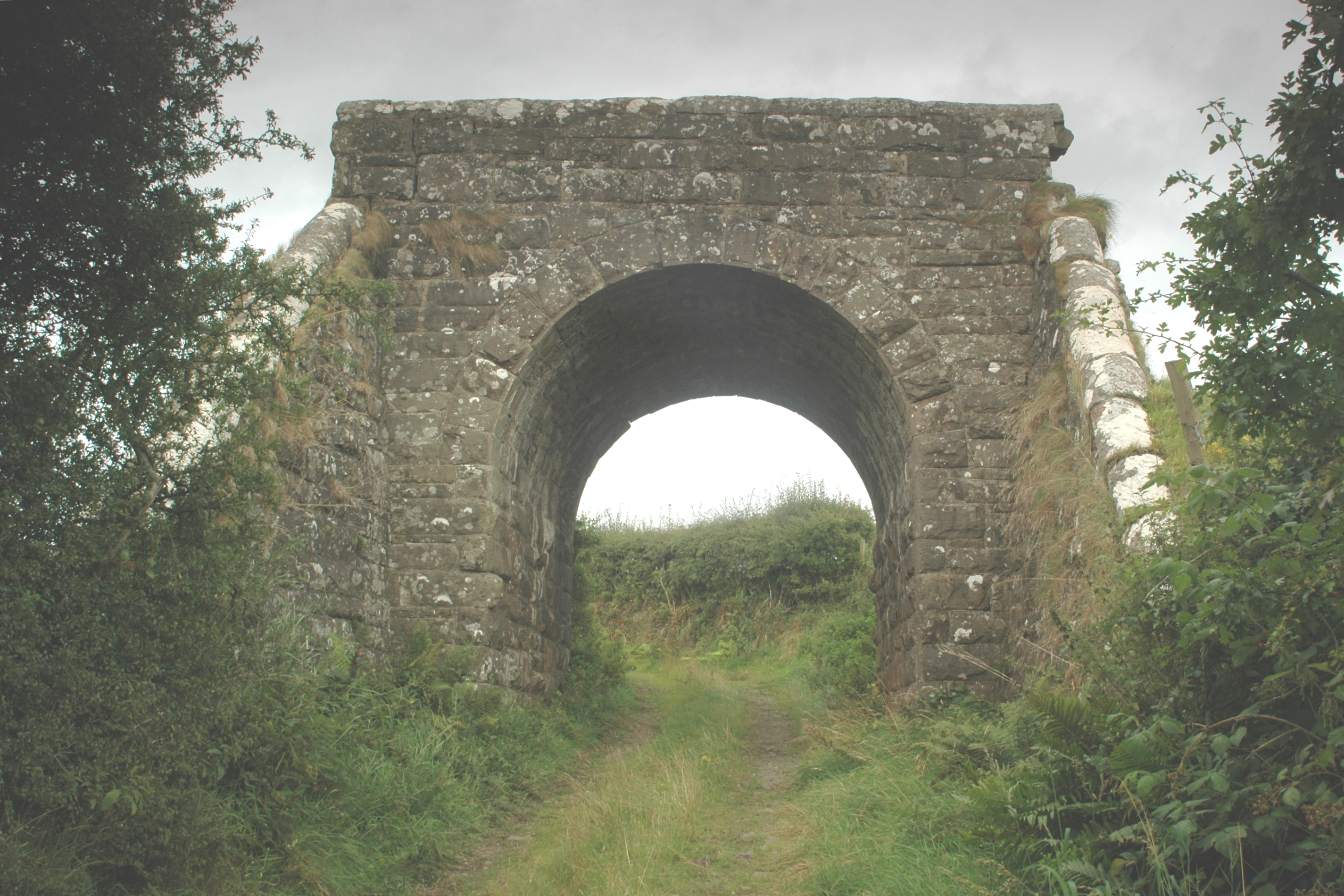
Bridge of former PD&O line over a farm track, somewhere between Dungannon and Pomeroy, County Tyrone. The disused embankment has been partly removed.

Following authorisation by the Portadown and Dungannon Railway Act 1847 (10 & 11 Vict. c. cliii), building of the PD&O line started from Portadown in 1855 and reached Dungannon in 1858. This first section of line opened with temporary termini at both Portadown and Dungannon. At Dungannon the delay was in order to build a half-mile tunnel because Viscount Northland objected to smoky locomotives traversing his land. In due course the PD&O succeeded in gaining access to the Ulster Railway's Portadown station and in 1861 opened for traffic not only Dungannon Tunnel but also the remainder of the route to Omagh, where it formed a junction with the Londonderry and Enniskillen Railway. In so doing it completed the railway route between Portadown and Derry that came to be informally known as the "Derry Road".

Besides Dungannon Tunnel, the PD&O's most significant engineering features were an iron lattice viaduct over the River Blackwater and the fact that west of Pomeroy the line reached a summit of 561 feet (171 metres), the highest elevation of any Irish gauge railway in Ireland.

The contractor to build the PD&O was William Dargan, who in 1860 sold a 999-year lease of the line to the Ulster Railway. In 1876 the Ulster merged with the Irish North Western Railway and the Northern Railway of Ireland to form the Great Northern Railway (GNR).

== Heyday and decline ==
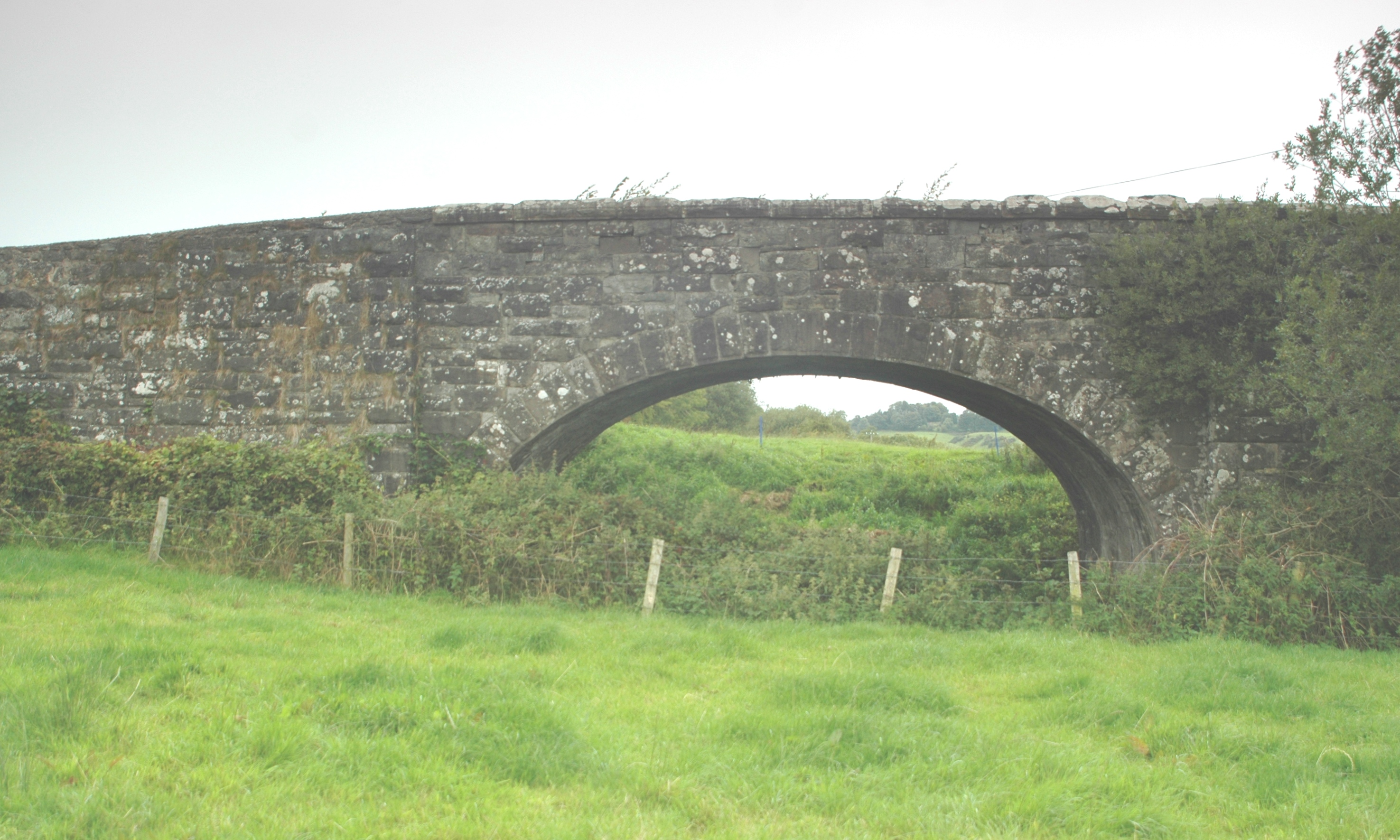
Road bridge over filled-in cutting of PD&O line, somewhere between Dungannon and Pomeroy, County Tyrone.

The GNR opened a branch line from Dungannon to Cookstown in 1879. This turned out to be the only branch line that had a junction with the PD&O route.

The PD&O gave the GNR a direct route between Belfast Great Victoria Street and Londonderry Foyle Road, competing with the Belfast and Northern Counties Railway's northerly route between Belfast York Road and Londonderry Waterside via Coleraine. The B&NCR line was shorter, had better gradients and was faster, and so attracted the majority of passenger traffic between the two cities. However, the GNR route attracted more goods traffic between the two cities plus passenger and goods traffic from the market towns along the route.

Dargan had the PD&O line built as single track, but traffic became sufficient for the GNR to install double track between Portadown and Annaghmore in 1899–1902 and between Dungannon and Donaghmore in 1905–06. After the First World War, increasing road competition reversed this position and the GNR reverted the Dungannon — Donaghmore section to single track after 1932.

In order to reduce operating costs the GNR pioneered the development and use of railbuses, and on lines including the PD&O it opened numerous wayside halts for them to serve. It also pioneered the development and use of railcars, and in the 1950s it introduced a fleet of BUT units whose work included "Derry Road" trains over the PD&O.

The GNR Board cut the Cookstown branch back to Coalisland in 1956. In 1957 the Government of Northern Ireland made the GNRB close almost all of its lines near the border including the Omagh — Enniskillen section of the L&ER, but the "Derry Road" was kept open. The PD&O gained a little traffic from these closures, as trains carrying pilgrims from Dublin Amiens Street to St Patrick's Purgatory on Lough Derg could no longer use the Irish North Western Railway route via Dundalk to Pettigo but had to take the longer route via Portadown to Omagh. But the PD&O lost more trade than it gained, as traffic such as cattle exports from the west of the Republic switched to exporting through the Port of Dublin instead of using the GNR to reach north-eastern ports such as Belfast.

== Final years and closure ==
In May 1958 the Northern Ireland Government initiated the GNR Board's dissolution and partition between the two states, and its remaining lines in Northern Ireland passed to the Ulster Transport Authority. In 1959 the UTA closed the Dungannon — Coalisland section of the Cookstown branch and reduced the PD&O between Portadown and Trew and Moy to single track. In accordance with The Benson Report submitted to the Northern Ireland Government in 1963, the UTA closed the "Derry Road" including the PD&O on 15 February 1965.

== Reopening proposals ==
In the 2010s there has been a proposal to reopen the Dungannon – Portadown section of the PD&O. In January 2013 Northern Ireland's Department of Regional Development published a public consultation document proposing that it could be reopened for an estimated £187 million. This was followed in May 2014 by Regional Development minister Danny Kennedy publishing a Railway Investment Prioritisation Strategy for 2015–35 that proposes railway reopenings, including Dungannon – Portadown.

== Sources and further reading ==
- Baker, Michael HC (1972). Irish Railways since 1916. London: Ian Allan. ISBN 0-7110-0282-7.
- Dewick, Tony (2002). Complete Atlas of Railway Station Names. Hersham: Ian Allan Publishing. maps 58, 60. ISBN 0-7110-2798-6.
- FitzGerald, JD (1995). The Derry Road. Colourpoint Transport. Vol. 2. Gortrush: Colourpoint Press. ISBN 1-898392-09-9.
- Flanagan, Colm (2003). Diesel Dawn. Newtownards: Colourpoint Books. ISBN 1-904242-08-1.
- Hajducki, S Maxwell (1974). A Railway Atlas of Ireland. Newton Abbott: David & Charles. maps 7, 8. ISBN 0-7153-5167-2.
- McCutcheon, Alan (1969). Ireland. Railway History in Pictures. Vol. 1. Newton Abbott: David & Charles. p. 34. ISBN 0-7153-4651-2.
- Patterson, EM (1986) [1962]. Great Northern Railway of Ireland. Oakwood Library of Railway History. Lingfield: Oakwood Press. ISBN 0-85361-343-5.
