= Victoria Bridge railway station =

Railway station in Northern Ireland

Victoria Bridge
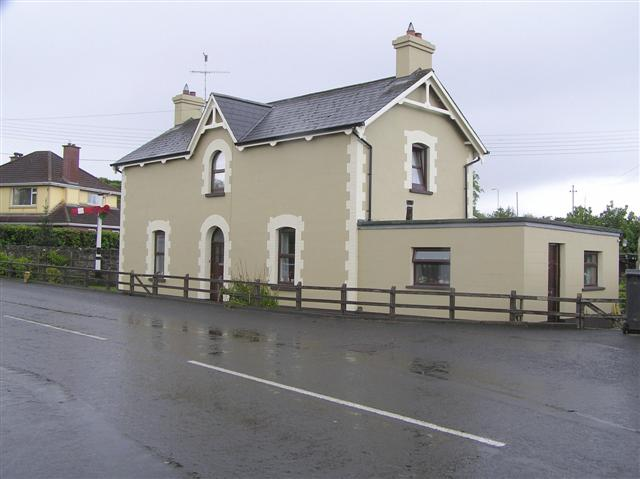
- The station building for Victoria Bridge, which is now a private residence

General information
- Location: Victoria Bridge, County Tyrone, Northern Ireland; UK
- Coordinates: 54.763785°N 7.456911°W
- Elevation: 63 ft (19 m)

Construction
- Structure type: Wooden
- Architect: William H. Mills

History
- Original company: Londonderry and Enniskillen Railway
- Post-grouping: Great Northern Railway (Ireland)

Key dates
- 9 May 1852: Station opens
- 15 February 1965: Station closes
Location

Victoria Bridge in County Tyrone, Northern Ireland was served by two adjacent railway stations.

== History ==
The Londonderry and Enniskillen Railway opened their station on 9 May 1852. It was taken over by the Great Northern Railway (Ireland) in 1883.

Victoria Bridge was the terminus of the Castlederg and Victoria Bridge Tramway, a 7¼ mile long narrow gauge railway linking the GNR(I) main line with the nearby market town of Castlederg. This station opened on 4 July 1884 and closed on 17 April 1933.

Billy Anderson was the last man in charge of Victoria Bridge (GNI) station. Patsy Mc Garrigle served as signalman for the final five years. Victoria Bridge Station was unique because it was constructed from wood and was very beautiful. Now demolished.

The Great Northern Railway (Ireland) station closed on 15 February 1965.

== Routes ==
Preceding station	Disused railways	Following station
Trafalgar (County Tyrone)	Londonderry and Enniskillen Railway; Londonderry to Enniskillen	Newtownstewart
Fyfin	Castlederg and Victoria Bridge Tramway; Castlederg to Victoria Bridge	Terminus
