= Spamount railway station =

Railway station in Northern Ireland

Spamount

General information
- Location: Strabane Rd. / Drumnabey Rd. Spamount, County Tyrone, Northern Ireland; UK
- Coordinates: 54.715346°N 7.554566°W
- Elevation: 178 ft (54 m)

History
- Original company: Castlederg and Victoria Bridge Tramway
- Post-grouping: Castlederg and Victoria Bridge Tramway

Key dates
- 4 July 1884: Station opens
- 17 April 1933: Station closes
Location

Spamount railway station served Spamount in County Tyrone in Northern Ireland.

The Castlederg and Victoria Bridge Tramway opened the station on 4 July 1884. It included a passing loop.

The last services operated on 30 January 1933. The staff went on strike on 31 January 1933, and the line never reopened. It closed formally on 17 April 1933.

== Routes ==
Preceding station	Disused railways	Following station
Castlederg	Castlederg and Victoria Bridge Tramway; Castlederg to Victoria Bridge	Crew
