= Victoria Bridge, County Tyrone =

Village in County Tyrone, Northern Ireland

Coordinates: 54.758889°N 7.459167°W

Victoria Bridge: Irish: Droichead Victoria
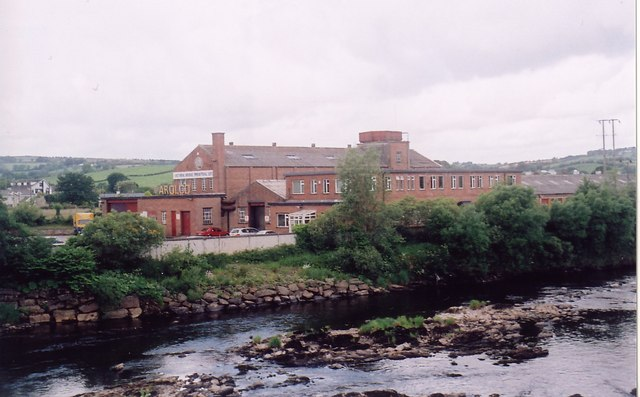
- Victoria Bridge and River Mourne

- Location within Northern Ireland
- Population: 362 (2021 census)
- District: Derry City and Strabane
- County: Tyrone
- Country: Northern Ireland
- Sovereign state: United Kingdom
- Post town: STRABANE
- Postcode district: BT82
- Dialling code: 028
- UK Parliament: Tyrone West

Victoria Bridge is a small village in County Tyrone, Northern Ireland. It is mostly within the townland of Breen (from Irish Bruíghín), which is in the civil parish of Ardstraw. It is also part of the historic barony of Strabane Lower, and Derry City and Strabane District Council. In the 2021 census, it had a population of 362 people.

== Housing ==
Four homes were constructed for people who fought in the Boer War and who returned to the area. These houses were named "Ladysmith".

== Education ==
St Eugene's Primary School was opened in 1960 to replace the old school at Breen. Originally under the jurisdiction of Glenock Parish, Newtownstewart, it changed to become the responsibility of the Parish of St Theresa in Sion Mills. The school has more than 50 pupils.

== Transport ==
The Great Northern Railway (Ireland) served Victoria Bridge railway station. The station opened on 9 May 1852 and the last train from Omagh to Strabane passed through Victoria Bridge on 14 February 1965. Billy Anderson was the last man in charge of Victoria Bridge station. Patsy Mc Garrigle served as signalman at Victoria Bridge for the final five years. Victoria Bridge Station was unique because it was constructed from wood. The closure of the railway remains controversial, especially due to the impact on the local economy.

Victoria Bridge station was also served by the Castlederg and Victoria Bridge Tramway, a narrow gauge railway linking the GNR(I) main line with the nearby market town of Castlederg. This 7¼ mile long line closed in 1933. This station opened on 4 July 1884 and closed on 17 April 1933.

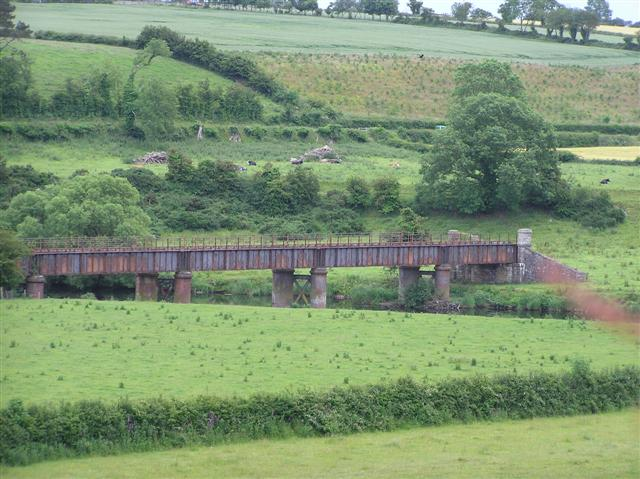
The former GNR mainline bridge over the River Mourne, 1 km north of Victoria Bridge, originally constructed on the Londonderry and Enniskillen Railway.

== See also ==
- List of towns and villages in Northern Ireland
