= Porthall railway station =

Railway station in Ireland

Porthall

General information
- Location: County Donegal; Ireland

History
- Original company: Londonderry and Enniskillen Railway
- Post-grouping: Great Northern Railway (Ireland)

Key dates
- 1 May 1848: Station opens
- 15 February 1965: Station closes
Location

Porthall railway station served Porthall, County Donegal in the Republic of Ireland.

The Londonderry and Enniskillen Railway opened the station on 1 May 1848. It was taken over by the Great Northern Railway (Ireland) in 1883.

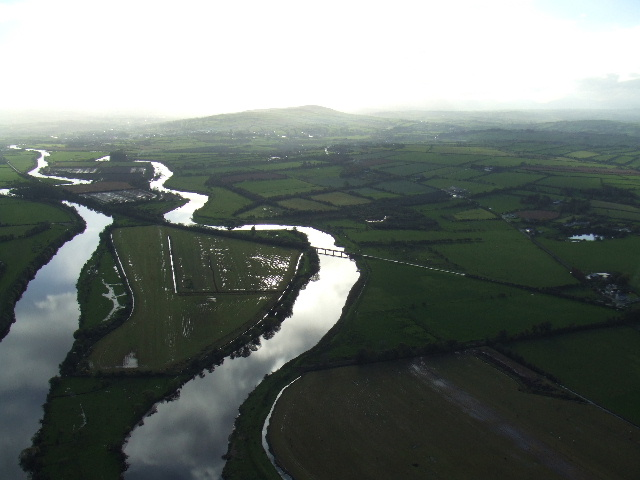
Corkan Island with the GNR line from Strabane (GNI) to Porthall.

It closed on 15 February 1965.

== Routes ==
Preceding station	Disused railways	Following station
Carrickmore	Londonderry and Enniskillen Railway; Londonderry to Enniskillen	Strabane (GNI)
