= Fyfin railway station =

Former railway station in County Tyrone, Northern Ireland

Fyfin

General information
- Location: Fyfin Rd. Fyfin, County Tyrone, Northern Ireland; UK
- Coordinates: 54.737312°N 7.502596°W
- Elevation: 265 ft (81 m)
- Tracks: 1

Construction
- Structure type: Halt

History
- Original company: Castlederg and Victoria Bridge Tramway
- Post-grouping: Castlederg and Victoria Bridge Tramway

Key dates
- 4 July 1884: Station opens
- 17 April 1933: Station closes
Location

Fyfin railway station was a roadside halt which served Fyfin in County Tyrone in Northern Ireland.

The Castlederg and Victoria Bridge Tramway opened the station on 4 July 1884.

The last services operated on 30 January 1933. The staff went on strike on 31 January, and the line never reopened. It closed formally on 17 April 1933.

== Routes ==
Preceding station	Disused railways	Following station
Crew	Castlederg and Victoria Bridge Tramway; Castlederg to Victoria Bridge	Victoria Bridge
