= Tullymuck =

Townland in County Tyrone, Northern Ireland

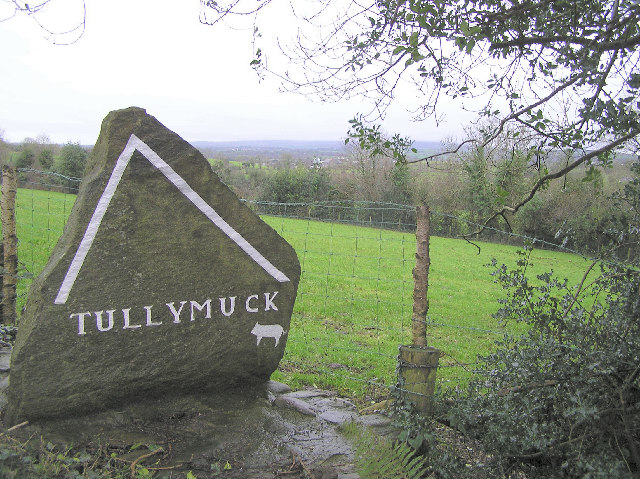
Tullymuck townland in 2006

Tullymuck is a townland in County Tyrone, Northern Ireland. It is situated in the barony of Strabane Lower and the civil parish of Ardstraw and covers an area of 804 acres.

The name derives from the Irish: Tulaigh muc or tullach muc (hill of the pigs). In 1841 the population of the townland was 377 people (70 houses) and in 1851 it was 319 people (61 houses).

In the 17th century, Tullymuck, and the nearby townlands of Lislap and Legland, and neighbouring Newtownstewart, were owned by Sir William Stewart of Aghentain, who had inherited them from his father-in-law, Sir Robert Newcomen. Stewart was a settler in Ireland, from a Wigtownshire family, owning Aghentain Castle, which he built, and Kilmacrenan Castle. He was involved in the suppression of the Irish Rebellion of 1641.

== See also ==
- List of townlands of County Tyrone
