= St Johnston railway station =

Former transport facility in County Donegal, Ireland

St Johnston
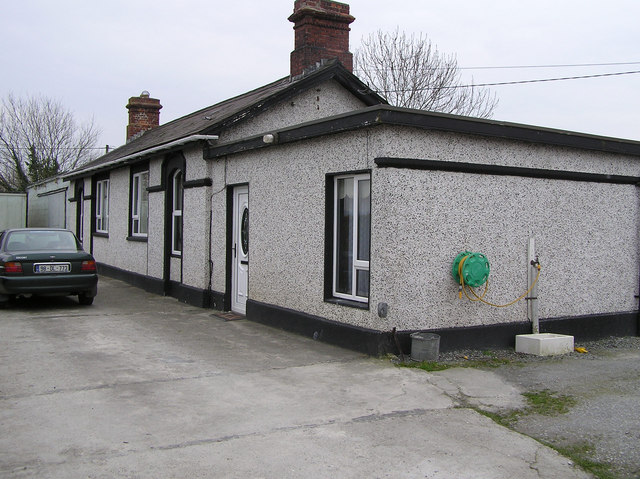
- St Johnston railway station

General information
- Location: Railway Road, St Johnston; County Donegal; Ireland
- Coordinates: 54°56′00″N 07°27′22″W

History
- Original company: Londonderry and Enniskillen Railway
- Post-grouping: Great Northern Railway (Ireland)

Key dates
- 19 April 1847: Station opens
- 15 February 1965: Station closes
Location

St Johnston railway station is a former railway station that served St Johnston, County Donegal in the Republic of Ireland. The Londonderry and Enniskillen Railway opened the station on 19 April 1847. It was taken over by the Great Northern Railway in 1883. It closed on 15 February 1965.

== History ==
St Johnston station was opened as a part of the Londonderry and Enniskillen Railway in 1847. The opening of the station brought prosperity to the village of St Johnston. After the partition of Ireland in 1921 the Irish Revenue Commissioners selected St Johnston as the location for the customs post for the link between County Donegal and County Londonderry in Northern Ireland, despite the customs officers being considered ineffective for the route, as smugglers tended not to use the railway when heading for Londonderry station. It was operated by Great Northern Railway and was known locally as the "Derry Road", for people passing through to connect at Londonderry station to change trains to connect onwards to Belfast.

In 1959, the majority of railways and railway stations in County Donegal were closed down in December. However St Johnston remained open until 1965 when the Ulster Transport Authority closed the Derry Road line, serving between Londonderry and Strabane stations, down. The closure of St Johnston hit the village economically as they had relied on the income from customs officers based there, as the customs house closed along with the railway. The closure was also debated in the Senate of Northern Ireland, where Northern Irish senators objected to the closure citing economic viability, and one member stated that he had previously used St Johnston to deliver six combine harvesters to County Donegal.

== Routes ==
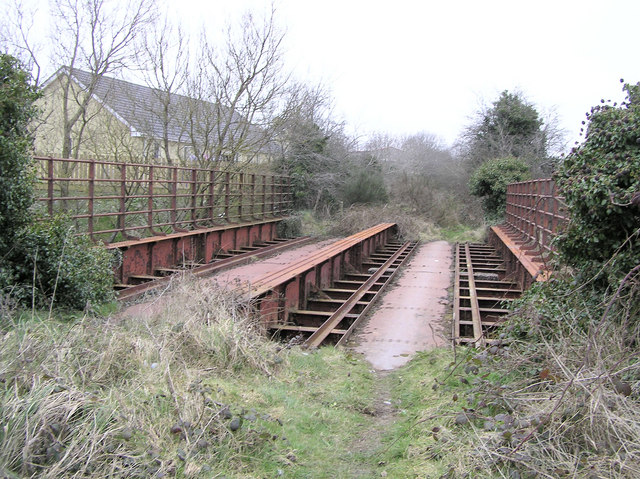
The closed alignment double track railway.

Preceding station	Disused railways	Following station
Carrigans	Londonderry and Enniskillen Railway; Londonderry to Enniskillen	Carrickmore
