= Trevor Hamilton =

Northern Irish murderer

- Born: 19 June 1982 (age 44); Sion Mills
- Other name: "The Bandit"
- Status: Convicted
- Motive: Misogyny
- Convictions: Indecent exposure; Rape; Attempted Buggery; Indecent Assault; Making a Threat to Kill; Murder
- Penalty: Life imprisonment with a minimum of 35 years

Details
- Victims: 1 confirmed
- Span of crimes: 1994–2004
- Country: Northern Ireland
- State: County Tyrone

Trevor William Hamilton (born 19 June 1982) is a Northern Irish murderer from Sion Mills, County Tyrone. He was sentenced to life imprisonment for the abduction and murder of 65-year-old Attracta Harron on 11 December 2003. On appeal his whole-life term, the first in Northern Ireland legal history, was reduced to 35 years.

== Background ==
Described by locals as a "depraved loner", who had an estimated IQ of 68, Hamilton first came to the attention of authorities as a teenager for exposing his penis to and masturbating in front of women driving on country roads near his home, and was eventually sentenced to two years' probation in December 1999 after being convicted of five counts of indecent exposure. Despite not having a full driving licence, Hamilton would often cruse the roads around Sion Mills, and would later claim that his neighbors nicknamed him "The Bandit" due to his ability to evade police.

== 2001 Rape Conviction ==
On the afternoon of 16 February 2000, a then 17-year-old Hamilton parked his car at a bus stop in Sion Mills and offered 29-year-old Helen Harpur a lift into Newtownstewart. On the way there Hamilton turned off the main road and drove to his family home on Concess Road, saying he needed to pick something up. However, on arrival he suddenly started to strangle Harpur, before dragging her into a caravan parked in the house's yard by her hair. Hamilton then raped Harpur for over an hour, all the while beating her and threatening to kill her, before making her swear on her son's life she wouldn't alert the authorities if he let her go. Hamilton eventually drove Harpur to her mother's house, where the police were then immediately called. Harpur thereafter directed investigating officers to Hamilton's house, where they discovered him removing the number plates from his car and noticed he had shaved off his hair in an apparent attempt to alter his appearance. A search of the house also revealed that Hamilton had washed the clothes he was wearing earlier in the day.

Hamilton initially denied any involvement in the attack until his trial began on 26 March 2001, after which he changed his plea to guilty. While pre-sentence reports deemed him to be a person of low intelligence, they also asserted he had the mental capacity to know right from wrong, noting that the attack was planned in advance rather than a crime of opportunity. The reports additionally stated that Hamilton major difficulties in controlling his sexual urges. The court heard that during the attack, Hamilton had also attempted to anally rape Harpur, and only ended his assault after he had ejaculated over her abdominal area. Although originally sentenced to 4 years imprisonment in a young offenders institute followed by 3 years' probation, the Attorney General appealed the leniency of his sentence, and eventually the court of appeal re-sentenced him to 7 years imprisonment.

In mid-2003 Hamilton was released from prison on licence after serving half of a seven-year sentence for the attack on Harpur. The risk he posed to the public, especially adult women, was assessed as high (level 3).

== Murder of Attracta Harron ==
On 11 December 2003, Attracta Harron, who was a 65-year-old recently retired librarian, attended morning Mass near Lifford, County Donegal. She then began walking via Strabane the several miles back to her home on the Curleyhill Road, and was last seen alive on CCTV footage crossing the bridge over the river Foyle at around 10:45am. Shortly afterwards, Edward McCauley was driving his tractor along Orchard Road near Sion Mills when he saw a red coloured car being driven by a man approaching him at speed. As the car got closer, he could see the female passenger of the car waving her arms at him as if trying to draw his attention, and he noticed that she also had what looked like blood streaked across her face.

At 12:57pm, the Fire Brigade was alerted to a car on fire at number 3 Concess Road, which was Hamilton's family home. On arrival the fire crew discovered a red Hyundai Lantra ablaze, with the source of the fire being determined to have been in front passenger compartment. Trevor Hamilton was present at the scene, and claimed to have not left the house all morning and told police that an intruder probably set fire to his car maliciously. Hamilton, who was at that time working as a farm labourer, was supposed to have been at work that morning sorting potatoes but his employer's machinery had broken down.

At around 6pm, Attracta Harron's family reported her missing to the Police Service of Northern Ireland after she had failed to return home. At a missing persons briefing the next morning, detectives linked the unexplained fire at Hamilton's house to Harron's sudden disappearance, and in late-February 2004 they seized the burnt out car for forensic examination. A cadaver dog indicated the presence of blood in the car, after which DNA samples matching Attracta Harron were recovered from the car mats. PSNI search teams thereafter examined Hamilton's house and discovered the site of a bonfire in the garden, from which the burnt remains of rosary beads, blue plasters, a religious text and an AIB bank receipt were recovered.

On 28 March 2004 at Omagh Magistrates' Court, 21-year-old Trevor William Hamilton was formally charged with the murder of Attracta Harron on 11 December 2003, which was the day she was last seen alive. Detective Inspector John Gilmore told the court that Hamilton made no reply when charged with her murder, and that although no body had yet been found there was strong forensic evidence that she had been murdered and that Hamilton was the person responsible. Hamilton was then remanded in custody to appear before Strabane Magistrates' Court on 22 April 2004 for a further hearing.

Attracta Harron's decomposed remains were discovered by cadaver dogs on the evening of 5 April 2004, four months after she was last seen alive, hidden in a river bank less than 100 yards behind Hamilton's home at Concess Road.

== Trial ==
On 2 March 2006, Hamilton's murder trial began in Dungannon Crown Court before Justice McLaughlin. Prosecutor Terence Mooney QC outlined to the jury of six men and six women heard how Attracta Harron's naked dead body was discovered wrapped in animal feed bags in a shallow grave a short distance from the accused's home. The grave was covered with stone slabs, that were later determined to have come from the yard of Hamilton's house, as were the feed bags also. Mrs Harron had died from blunt force trauma to the head and face, possibly inflicted with a hatchet, and her decomposed remains were estimated to have been at the site for approximately five months. Mooney QC asserted that compelling circumstantial evidence, along with forensic evidence, would prove beyond reasonable doubt that Hamilton was responsible for the murder of Attracta Harron.

Doctor Ruth Griffin informed the court how a team of sniffer dogs had located Harron's remains on a river bank behind Hamilton's house, along with various items of women's clothing. A white woven plastic sack was visible partially buried with stones slabs around it, and bodily fluids were observed to be leaking from the shallow grave. When the sack was cut open a pair of human feet were found, after which the remains were placed in a body bag. A bone marrow sample extracted from the body later matched a DNA sample taken from Harron's toothbrush.

Forensic expert Stephen Maxwell explained to the court how charred ATM receipts, along with burnt bank documents and religious pamphlets, were recovered from the site of a bonfire behind Hamilton's house. Bank officials from Allied Irish Bank and First Trust Bank submitted documents to the court proving that cash had been withdrawn from the bank accounts of Harron and her husband via an ATM in Loughrea in September 2003, and that the charred receipts matched these transactions.

Taking the stand to testify in his own defense, Hamilton vehemently denied murdering Attracta Harron, however he did admit to lying to detectives investigating her death while under interrogation over three days. Hamilton had originally claimed to police he had not driven the Hyundai Lantra that was later found on fire at his house on the day of Harron's disappearance, as he was worried about getting in trouble for driving without a license or insurance. Hamilton clarified to the court that he had in fact travelled to Clady to buy petrol, as well as a second journey around his home. Hamilton also denied committing the rape he was convicted of in 2001, and asserted he only pled guilty after his legal representatives persuaded him to do so in the hope of a lighter sentence.

== Verdict and sentencing ==
Hamilton was found guilty of Attracta Harron's murder on 12 April 2006. Trial judge Justice McLaughlin, when sentencing him on 4 August 2006, recommended that he should never be released from prison and thus sentenced him to a whole-life order (the first time this had happened in Northern Ireland, though such sentences have been imposed on as many as 50 inmates in England and Wales). As he was led away by prison officers, Hamilton was observed to be smirking by members of the media.

However, on 27 June 2008 the Court of Appeal instead ruled that he be re-sentenced to life in prison and would have to serve a minimum of 35 years before parole could be considered, meaning that he is now expected to remain in prison until at least 2040, when he would be 58. Hamilton's crimes were the subject of a serious case review in 2006.

== Incarceration at Maghaberry ==
In autumn 2006, Hamilton was attacked and beaten by a fellow prisoner in Erne House in Maghaberry Prison. He has been held in Maghaberry since his conviction. At that time he maintained his innocence of the Harron murder.
