= Castlederg railway station =

Railway station in Northern Ireland

Castlederg
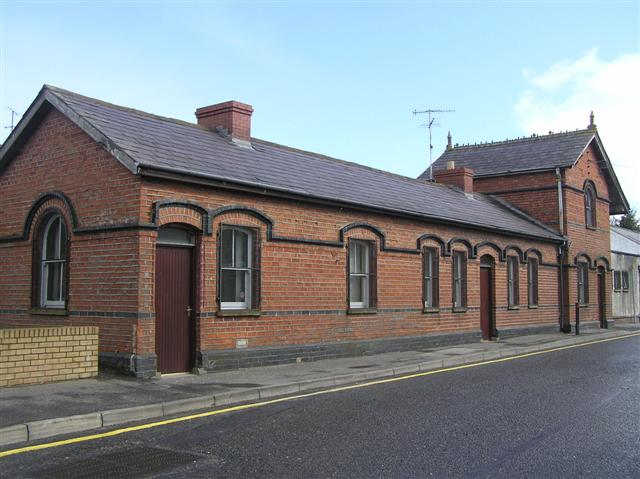
- Photo of Castlederg railway station taken on 20 March 2007

General information
- Location: Upper Strabane Rd. Castlederg, County Tyrone, Northern Ireland; UK
- Coordinates: 54.708811°N 7.590515°W
- Elevation: 173 ft (53 m)
- Platforms: 1
- Tracks: 1

History
- Original company: Castlederg and Victoria Bridge Tramway
- Post-grouping: Castlederg and Victoria Bridge Tramway

Key dates
- 4 July 1884: Station opens
- 17 April 1933: Station closes
Location

Castlederg railway station served Castlederg in County Tyrone in Northern Ireland.

The Castlederg and Victoria Bridge Tramway opened the station on 4 July 1884.

It consisted of a station house (extant), goods store, engine house (location of Lyons Bros garage) and Managers house (extant, 54.708566°N 7.588861°W)

The last services operated on 30 January 1933. The staff went on strike on 31 January, and the line never reopened. It closed formally on 17 April 1933.

== Routes ==
Preceding station	Disused railways	Following station
Terminus	Castlederg and Victoria Bridge Tramway; Castlederg to Victoria Bridge	Spamount
