= River Mourne =

Coordinates: 54.82166°N 7.45817°W

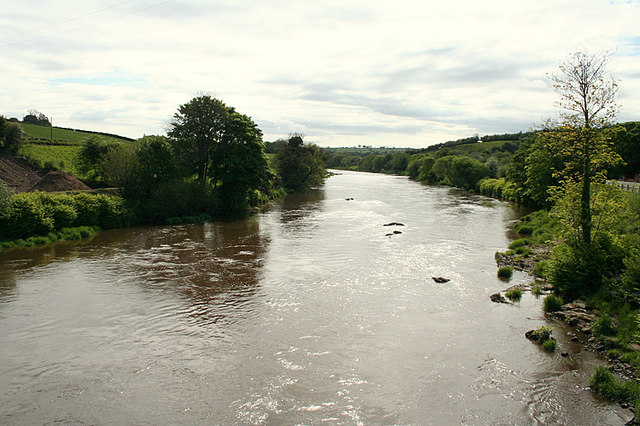
- River Mourne at Victoria Bridge
- Etymology: From Mugdorna, an ancient kingdom
- Native name: An Mughdhorn (Irish)

Location
- Country: Northern Ireland

Physical characteristics
- Source
  - location: Northwest of Newtownstewart
- Mouth
  - location: Lough Foyle
- Length: 13 km (8.1 mi)
- Discharge
  - average: 21.1 m^{3}/s (750 cu ft/s)

Basin features
- River system: River Foyle

The River Mourne (Irish: An Mughdhorn) is a river in County Tyrone (between Strabane and Newtownstewart), Northern Ireland, and is a tributary of the River Foyle It is formed at the meetings of the River Derg and River Strule below Ardstraw. At Strabane it joins with the River Finn to form the River Foyle. Fishing is largely for salmon, grilse and sea trout. Other species such as Common Roach, Common Minnow, Northern Pike, European Eel, Perch and Sticklebacks can also be found in different stretches of the River on occasion.

The traditional folk song "The Moorlough Shore" (also called The Maid of Mourne Shore) refers to names and places along the river.

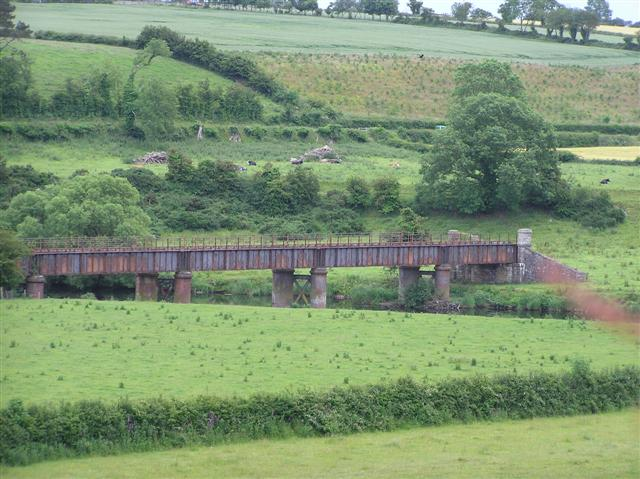
The former GNR mainline bridge over the River Mourne at Victoria Bridge, County Tyrone originally constructed on the Londonderry and Enniskillen Railway.
