= Trafalgar railway station (Northern Ireland) =

Railway station in County Tyrone, Northern Ireland

Trafalgar

General information
- Location: County Tyrone, Northern Ireland; UK
- Coordinates: 54.763123°N 7.455690°W

History
- Original company: Londonderry and Enniskillen Railway
- Post-grouping: Great Northern Railway (Ireland)
Location

Trafalgar railway station was between Sion Mills railway station and Victoria Bridge railway station in County Tyrone in Northern Ireland.

It was a private station. The opening and closing dates are not known.

== Routes ==
Preceding station	Disused railways	Following station
Sion Mills	Londonderry and Enniskillen Railway; Londonderry to Enniskillen	Victoria Bridge
