= Multi-Agency Public Protection Arrangement =

In the jurisdiction of England and Wales, a Multi-Agency Public Protection Arrangement (MAPPA) is an arrangement, set up in 2001, for the "responsible authorities" tasked with the management of registered sex offenders, violent and other types of sexual offenders, and offenders who pose a serious risk of harm to the public. The "responsible authorities" of the MAPPA include the Probation Service, HM Prison Service and England and Wales Police Forces. MAPPA is coordinated and supported nationally by the Public Protection Unit within His Majesty’s Prison and Probation Service (HMPPS). MAPPA was introduced by the Criminal Justice and Court Services Act 2000 and was strengthened under the Criminal Justice Act 2003.

Following the Criminal Justice Act 2003, Lay Advisors have been introduced to sit on Strategic Management Boards (SMBs) who have the strategic oversight of MAPPA. These are members of the public who have been selected to help with the development and monitoring of Multi-Agency Public Protection Arrangements and aim to boost public confidence in the arrangements. There should be two Lay Advisers on each SMB in England and Wales, a total of 84 nationally.

== Assessment of offenders ==
The legislation requires a three-stage process for managing dangerous offenders. First, these three agencies in conjunction with partner agencies, such as social services and health agencies, need to identify three types of offender living in their area:

- Category 1: Registered Sex Offenders (RSOs),
- Category 2: All offenders who have received a custodial sentence of 12 months or more in prison for a sexual or violent offence and whilst they remain under Probation supervision.
- Category 3: Anyone else who poses a "risk of serious harm to the public" who has received a conviction and whose risk would be better managed in a multi-agency setting.

An offender cannot be in more than one MAPPA Category, and if multiple offences are committed, they will default to the lowest number category. For instance, if an offender committed an attempted murder, but also committed a sexual assault, they would be a Category 1 offender rather than a Category 2 for the duration of their Sex Offender Registration. Following the completion of their registration, if they were still under Probation supervision/licence then they would become a Category 2 offender. If the supervision/licence had expired, then it would be up to the local area MAPPA if they qualify for Category 3 status.

The legislation then requires that the agencies conduct a formal risk assessment of each offender and allocate them to a tier of multi-agency management — known as level one, two or three.

- Level One represents the normal inter-agency management of the offender in the community by one agency, with some liaison.
- Level Two means that Multi Agency Public Protection meetings (MAPPs) will be held where the offender's management will be discussed between various parties involved in their case.
- Level Three is essentially the same as Level Two, except that senior management representatives will be in attendance and greater resources are expected to be used in the management of the offender.

Level Three are sometimes called the "critical few". These are offenders posing the highest possible level of risk to the public and normally necessitates a specific case conference to pool unusual agency resources and ensure a strategically coordinated risk management plan. These might be predatory sex offenders, recidivist arsonists, extremely violent offenders, dangerously mentally ill offenders, domestic terrorists or people with dangerous personality disorders. At each MAPP meeting agencies have to share often confidential information, and will in many cases adopt a press strategy.

=== Risk assessment ===
Before a management plan is put in place a detailed risk assessment will take place to identify the circumstances and opportunities that are most likely to lead to a further serious offence in this particular offender and the steps that can help reduce this risk. This will study the offender's previous offending history, life circumstances, include psychological assessments (where relevant) and any work in prison that the offender has completed. The Police and the National Probation Service use a risk assessment tool called Risk Matrix 2000 which assesses the statistical likelihood of re-offending by adult male convicted sex offenders only. The Probation Service use a nationally validated risk assessment tool called OASys which help predict the likelihood and circumstances of future offending behaviour. For young offenders, the Youth Justice Board uses a system called ASSET which is specifically designed to understand the behaviours of offenders under the age of eighteen.

=== Management plan ===
A management plan is thus highly specific to each offender and their offending history, but might include any of the following:

- Accommodation at an Approved Premises (AP) where the offender can be monitored.
- A set of licence conditions such as having contact with children, or going within an exclusion zone in a town/city.
- A Civil Order such as a Sex Offender Prevention Order (SOPO) to prevent the offender doing certain activities, such as not entering a town where a victim resides, not to have unsupervised contact with children.
- A duty to report to an Offender Manager every week to undertake offending reduction counseling and work as part of their licence.
- In some very extreme cases there may be covert monitoring of offenders to protect the public.
- A disclosure of information to a member of the public for their protection.

The MAPPA system cannot guarantee the protection of the public as such, but can only "manage" the risks through the limited powers of each agency as effectively as possible. This means that all steps that can be legitimately taken by the agencies should be taken. MAPPA decision making is frequently fraught with dilemmas. For example, it is not uncommon for a MAPPA meeting to decide to disclose to a member of the public about an offender's risk to protect that individual or somebody else. However each time that a disclosure is made the Panel loses control of the way that information is used. Some sex offenders have been attacked and killed as a result of public animosity, and others "driven underground" where agencies cannot manage them at all.

== Criticism of the MAPPA ==
Points of criticism of the MAPPA include:

- Research has highlighted MAPPA arrangements are not uniformly applied and that standards, practice and procedure varies considerably between local areas.
- Apart from a one-off payment two years ago, there has been no extra funding for police, probation or prisons, or indeed other agencies for dedicated resourcing of MAPPA work.
- The law on information sharing is complex and confusing, and includes a meshing of human rights, data protection, common law and defamation legislation.
- Evaluation mechanisms of MAPPA are in most agencies immature and still in process of development. It is therefore hard to know how much these measures are tangibly adding to public protection.
- The focus has been on level three cases, but level two cases can be extremely dangerous as well, and there has often been little or no evaluation of the management of these cases in reporting mechanisms.
- Recent research indicates that there is inadequate training and professional support for staff working in Public Protection Arrangements across many parts of the country.

== Similar systems in other countries ==
=== Scotland ===
MAPPA in Scotland is based on the systems in place in England and Wales, with a few minor differences. The most noticeable of these is that in England and Wales the "responsible authority" is made up of the Probation Service, the Police Service and HM Prison Services; whereas in Scotland they are made up of the Police Service, Social Work Scotland, Scottish Prison Service and NHS Scotland.

The arrangements are much newer than in England and Wales and while they have the policy in place to take Category 2 offenders, they do not yet do so. It is anticipated that Category 2 offenders will not be under Scottish MAPPA until after 2009.

On 31 March 2009, there were a total of 2967 registered sex offenders (RSOs) resident in Scotland's communities (equating to 57.4 RSOs per 100,000 of the Scottish population), which whilst generally consistent with the previous year’s figures indicates a slight decrease from 31 March 2008, when the recorded figure was 3131.

=== Northern Ireland ===
The Multi-Agency Sex Offender Risk Assessment and Management (MASRAM) Arrangements were used in Northern Ireland. They were originally launched on 1 September 2001, but not to the same statutory footing as MAPPA in England and Wales. Following an inspection by Criminal Justice Inspection NI and a review of the circumstances around the re-offending by Trevor Hamilton and the death of Attracta Harron, it was announced that the MASRAM arrangements would be placed on a statutory footing and based on the MAPPA in England and Wales with the view to extend MASRAM to also cover what MAPPA calls Category 2 and 3.

Following the Criminal Justice (NI) Order 2008, from October 6, 2008, the MASRAM arrangements were placed on a statutory footing under a new name of the Public Protection Arrangements Northern Ireland (PPANI). PPANI is very similar to the England and Wales MAPPA with the only minor differences being that certain names are different. For instance, for what the England and Wales MAPPA calls a Multi-Agency Public Protection (MAPP) meeting, PPANI calls it a Local Area Public Protection Panel (LAPPP). Unlike MAPPA in Scotland, PPANI also has in place two members of the public as Lay Members on their Senior Management Boards.
