= Carrickmore railway station =

Carrickmore railway station can mean:

- Carrickmore railway station (County Donegal), in Carrickmore, County Donegal, Ireland
- Carrickmore railway station (Northern Ireland), in Carrickmore, County Tyrone, Northern Ireland
