= Crew railway station =

Railway station in Northern Ireland

Crew

General information
- Location: Fyfin Rd./Crew Rd. Crew, County Tyrone, Northern Ireland; UK
- Coordinates: 54.725659°N 7.521692°W
- Elevation: 196 ft (60 m)
- Tracks: 1

History
- Original company: Castlederg and Victoria Bridge Tramway
- Post-grouping: Castlederg and Victoria Bridge Tramway

Key dates
- 4 July 1884: Station opens
- 17 April 1933: Station closes
Location

Crew railway station served Crew in County Tyrone in Northern Ireland.

The Castlederg and Victoria Bridge Tramway opened the station on 4 July 1884 and included a passing loop and Goods Shed.

The last services operated on 30 January 1933. The staff went on strike on 31 January, and the line never reopened. It closed formally on 17 April 1933.

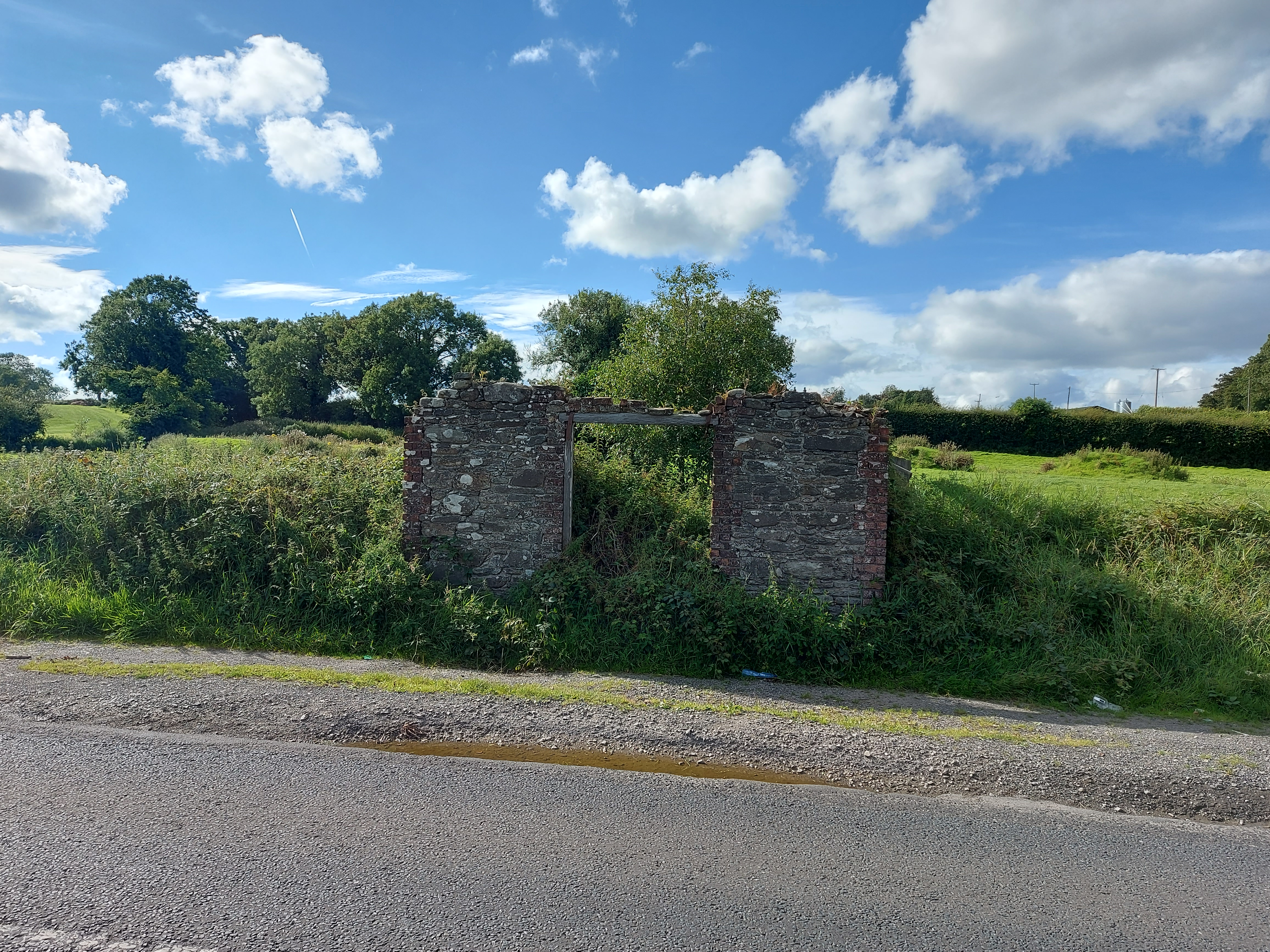
The only remaining evidence of the Crew halt of the Castlederg and Victoria Bridge Tramway is this derelict shed used to store agricultural products ready for transport.

== Routes ==
Preceding station	Disused railways	Following station
Spamount	Castlederg and Victoria Bridge Tramway; Castlederg to Victoria Bridge	Fyfin
