= Londonderry Cow Market railway station =

Railway station in Northern Ireland

Londonderry Cow Market

General information
- Location: County Londonderry, Northern Ireland; UK
- Coordinates: 54.987538°N 7.333072°W
- Elevation: 7 ft (2.1 m)

History
- Original company: Londonderry and Enniskillen Railway
- Post-grouping: Great Northern Railway (Ireland)

Key dates
- 19 April 1847: Station opens
- 18 April 1850: Station closes
Location

Londonderry Cow Market railway station served Derry, County Londonderry in Northern Ireland.

The Londonderry and Enniskillen Railway opened the station on 19 April 1847. It was the temporary terminus of the railway until Londonderry Foyle Road railway station was opened.

It closed on 18 April 1850.

== Routes ==
| Preceding station | Disused railways | Following station |
|---|---|---|
| Terminus | Londonderry and Enniskillen Railway; Londonderry to Enniskillen | Carrigans |

== See also ==
- Peace Bridge (Foyle)
- Derry~Londonderry Railway Station
- Londonderry Foyle Road railway station
- Londonderry Graving Dock railway station
- Londonderry Victoria Road railway station
