= Newtownstewart Town Hall =

Municipal Building in Newtownstewart, Northern Ireland

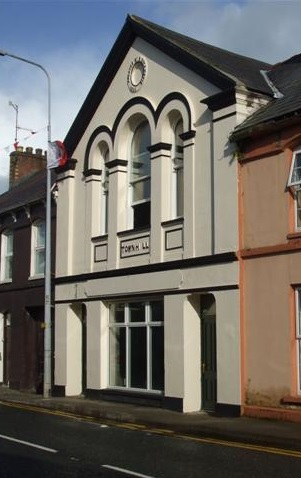
- Newtownstewart Town Hall

- Shown in Northern Ireland
- 54.7188°N 7.3772°W
- Location: Townhall Street, Newtownstewart

History
- Built: 1880

Site notes
- Architectural style: Italianate style

Listed Building – Grade B2
- Official name: 7 Townhall Street, Newtownstewart, County Tyrone
- Designated: 12 March 1986
- Reference no.: HB 10/04/045 B

Newtownstewart Town Hall is a municipal structure in Townhall Street, Newtownstewart, County Tyrone, Northern Ireland. The structure, which has been converted for use by the local amateur boxing club, is a Grade B2 listed building.

== History ==
The first building on the site was the home of Major Jones Crawford who saw action with the 12th (East Suffolk) Regiment of Foot at the Siege of Seringapatam in Southern India in 1799 during the Fourth Anglo-Mysore War. In 1879, the house was demolished and the site redeveloped by a local ironmonger, Bernard Gillespie, who saw an opportunity to establish a municipal building in the town.

The new building was designed in the Italianate style, built in brick with a stucco finish and was completed in 1880. The design involved a symmetrical main frontage with three bays facing onto Townhall Street; the ground floor was fenestrated by a central square-headed casement window which was flanked by openings containing recessed doorways with rectangular fanlights on either side. The first floor featured a prominent Venetian window incorporating pilasters and hood moulds. Below the window was a panel inscribed with the words "Town Hall" in raised lettering, whilst in the open gable above there was an oculus inscribed with the works "Erected by B. Gillespie 1880". At that time, Gillespie's name also appeared on a plate above one of the doors.

The building became the venue for the regular petty session hearings: cases heard by the magistrates during these hearings included a trial in 1919, when several individuals were charged with attacking two British soldiers in the village of Ardstraw. After the First World War, the building was acquired by the Gallagher family: it was used for concerts, dances and theatrical performances for much of the 20th century although the judicial use of the building ended in 1964 when petty session hearings in Newtownstewart were abolished.

After the building became the home of the Two Castles Amateur Boxing Club in 2012, extensive refurbishment works were carried out to update the building: these works included the installation of new toilets, changing rooms and kitchen facilities.
