= Londonderry Victoria Road railway station =

Railway station in Derry, Northern Ireland

Derry Victoria Road
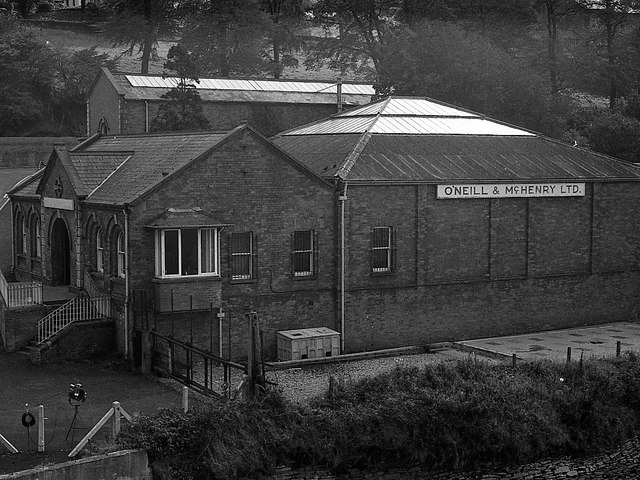
- Building when occupied by O'Neill & McHenry

General information
- Location: Victoria Road, Derry; County Londonderry; Northern Ireland
- Coordinates: 54.9893°N 7.3167°W

Construction
- Architect: James Barton

History
- Original company: Donegal Railway Company
- Post-grouping: County Donegal Railways Joint Committee

Key dates
- 6 August 1900: Station opens
- 1 January 1955: Station closes
Location

Londonderry Victoria Road railway station served Derry, County Londonderry, in Northern Ireland.

== History ==
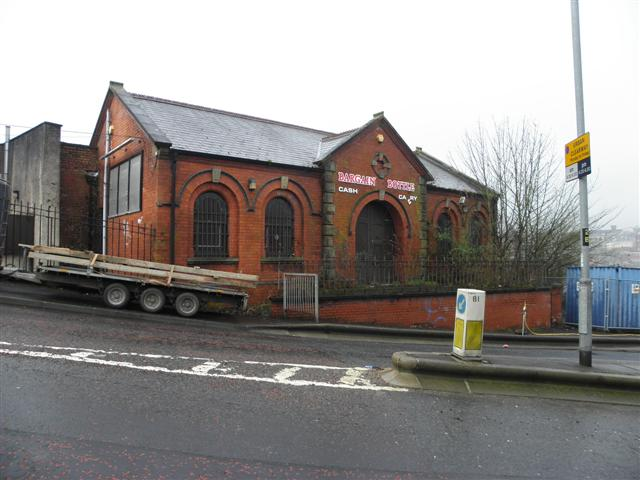
Former Victoria Road station buildings, now Bargain Bottle Cash and Carry

The station was opened by the Donegal Railway Company on 6 August 1900, when they decided to build their own line from Strabane to Derry to reduce the need for switching trains with the Great Northern Railway. It was built in red brick in 1899–1900 by R Campbell & Son of Belfast to designs by James Barton. Its front elevation faced the Craigavon Bridge.

It closed on 1 January 1955.

The station building was purchased by O'Neill & McHenry, a firm of wholesale grocers, who adapted it for storage purposes.

The former bonded warehouse which presently has the address of 6 Victoria Road has been inhabited by Dawson Hinds Office Furniture Centre since the early 1990s.

Between 1972 and 1978, part of the building was leased to the North West of Ireland Railway Society, which used it to house the Foyle Valley Railway Museum.

== Routes ==
Preceding station	Disused railways	Following station
Terminus	Donegal Railway Company; Londonderry to Strabane 1900–1955	New Buildings

== See also ==
- Peace Bridge (Foyle)
- Derry~Londonderry Railway Station
- Londonderry Cow Market railway station
- Londonderry Graving Dock railway station
- Londonderry Foyle Road railway station
