= Londonderry Foyle Road railway station =

Railway station in Derry, Northern Ireland

Londonderry Foyle Road
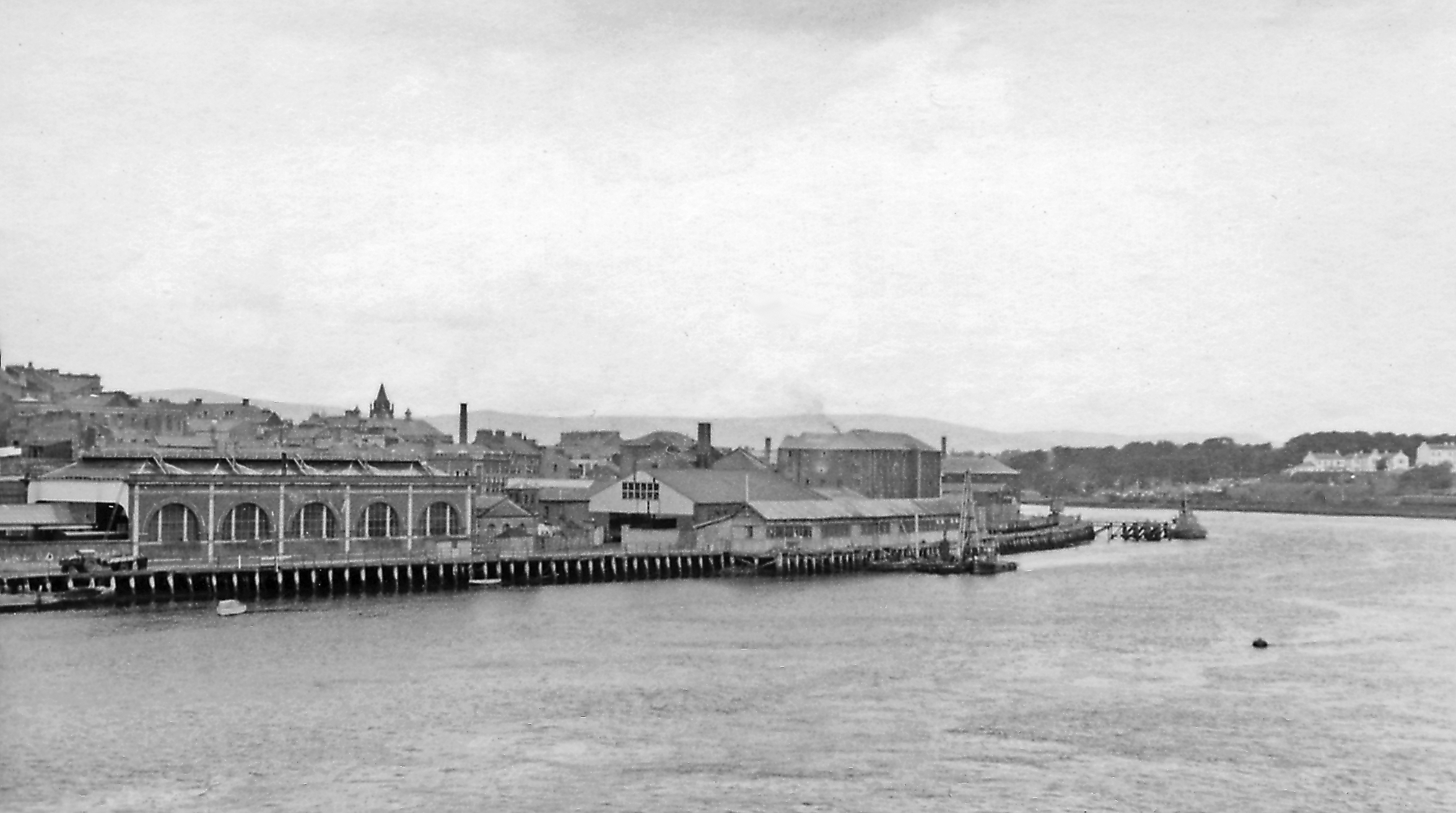
- The station, on the left of the photo, pictured from the Craigavon Bridge in 1960

General information
- Location: Foyle Road, Derry; County Londonderry; Northern Ireland
- Coordinates: 54.9907°N 7.3208°W

Other information
- Status: Demolished

History
- Original company: Londonderry and Enniskillen Railway
- Post-grouping: Great Northern Railway (Ireland)

Key dates
- 18 April 1850: Station opens
- 15 February 1965: Station closes
Location

Londonderry Foyle Road railway station was a railway terminus in the city centre of Derry, Northern Ireland.

== History ==
The Londonderry and Enniskillen Railway opened the station on 18 April 1850. It replaced Londonderry Cow Market railway station which had formed the temporary terminus of the line from Strabane since opening in 1847. The Railway later became part of the Great Northern Railway (Ireland) in 1883 and became the terminus for the Derry Road and Irish North Western lines.

The station was closed on 15 February 1965 when the Ulster Transport Authority controversially closed the Derry Road and was entirely demolished soon afterwards. The Foyle Valley Railway later had its terminus near to the same site.

== Routes ==
Preceding station	Disused railways	Following station
Terminus	Londonderry and Enniskillen Railway; Londonderry to Enniskillen	Carrigans

== See also ==
- Peace Bridge (Foyle)
- Derry~Londonderry (formerly Waterside) railway station
- Londonderry Cow Market railway station
- Londonderry Graving Dock railway station
- Londonderry Victoria Road railway station
