= River Derg =

River in Counties Donegal and Tyrone on the island of Ireland

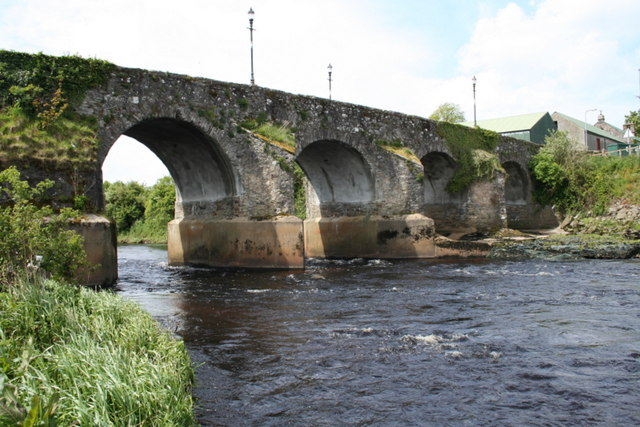
- River Derg and the Ardstraw Bridge
- Etymology: From Lough Derg, 'red lake'
- Native name: Abhainn na Deirge (Irish)

Location
- Country: Republic of Ireland, Northern Ireland

Physical characteristics
- Source
  - location: Lough Derg, County Donegal, Republic of Ireland
  - elevation: 138 metres (453 ft)
- Mouth: River Mourne
  - coordinates: 54°44′16″N 7°25′49″W
- Length: 45 km (28 mi)
- Basin size: 440 square kilometres (170 sq mi)
- Discharge
  - average: 16.2 m^{3}/s (570 cu ft/s)

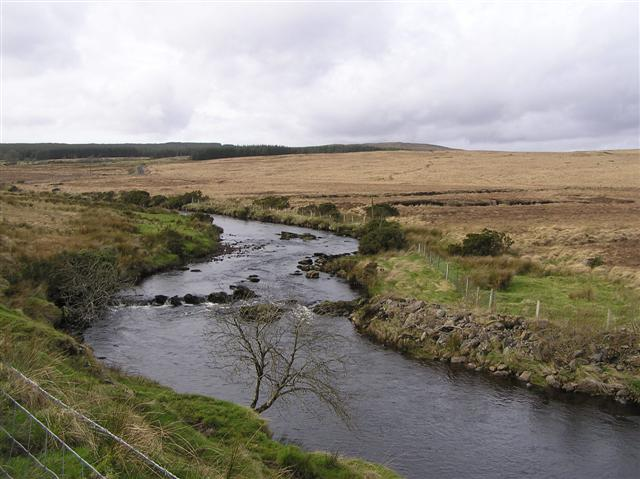
River Derg on the Northern Ireland side of the border

The River Derg is a small river in Ireland. The river has its source in Lough Derg, in County Donegal, Republic of Ireland, and it flows into County Tyrone, Northern Ireland, east through Castlederg to join with the River Strule to form the River Mourne. The upper reaches of the catchment are characterised by peatland, while the lower reaches flow predominantly through farmland. The River Derg's length is 28 miles (45 km).

The River Derg is known for its salmon, grilse and sea trout.

== See also ==
Rivers of Ireland
