= Robert McBride (poet) =

Robert McBride (1811/12–1895) was an Irish-Canadian poet. He was born in the parish of Urblereagh near the village of Ardstraw in County Tyrone, Ireland, sometime in late 1811 or early 1812.

== Early life ==
Following the death of his father McBride “secured the position of Seal Master or inspector of linens, in the Strabane Linen Hall, which position he held for six years." He then migrated to British North America, and after a stint in Hamilton moved to Haldimand County in Canada West (later Ontario) where he owned and operated a store.

He remained there until the mid-1850s at which time he removed to Port Franks, Ontario and became the first postmaster there. During his short tenure at Port Franks he became embroiled in local politics and some serious financial reverses which resulted in him serving time in debtors' prison in Sarnia.

Upon his release he secured a position as teacher in Warwick, Ontario in Lambton County, and then removed to Oil Springs in 1862. There he established himself as a merchant.

== Poetry ==
In 1869 he published his voluminous Poems satirical & sentimental on many subjects connected with Canada : including a complete exposure of our County court and Divisional court system in several theatrical acts & dialogues, showing how the people have been, and are now victimized, all tending to prove on the part of those indicated, a complete conspiracy set up by them for the purpose of enslaving the people of this country; also a dissertation on the doings of the Canada Company' s land, jobbing, and other matterswhich was published in London, Ontario. The poetry and some accompanying essays describe his various trials and tribulations in poetic form, and target many of his opponents. McBride was an arch-Orangeman, an affiliation that came through in his next publication The Canadian Orange minstrel for 1870 : written for the purpose of keeping in remembrance the dark doings and designs of popery in this country : an antidote for Pamphile Lemay's songs, & cThere is no evidence that McBride published poetry after 1870. However, in 1879 it was noted that he was "the sweet singer of Oil Springs, whose 'Lament of Annie Magee' and other poems, written in the Spenserian stanza have given him considerable local reputation as a poet . . ."

== Later life ==
He continued to live in Oil Springs until his death on 7 November 1895. McBride was married twice and by his first wife (whose name is not now known) he had two sons, John (1841–1862) and William T. (born circa 1844—alive 1901). His second wife was Mary (born circa 1830-alive 1851/2) and they had a daughter Elizabeth(born circa 1850), but both appear to have died by 1861 at which time Robert McBride was listed as a widower living with his two sons.
