= Johnny Loughrey =

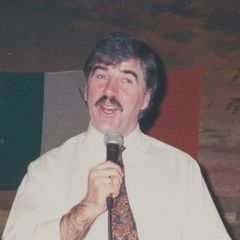

Background information
- Born: 20 July 1945; Newtownstewart, County Tyrone, Northern Ireland
- Died: 13 April 2005 (aged 59) Manchester, England
- Genres: Country, Irish, Easy Listening
- Years active: 1990–2005

Johnny Loughrey (20 July 1945 – 13 April 2005) was a Northern Irish singer and songwriter born in Newtownstewart, County Tyrone.With his mix of country songs, Irish ballads and easy listening music, he achieved success in both England and Ireland. Johnny's son Shaun Loughrey is also a Country and Irish singer.

== Discography ==
=== Albums ===
Loughrey recorded several albums :

- The Black Sheep (1990)
- Old Photographs (1991)
- Broken Engagement (1993)
- Through The Years (1994)
- Do You Know (1996)
- The Cold Hard Truth (1998)
- Run for the Border (1998)
- Walking in the Sunshine (2001)
- Wine & Roses (2003)
- All Together Now (2005)

Compilation album:

- The World of Johnny Loughrey (1997)

=== Videos/DVDs ===
- The World of Johnny Loughrey (1997)
