= Carrickmore railway station (County Donegal) =

Railway station in Ireland

Carrickmore

General information
- Location: County Donegal; Ireland
- Coordinates: 54.8970°N 7.4552°W

History
- Original company: Londonderry and Enniskillen Railway
- Post-grouping: Great Northern Railway (Ireland)

Key dates
- 19 April 1847: Station opens
- 1 February 1858: Station closes
Location

Carrickmore railway station was a relatively short-lived calling-point on the Londonderry and Enniskillen Railway between Derry and Strabane. Situated in the townland of Carrickmore, County Donegal, the station, which had opened on 19 April 1847, was closed to all traffic with effect from 1 February 1858.

== Routes ==
Preceding station	Disused railways	Following station
St Johnston	Londonderry and Enniskillen Railway; Londonderry to Enniskillen	Porthall
