= Derry ~ Londonderry railway station =

Railway station in Northern Ireland

Derry ~ Londonderry
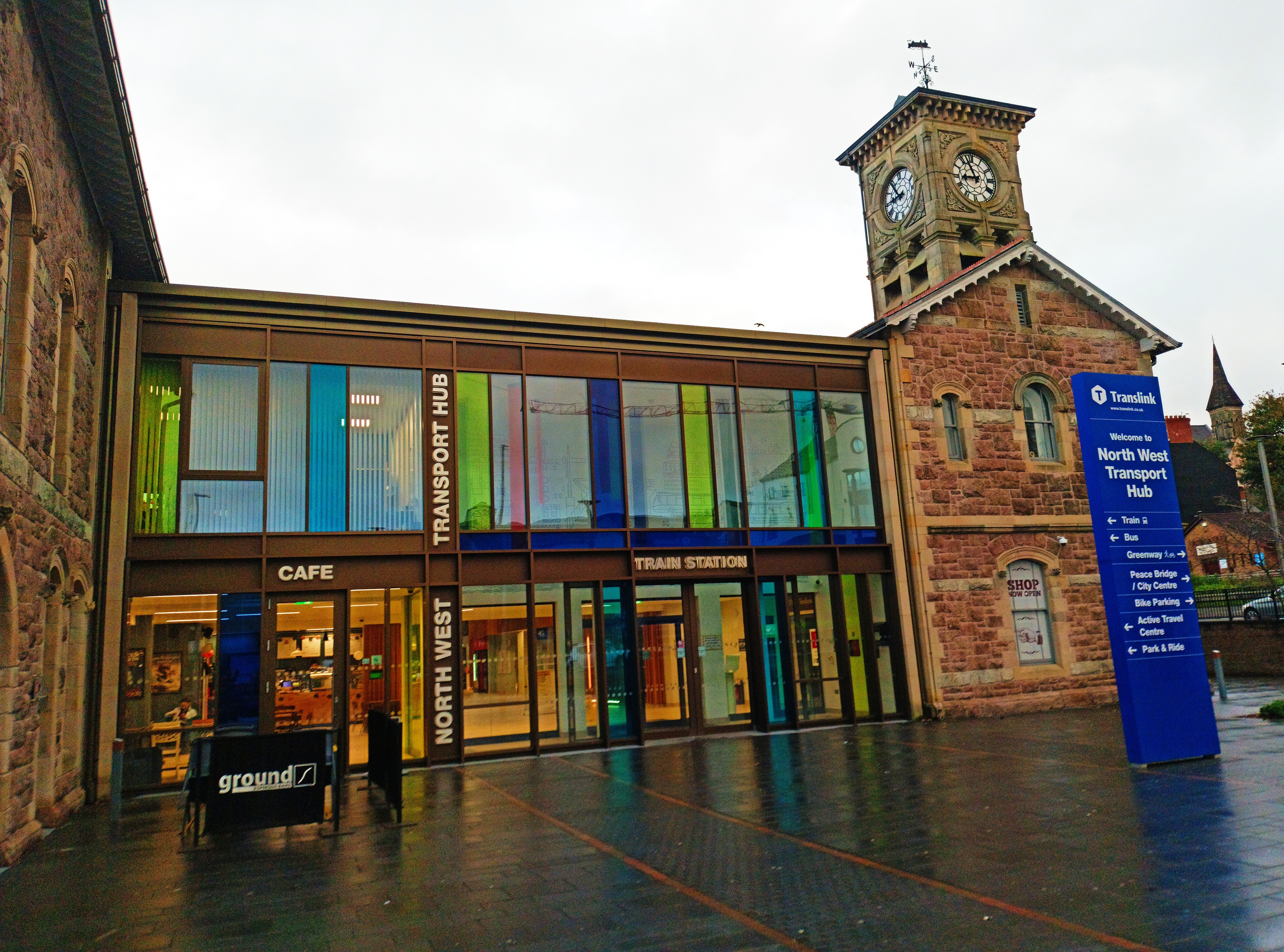
- Derry ~ Londonderry station frontage in 2023

General information
- Other names: North West Transport Hub
- Location: Waterside; Derry; Derry City and Strabane; Northern Ireland
- Coordinates: 54.992069°N 7.313788°W
- Owner: Translink
- Operator: NI Railways
- Line: Derry ~ Londonderry Line
- Platforms: 2
- Tracks: 2
- Bus routes: 2a, 2b, 2d, 3a, 3b, 3c, 4a, 4c, 5a, 7n, X3, X4
- Bus operators: Ulsterbus, Goldline, Foyle Metro
- Connections: Ulsterbus, Goldline and Foyle Metro

Construction
- Structure type: At-grade
- Parking: Yes (100 spaces)
- Architect: 1874: John Lanyon; 2019: Consarc Design

Other information
- Status: Open
- Station code: LY
- Fare zone: North West Zone / iLink Zone 4
- Website: www.translink.co.uk/Derry~Londonderry

History
- Former names: Londonderry Waterside
- Original company: Londonderry and Coleraine Railway
- Pre-grouping: Belfast and Northern Counties Railway; Northern Counties Committee
- Post-grouping: London, Midland and Scottish Railway (Northern Counties Committee)

Key dates
- 1852: Original station opened
- 1874: Relocated to Waterside station
- 1980: Relocated to replacement station
- 21 October 2019: Reopened at restored Waterside station as the North West Transport Hub

Passengers
- 2015/16: 324,089
- 2016/17: ▲339,900
- 2017/18: ▲449,661
- 2018/19: ▲540,781
- 2019/20: ▼529,606
- 2020/21: ▼124,548
- 2021/22: ▲467,001
- 2022/23: ▲723,776
- 2023/24: ▲952,126
- 2024/25: ▲963,312
- 2025/26: ▲1.040 million

Services
Preceding station	NI Railways	Following station
Terminus	Derry ~ Londonderry Line	Bellarena towards Belfast Grand Central

Historical railway lines
Preceding station	Londonderry and Coleraine Railway	Following station
Culmore; Line open, station closed	Londonderry and Coleraine Railway; Coleraine–Londonderry	Terminus
- NI Railways; Translink; NI railway stations
Track layout
Track and platform layout
(Click to expand)
Location
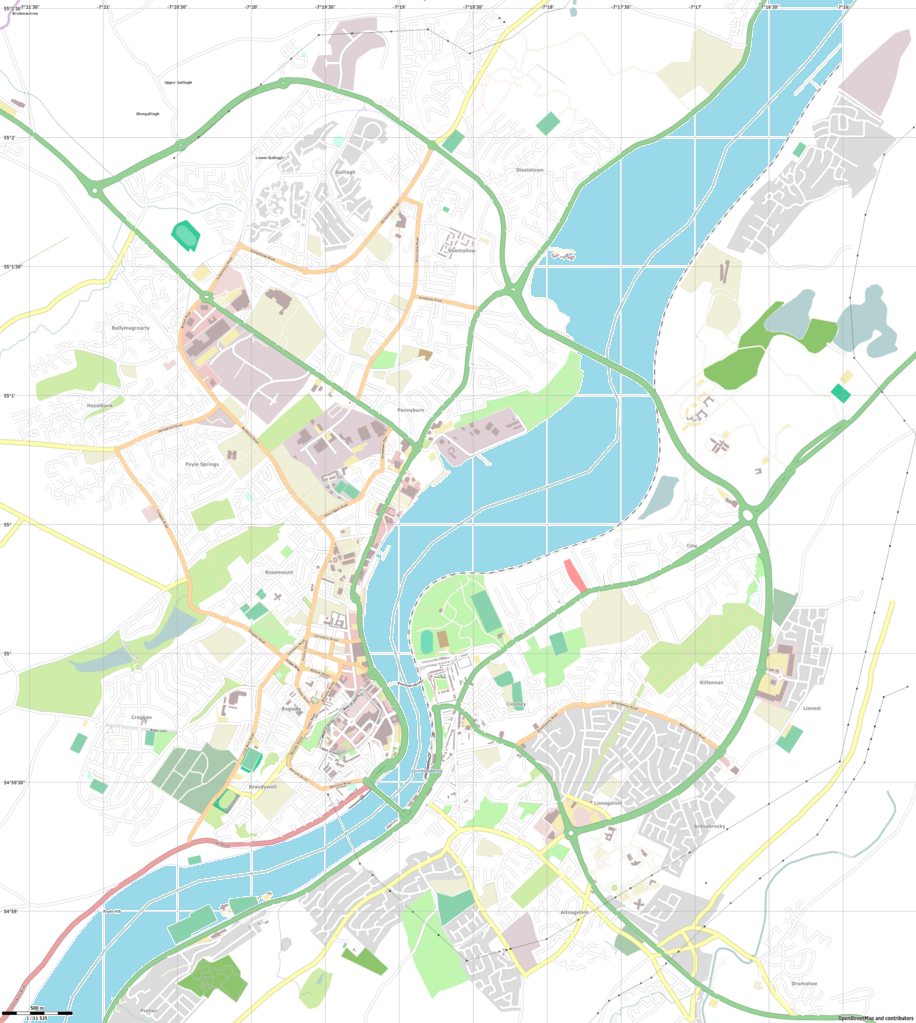
- Location within Derry Location within Northern Ireland Location within island of Ireland
- Location in Derry
Notes
- Passenger statistics are Translink railway station footfall counts rather than accredited passenger-journey statistics.

Derry ~ Londonderry railway station, also known as North West Transport Hub or Waterside railway station (formerly "Londonderry Waterside", and later just "Londonderry" railway station), is a railway terminus in Derry, Northern Ireland, on the east bank of the River Foyle, operated by Northern Ireland Railways and its 7th busiest station across the network with 952,126 passengers boarding or alighting at the station in the 2023/24 financial year. It is on the Belfast–Derry railway line, terminating at Belfast Grand Central. Derry/Londonderry has the longest platforms on the NIR Network, at 258.3 metres in length.

== History ==
The original Londonderry Waterside Station was opened on 29 December 1852 by Steven Alfred John Campbell, a well-known banker of the time. It was rebuilt into the current building by the Belfast & Northern Counties Railway in 1874.

Derry historically had four passenger termini. On the west side of the river, Graving Dock station served the Londonderry and Lough Swilly Railway and destinations to the west and Foyle Road station (which replaced the short-lived Cow Market station) served the Londonderry and Enniskillen Railway to Enniskillen via Strabane and Omagh. On the east side of the river, Victoria Road station served the alternative Donegal Railway Company (later Great Northern Railway) line to Strabane and Waterside station served the line to Belfast via the north coast. Although passenger trains terminated at these respective stations, all four railways were linked by freight lines through the city and the Craigavon Bridge.

Following the closure of the city's other railway termini, Waterside became Derry's only remaining railway station in 1965. The station was subsequently renamed *Londonderry*, dropping the *Waterside* suffix. Services were reduced and the railway infrastructure was rationalised, leaving the Belfast-Derry line predominantly single-track, with passing loops at Bellarena and Coleraine. The station is currently listed by Translink as Derry~Londonderry, while the restored former Waterside station building forms part of the North West Transport Hub.

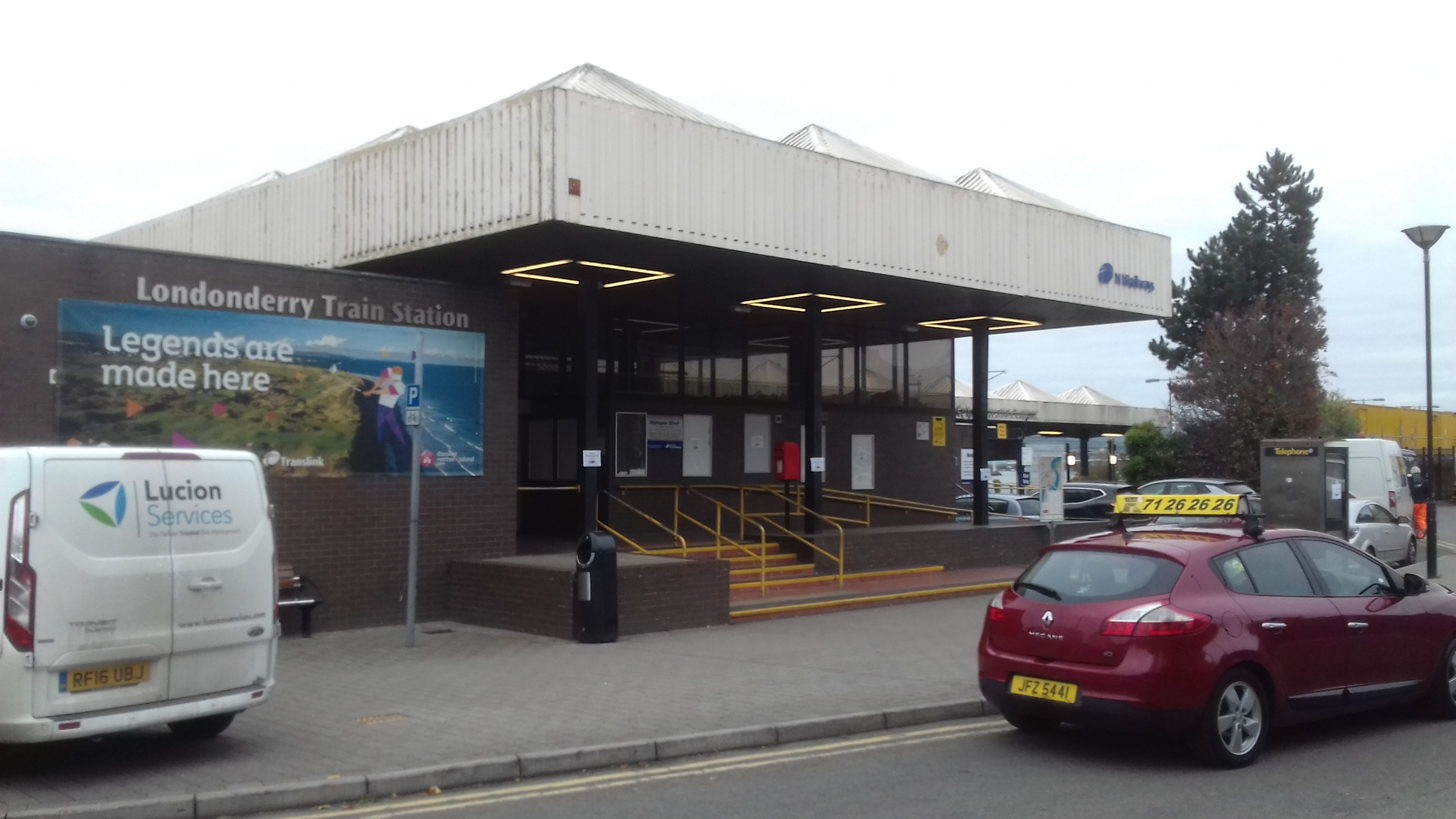
The 1980 station, in use until 2019.

The station was damaged in two terrorist attacks in the 1970s forcing it to be closed on 24 February 1980. A third station of the same name replaced the larger terminus in 1980.

Prior to Derry becoming the inaugural UK City of Culture in 2013, the railway line was upgraded with re-laid track, a track relay and sections of continuous welded rail

In 2010, the Minister for Regional Development, Conor Murphy, mooted the possibility of building a new railway station that would connect the railway with a planned foot and cycle bridge across the Foyle, bringing it closer to the centre of the city.

On 6 October 2016, Translink confirmed that the railway would be returning to the former BNCR Waterside station which will be used as a new transport hub for the city. As part of this work, platform 2 was taken out of use in September 2018 and the block section to Bellarena converted to One Train Working operation. The 1980 station closed on 8 October 2019 to allow the completion of work on the new station on the former site just to the north.

The new station is part of the North West Transport Hub and is on the site of the old Waterside Station. It opened for rail traffic on 21 October 2019, with the 1980s station being demolished on 5–6 December 2019.

== Design ==
The station uses the former train shed as a waiting room, café, and ticket hall for NIR services to and from Coleraine and Belfast. Two platforms are provided one on the river side of the former train shed, the other approximately on the site of the old arrival platform, with a siding adjacent to it for stabling empty stock.

The site of the former departure platform, next to the riverside greenway is unoccupied.

== Services ==
From Mondays to Saturdays as of 2024, an hourly service operates to Belfast Grand Central, reduced to every two hours on Sundays. Buses also serve the location which is being marketed as the North West Transport Hub.

== Gallery ==
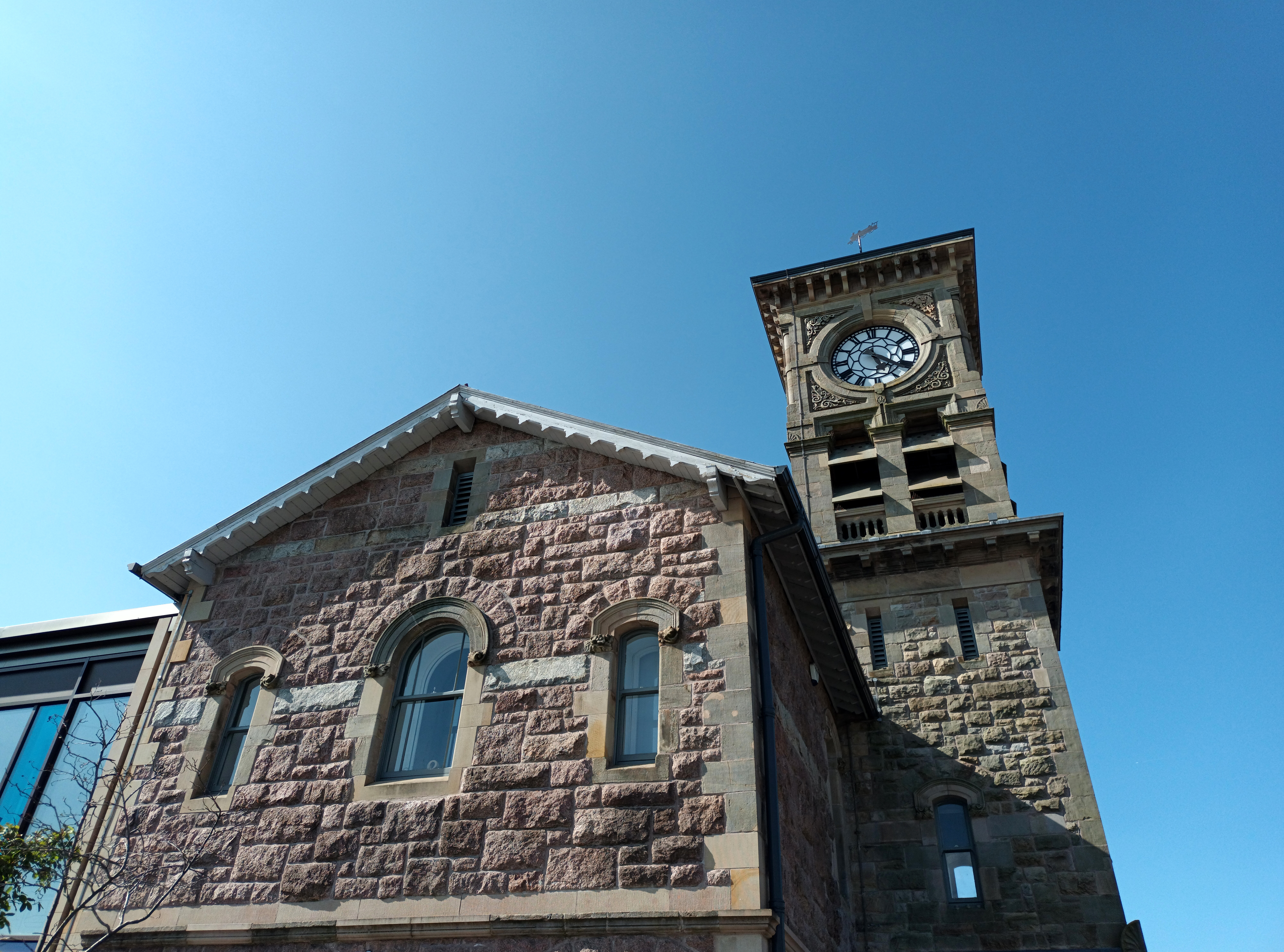
Northwest Transport hub Entrance as of 2023

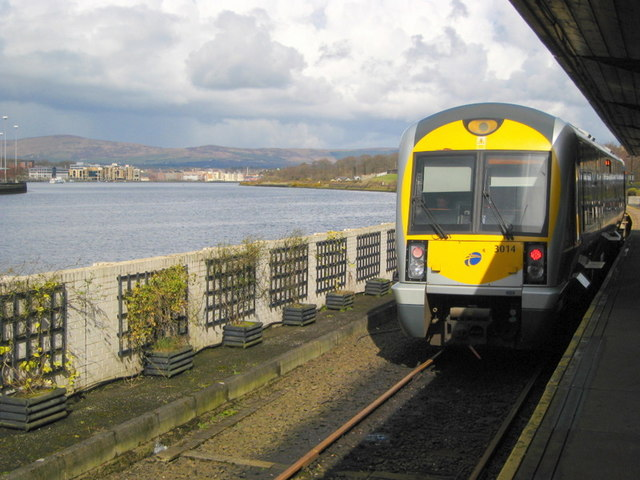
Class 3000 waiting to depart from the 1980 station to Belfast Great Victoria Street 30 March 2008

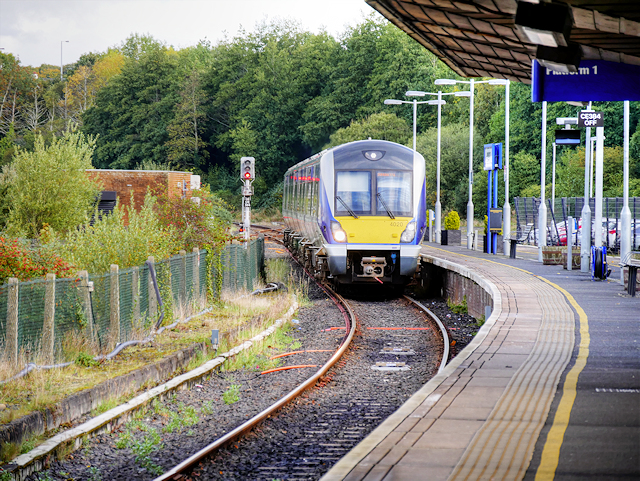
Class 4000 arriving at the 1980 station on 28 September 2017

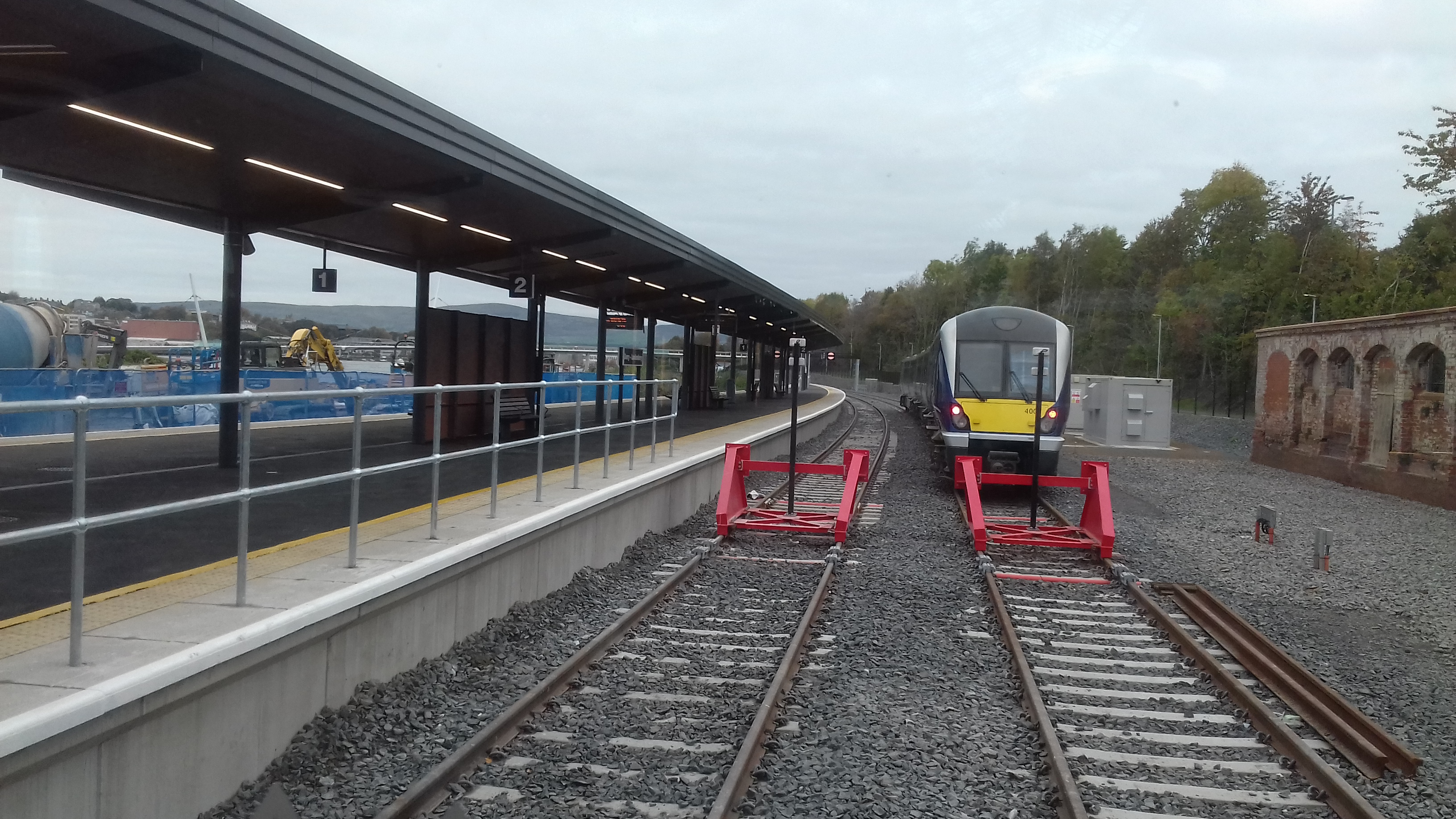
View of the Platforms

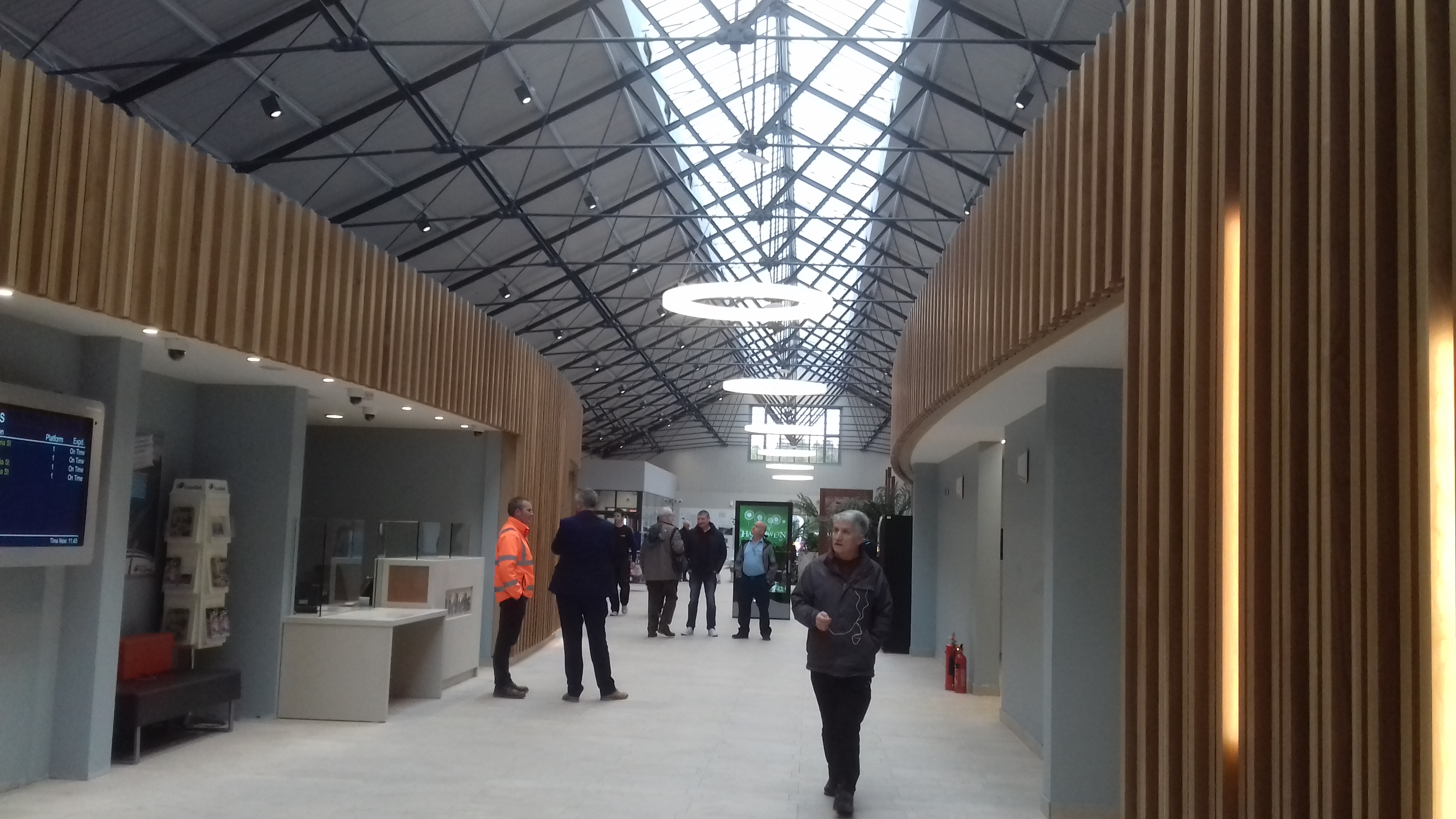
Inside the North West Transport Hub

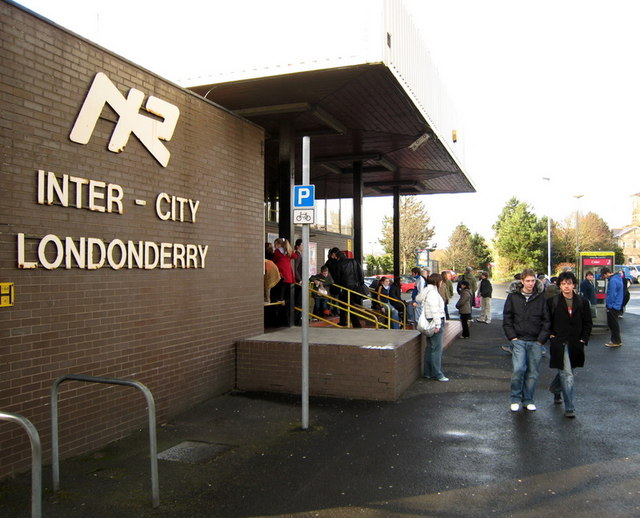
The 1980 station in 2008

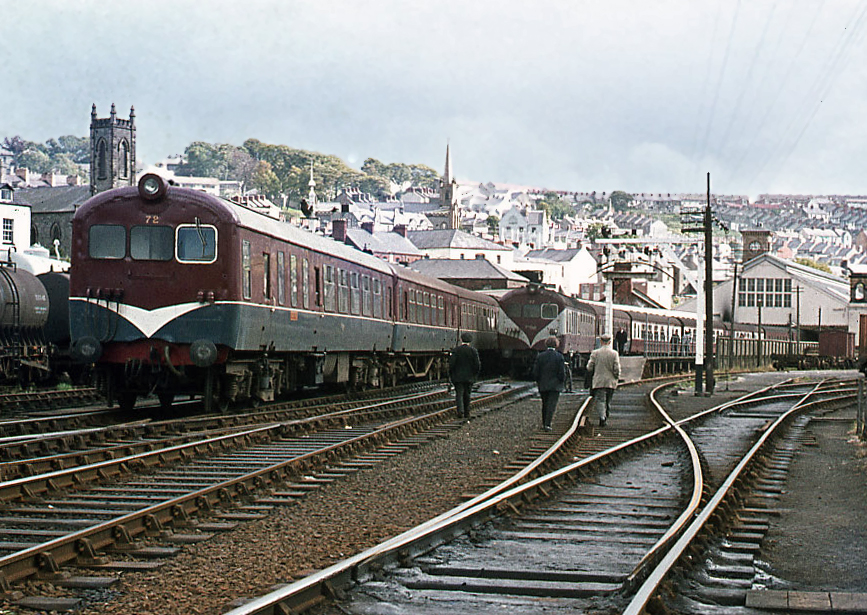
Two 70-class sets at Waterside Station 10 August 1974

== See also ==
- Peace Bridge (Foyle)
- Londonderry Cow Market railway station
- Londonderry Foyle Road railway station
- Londonderry Graving Dock railway station
- Londonderry Victoria Road railway station
