= Sion Mills railway station =

Railway station in County Tyrone, Northern Ireland

Sion Mills

General information
- Location: Sion Mills, County Tyrone, Northern Ireland; UK
- Coordinates: 54.785564°N 7.467236°W

History
- Original company: Londonderry and Enniskillen Railway
- Post-grouping: Great Northern Railway (Ireland)

Key dates
- 9 May 1852: Station opens
- 15 February 1965: Station closes
Location

Sion Mills railway station served Sion Mills, County Tyrone in Northern Ireland.

The Londonderry and Enniskillen Railway opened the station on 9 May 1852. It was taken over by the Great Northern Railway (Ireland) in 1883.

It closed on 15 February 1965.

== Routes ==
Preceding station	Disused railways	Following station
Strabane (GNI)	Londonderry and Enniskillen Railway; Londonderry to Enniskillen	Trafalgar (County Tyrone)
