= Carrigans railway station =

Railway station in County Donegal, Ireland

Coordinates: 54.9470°N 7.4192°W

Carrigans

General information
- Location: Foyle View Manor, Carrigans; County Donegal; Ireland

History
- Original company: Londonderry and Enniskillen Railway
- Post-grouping: Great Northern Railway (Ireland)

Key dates
- 19 April 1847: Station opens
- 15 February 1965: Station closes
Location
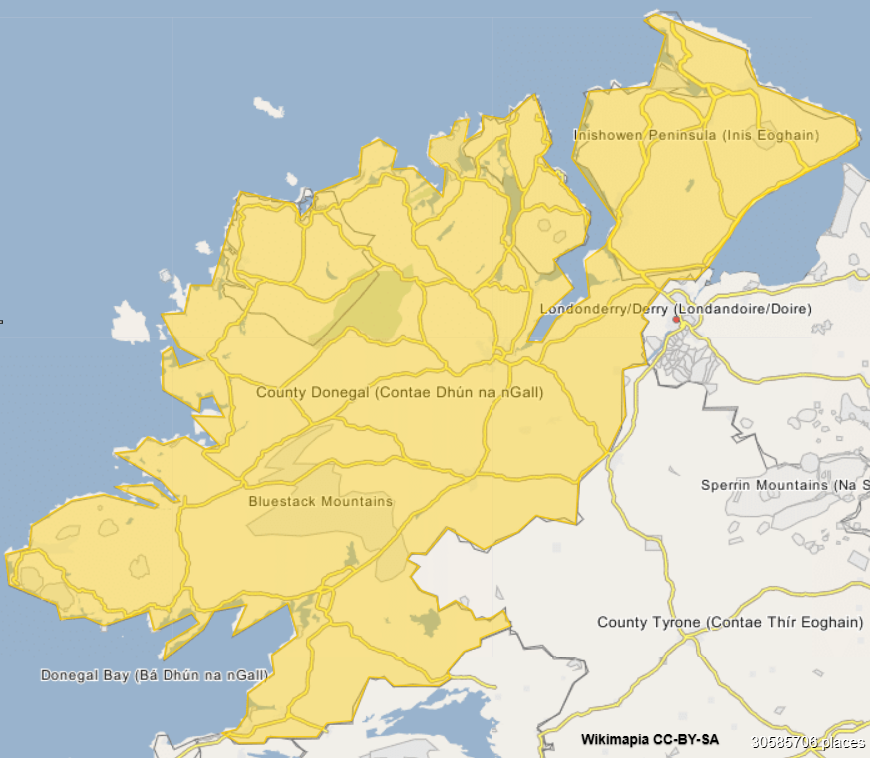
- Location within County Donegal Location within Ireland

Carrigans railway station served Carrigans, County Donegal, in Ireland.

== History ==
The Londonderry and Enniskillen Railway opened the station on 19 April 1847. It was taken over by the Great Northern Railway (Ireland) in 1883, and became part of the Ulster Transport Authority on dissolution of the GNR in 1958, but was staffed by CIÉ due to it being in the Republic.

The station was closed, as was the entire Derry Road line on 15 February 1965.

== Routes ==
Preceding station	Disused railways	Following station
Londonderry Cow Market	Londonderry and Enniskillen Railway; Londonderry to Enniskillen 1847-1850	St. Johnston
Londonderry Foyle Road	Londonderry and Enniskillen Railway; Londonderry to Enniskillen 1850-1965	St. Johnston
