= Londonderry Graving Dock railway station =

Railway station in Derry, Northern Ireland

Coordinates: 55.008852°N 7.318628°W

Londonderry Graving Dock

General information
- Location: Strand Road, Derry; Northern Ireland

Other information
- Status: Disused

History
- Original company: Londonderry and Lough Swilly Railway
- Pre-grouping: Londonderry and Lough Swilly Railway
- Post-grouping: Londonderry and Lough Swilly Railway

Key dates
- 12 November 1863: Station opens
- 6 September 1948: Station closes for passengers
- 10 August 1953: Station closes
Location

Londonderry Graving Dock railway station served Derry in Northern Ireland. It was the eastern terminus of the Londonderry and Lough Swilly Railway (L&LSR), a 3 foot gauge system of lines that extended westwards to County Donegal.

== History ==
The station was opened by the L&LSR on 12 November 1863.

The station closed to passengers on 6 September 1948, with passenger trains being replaced by the company's own buses until 2014 (when the L&LSR Company ceased trading and was liquidated). Freight services ended on 10 August 1953.

Preceding station	Historical railways	Following station
Londonderry Middle Quay	Londonderry and Lough Swilly Railway	Gallagh Road

== See also ==
- Peace Bridge (Foyle)
- Derry~Londonderry Railway Station
- Londonderry Cow Market railway station
- Londonderry Foyle Road railway station
- Londonderry Victoria Road railway station
