= Sion Mills =

Village in County Tyrone, Northern Ireland

Coordinates: 54.78535°N 7.47427°W

Sion Mills: Irish: Muileann an tSiáin
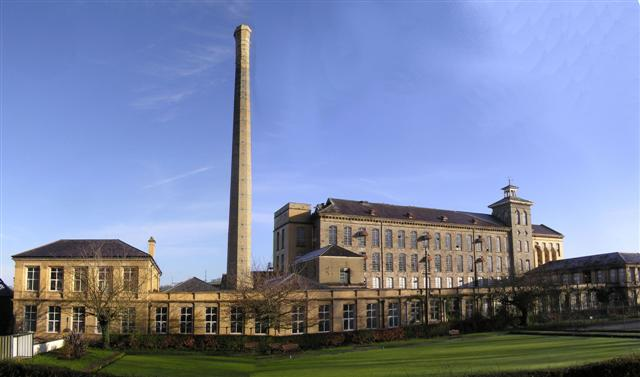
- Herdman's Mill

- Location within Northern Ireland
- Population: 1,970 (2021 census)
- Irish grid reference: H339932
  - Belfast: 84 mi (135 km)
- District: Strabane
- County: County Tyrone
- Country: Northern Ireland
- Sovereign state: United Kingdom
- Post town: STRABANE
- Postcode district: BT82
- Dialling code: 028, +44 28
- UK Parliament: West Tyrone

Sion Mills is a village to the south of Strabane in County Tyrone, Northern Ireland, on the River Mourne. In the 2021 census it had a population of 1,970 people. It is a tree-lined industrial village and designated conservation area, particularly rich in architectural heritage.

The village of Sion Mills was established by the Herdman family in 1835. The family operated a linen production mill in the village.

== History ==
The name Sion comes from the townland of Seein, which lies to the south of the village. It is an anglicisation of an Irish placename: either Suidhe Fhinn (meaning "seat of Finn") or Sidheán (also spelt Síodhán and Sián, meaning "fairy mound"). The second part of the name is the English "mill".

Sion Mills was laid out as a model linen village by the Herdman brothers, James, John and George. In 1835 they converted an old flour mill on the River Mourne into a flax spinning mill, and erected a bigger mill behind it in the 1850s. The River Mourne has powered industrial machinery here since 1640, according to civil surveys from the mid-17th century this was also the site of a former corn mill. After the site was bought in 1853 by The Herdman Brothers, the architectural company Lanyon, Lynn and Lanyon were hired to extend the compound. The mill was built with grey ashlar stone which was quarried locally in Douglas Bridge, the building was designed as a fireproof mill. The builder of the mill was John McCracken.

The mill opened in 1835 and worked until 2004. The model village which was created by the Herdman family also incorporated recreational amenities for locals such as a community centre, cricket, bowling and football clubs. These amenities can still be seen today for example, the Sion Mills cricket tradition, Sion Mills was used as the venue to celebrate when the Irish team beat a west Indian touring team in July 1969. The Herdman brothers were religious, and built Churches. For the first 30 years James Herdman used to beat a drum to call the people to church. The church was a converted building in the village where everyone gathered.

The work and theories of Robert Owen had a major influence on the development of Sion Mills and the model village. Robert Owen promoted experimental socialistic communities and transformed the village of New Lanark into a model community in the early 1800s, New Lanark provided high standard working conditions, education and shops which provided affordable good quality food. New Lanark became a model for industrial communities in the 19th and 20th centuries around the world for example, Sion Mills. The Herdman brothers, like Owen, believed in education for not only children but for adults too, they provided evening classes for adults. They also placed an emphasis on recreational activities and talent, in 1842 there was a village band and George Herdman provided singing-classes for the girls who worked in the Mill

However, nearly everything in Sion Mills today was designed later, in the 1880s and 1890s, by James Herdman's son-in-law, the English architect William Frederick Unsworth. Sion House, a half timbered Elizabethan style mansion originally built in the early 1840s, was largely remodelled and expanded in the 1880s by Unsworth, around the same time as he was designing the first Shakespeare Memorial Theatre in Stratford-upon-Avon (this theatre was destroyed by a fire in 1926). More modest half timbered buildings include the gatehouse, the Recreation Hall and Old St. Saviour's Church. Unsworth based his design for the polychrome Anglican church, the Church of the Good Shepherd (1909), on a church in Pistoia in Tuscany. This church is built in an Italian neo-Romanesque style. By contrast, the modern Church of St Teresa (1963, by Patrick Haughey), the Catholic place of worship, is admirable for its severely plain lines – a long rectangle with a striking representation of the Last Supper on the slate facade. Oisín Kelly was the artist.

A prominent local landlord and businessman in the area in the early 20th century was Brigadier General Ambrose St. Quentin Ricardo, C.M.G., C.B.E., D.S.O., Q.S.A. (1866–1923), a director of Herdman's Ltd.. Born at Gatcombe Park, his family's seat in Gloucestershire in Britain, he had married Elizabeth Alice ('Ella') Herdman in Thyet Myo in Burma (then a part of the Raj) in 1893 and had settled in Sion Mills around 1903. He was largely instrumental in having the Church of the Good Shepherd built in the village, construction beginning in 1909. He and his wife carried out many other improvements to the village, and they were amongst the founders of the Derry Feis. Brig. Gen. Ricardo was buried in the vestibule of the church upon his death in 1923. He was a great-grandson of the famous political economist David Ricardo (1772–1823).

At its peak the mill employed 1500 people. By the 2000s, China had begun to dominate the linen market across Europe and this led to the closure of Herdmans Ltd production in Sion Mills in 2004, resulting in the loss of 600 jobs.

== Demography ==
On Census Day (27 March 2011) the usually resident population of Sion Mills Settlement was 1,907 accounting for 0.11% of the NI total. Of these:

- 99.90% were from the white (including Irish Traveller) ethnic group;
- 63.29% belong to or were brought up in the Catholic religion and 35.55% belong to or were brought up in a 'Protestant and Other Christian (including Christian related)' religion
- 34.66% indicated that they had a British national identity, 33.56% had an Irish national identity and 36.76% had a Northern Irish national identity

== Sport ==
Sion Mills has a strong cricket tradition and was the venue for a celebrated moment in cricket history when the Irish team beat a West Indian side in July 1969. Sion Mills Cricket Club plays in the North West Senior League.

== Transport ==
Sion Mills railway station opened on 9 May 1852 and shut on 15 February 1965.
