= Spamount =

Village in County Tyrone, Northern Ireland

Coordinates: 54.711°N 7.550°W

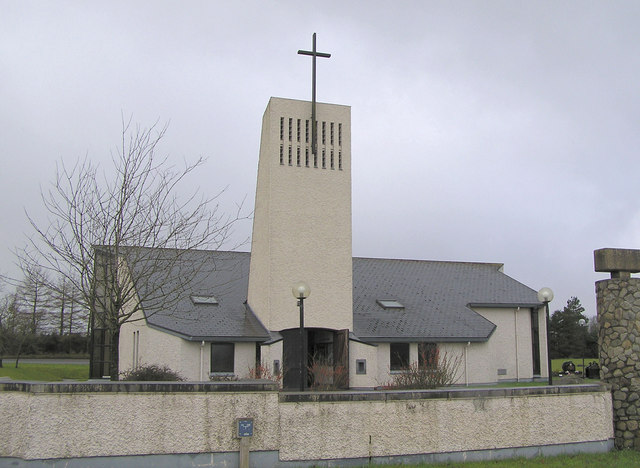
St Francis (Roman Catholic) Church, Spamount

Spamount is a townland (of 88 acres) and small village in County Tyrone, Northern Ireland, near Castlederg. It is situated in the historic barony of Strabane Lower and the civil parish of Ardstraw. In the 2001 Census it had a population of 309 people. It is in the Derry City and Strabane District Council area and has a small community hall and its own sports ground.

== Sport ==
- Spamount is home to local football team, the Spamount Swifts founded in 2002.
