= Ardstraw =

Village in County Tyrone, Northern Ireland

Coordinates: 54°43′57″N 7°27′28″W

Ardstraw: Irish: Ard Sratha
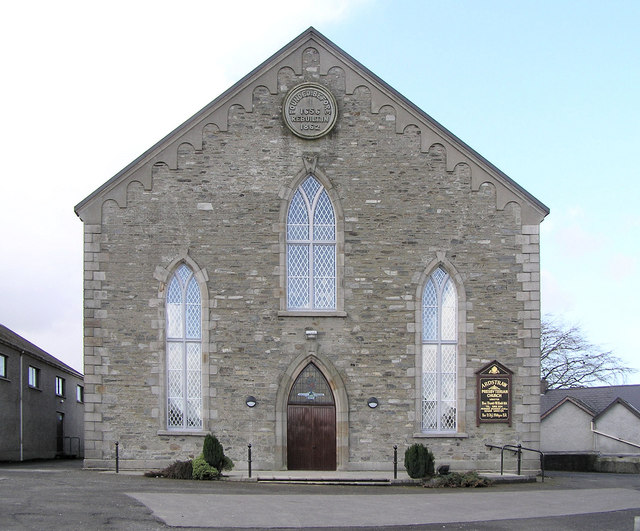
- Ardstraw Presbyterian Church

- Location within Northern Ireland
- Population: 204 (2021 census)
- Irish grid reference: H348874
- District: Derry City and Strabane
- County: County Tyrone
- Country: Northern Ireland
- Sovereign state: United Kingdom
- Post town: OMAGH
- Postcode district: BT78
- Dialling code: 028
- UK Parliament: West Tyrone
- NI Assembly: West Tyrone

Ardstraw (from Irish: Ard Sratha (hill or height of the holm or strath)) is a small village, townland and civil parish in County Tyrone, Northern Ireland, three miles northwest of Newtownstewart. In the 2021 census, it had a population of 204 people.

== Bishopric ==
The Diocese of Ardstraw was founded in the 6th century by Saint Eoghan. It is one of the dioceses recognized by the Synod of Ráth Breasail in 1111. Although the 1152 Synod of Kells replaced it in its list of dioceses with that of Maghera, the seat of which was later moved to Derry, bishops of Ardstraw continued to exist until the early 13th century, when the see was finally united to that of Derry.

No longer a residential bishopric it is today listed by the Catholic Church as a titular see.

In 1198, John de Courcy, a Norman knight who had invaded Ulster in 1177, destroyed the church of Ardstraw on his way to Inishowen.

== Geography ==
=== Civil parish of Ardstraw ===
The parish is largely situated in the historic barony of Strabane Lower and partly in Omagh West. The parish contains the following towns and villages:

- Ardstraw
- Newtownstewart
- Spamount
- Victoria Bridge

=== Townlands ===
The civil parish contains the following townlands:

- Aghafad, Aghasessy, Altdoghal, Archill, Ardbarren Lower, Ardbarren Upper, Ardstraw
- Backhill, Ballought, Ballyfolliard, Ballymullarty, Ballynaloan, Ballyrenan, Barons Court, Beagh, Binnawooda, Birnaghs, Bloomry, Bolaght, Breen, Brocklis, Bunderg, Byturn
- Carnaveagh, Carncorran Glebe, Carnkenny, Carrickadartan, Cashty, Castlebane, Cavandarragh, Clady Blair, Clady Haliday, Clady Hood, Clady Johnston, Clady-sproul (also known as Liscreevaghan), Clare Upper, Claremore, County Tyrone, Cloghogle (also known as Glenknock), Cloonty, Concess, Coolaghy, Coolcreaghy, Coolnacrunaght, Coolnaherin Park, Creevy, County Tyrone, Crew Lower, Crew Upper, Crosh, County Tyrone, Croshballinree
- Deer Park Lower (also known as Deer Park Old), Deer Park Middle, Deer Park Upper (also known as Deer Park New), Derrygoon, Douglas (also known as Ligfordrum), Drumclamph, Drumlegagh, Drumnabey, Drumnahoe, Dunrevan, Dunteige
- Envagh, Erganagh
- Fyfin
- Gallan Lower, Gallan Upper, Garvetagh Lower, Garvetagh Upper, Glasmullagh, Glenglush, Glenknock (also known as Cloghogle), Golan Adams, Golan Hunter, Golan Sproul, Grange
- Killeen, Killydart, Killymore, Kilreal Lower, Kilreal Upper, Kilstrule, Knockbrack, Knockiniller, Knockroe
- Laragh, Largybeg, Legland, Legnabraid, Letterbin, Lettercarn, Ligfordrum (also known as Douglas), Liscreevaghan (also known as Clady-sproul), Lislafferty, Lisleen, Lisnacreaght, Lisnafin, Lisnatunny Glebe, Listymore, Lurganboy
- Magheracoltan, Magheracreggan, Magheralough, Meaghy, Milltown, Moyle Glebe, Mullagh, Mulvin
- Newtownstewart
- Priestsessagh, Pubble
- Rakelly, Ratyn
- Scarvagherin, Sessagh of Gallan, Shanog, Shanonny East, Shanonny West, Skinboy, Skinboy Mountain, Spamount, Stonewalls, Stonyfalls, Strahulter, Straletterdallan,
- Tamnagh, Tievenny, Tirmegan, Tullymuck
- Upperthird, Urbalreagh
- Whitehouse

Ardstraw townland itself covers an area of 353 acres. The population of the townland declined during the 19th century:

Year	1841	1851	1861	1871	1881	1891
Population	156	132	144	88	71	56
Houses	34	27	30	20	14	12

== Sport ==
Ardstraw F.C. plays association football in the Northern Ireland Intermediate League.

== Notable people ==
- Saint Éogan, was the founder of the monastery of Ardstraw
- Robert McBride, (1811/12–1895), poet
- Giolla Brighde Mac Con Midhe (c. 1210 – c. 1272), poet
- Edward Stevenson, Grand Master of the Orange Order since 2011

== See also ==
- Robert McBride (1811-1895)
- List of townlands of County Tyrone
