= Newtownstewart =

Coordinates: 54°43′N 7°24′W

Newtownstewart: Irish: An Baile Nua
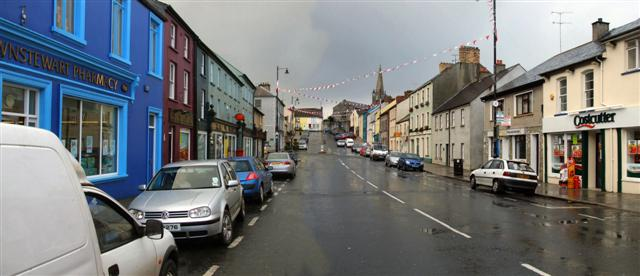
- Main Street in Newtownstewart

- Location within Northern Ireland
- Population: 1,414 (2021 census)
- District: Derry City and Strabane
- County: County Tyrone
- Country: Northern Ireland
- Sovereign state: United Kingdom
- Post town: OMAGH
- Postcode district: BT78
- Dialling code: 028
- Police: Northern Ireland
- Fire: Northern Ireland
- Ambulance: Northern Ireland
- UK Parliament: West Tyrone
- NI Assembly: West Tyrone

Newtownstewart is a village and townland of 540 acres (219 ha) in County Tyrone, Northern Ireland. It is overlooked by hills called Bessy Bell and Mary Gray and lies on the River Strule below the confluence with its tributary the Owenkillew. It is situated in the historic barony of Strabane Lower and the civil parish of Ardstraw. In the 2021 census it had a population of 1,414 people. It lies within the Derry City and Strabane District Council area.

== History ==
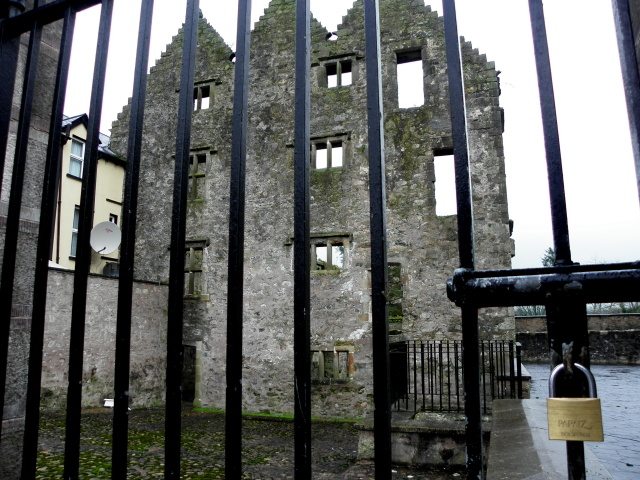
The ruins of Newtownstewart Castle

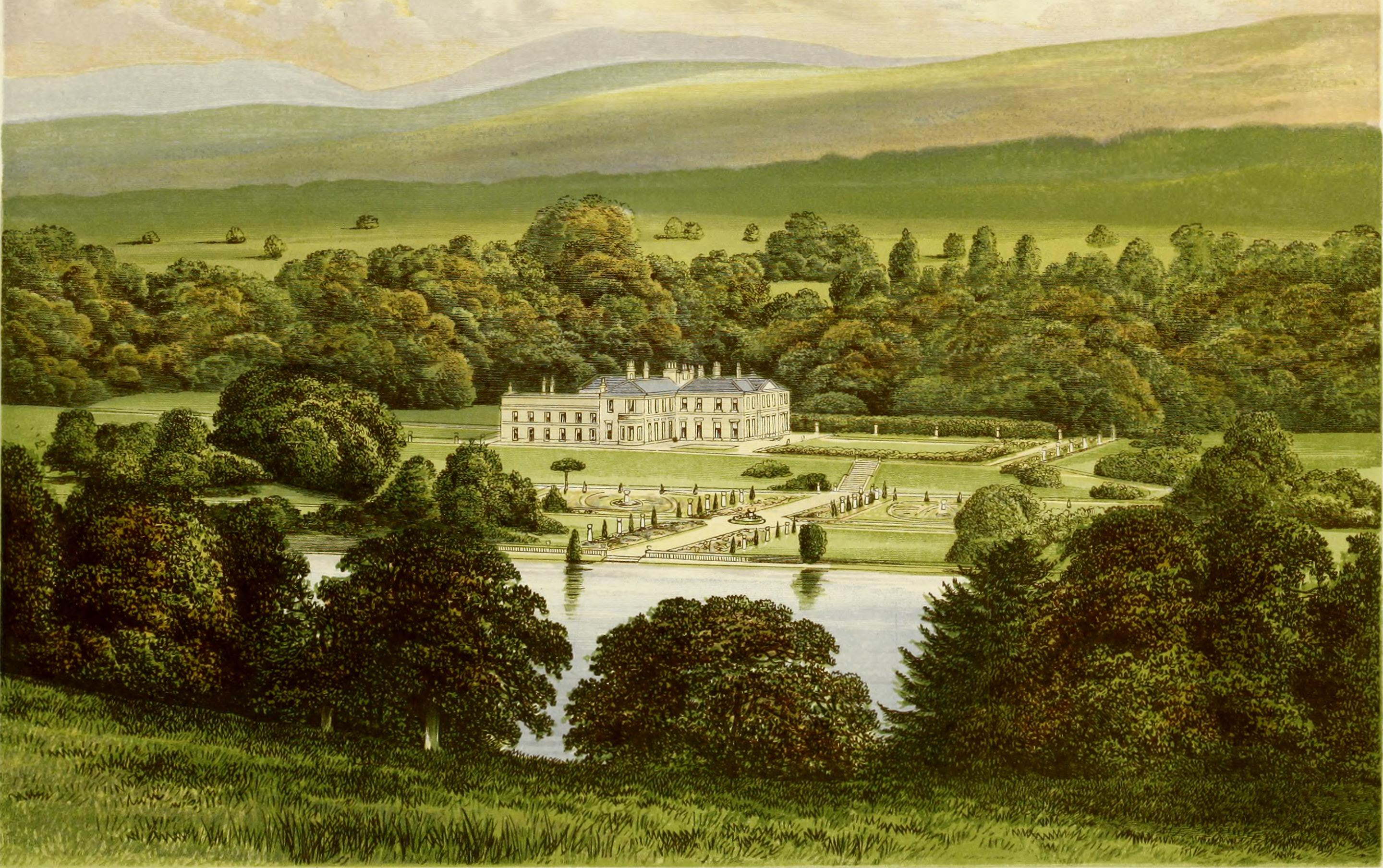
Baronscourt in 1879, from The County Seats of the Noblemen and Gentlemen of Great Britain and Ireland, by Francis Orpen Morris

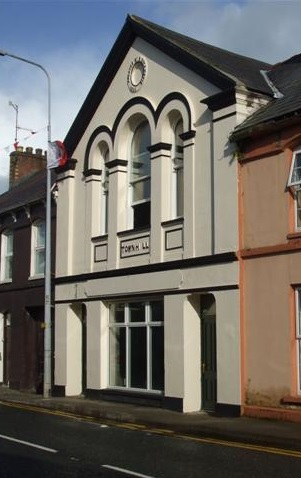
Newtownstewart Town Hall

The townland of Newtownstewart was historically called Lislas. Newtownstewart Castle was built by Sir Robert Newcomen in 1615 as part of the Plantation of Ulster. The castle was acquired by Sir William Stewart when he married Newcomen's second daughter in 1629. The castle and town were renamed Newtownstewart by Sir William Stewart after his birthplace.

The former Northern Bank building on the corner was the scene of an infamous murder in 1871 when bank cashier William Glass was robbed of £1,600 and killed. Assistant District Inspector Thomas Hartley Montgomery, of the Royal Irish Constabulary, who was in charge of the investigation, was subsequently tried, convicted, and hanged at Omagh Gaol. (Note: There was a very early dramatisation in BBC television, of "Death at Newton-Stewart, a reconstruction of an unparalleled murder of the 'seventies, extracted from the records of the Ulster Assizes.")

Newtownstewart Town Hall, which was the venue for petty session hearings, was completed in 1880.

== Royal Visit ==
The Duke and Duchess of York visited the 3rd Duke of Abercorn, then Governor of Northern Ireland, at Baronscourt as part of their Royal Visit to Northern Ireland in 1924.

== Sport ==
Naomh Eoghan club is the local Gaelic Athletic Association club.

Ardstraw Football Club is the local football club. The club participates in the Irish Cup.

== Demographics ==
On Census Day 27 March 2011, in Newtownstewart Settlement, considering the resident population:

- 99.74% were from the white (including Irish Traveller) ethnic group;
- 52.87% belong to or were brought up in the Catholic religion and 45.84% belong to or were brought up in a 'Protestant and Other Christian (including Christian related)' religion; and
- 43.58% indicated that they had a British national identity, 25.53% had an Irish national identity and 33.33% had a Northern Irish national identity*.
- Respondents could indicate more than one national identity

Considering the population aged 3 years old and over:

- 11.82% had some knowledge of Irish;
- 7.59% had some knowledge of Ulster-Scots; and
- 1.68% did not have English as their first language.

== People ==
- Thomas Burnside (1782–1851), member of the United States House of Representatives from Pennsylvania and associate justice of the Supreme Court of Pennsylvania, born near Newtownstewart.
- Thomas Maclear (1794–1879), Astronomer Royal at the Cape of Good Hope, was born in Newtownstewart.
- Dukes of Abercorn, reside at Baronscourt, near Newtownstewart
- Johnny Loughrey, singer born in Newtownstewart in 1945, died in 2005.
- Jude Gallagher, amateur boxer, won multiple Irish Titles, World Youth Bronze and Commonwealth Games Featherweight Champion, 2022
- Jacob Stockdale, Ulster and Ireland rugby player, was born in Newtownstewart.

== Transport ==
Construction of the Irish gauge (Irish Standard Gauge), Londonderry and Enniskillen Railway (L&ER) began in 1845 and reached Strabane in 1847. By 1852 it had extended to Newtownstewart and Omagh and its terminus in Enniskillen was reached in 1854. The company was absorbed into the Great Northern Railway (Ireland) in 1883. Newtownstewart railway station opened on 9 May 1852 and finally closed on 15 February 1965.

== See also ==
- List of towns and villages in Northern Ireland
