= Castlederg and Victoria Bridge Tramway =

Closed railway in Northern Ireland

Coordinates: 54.707°N 7.593°W

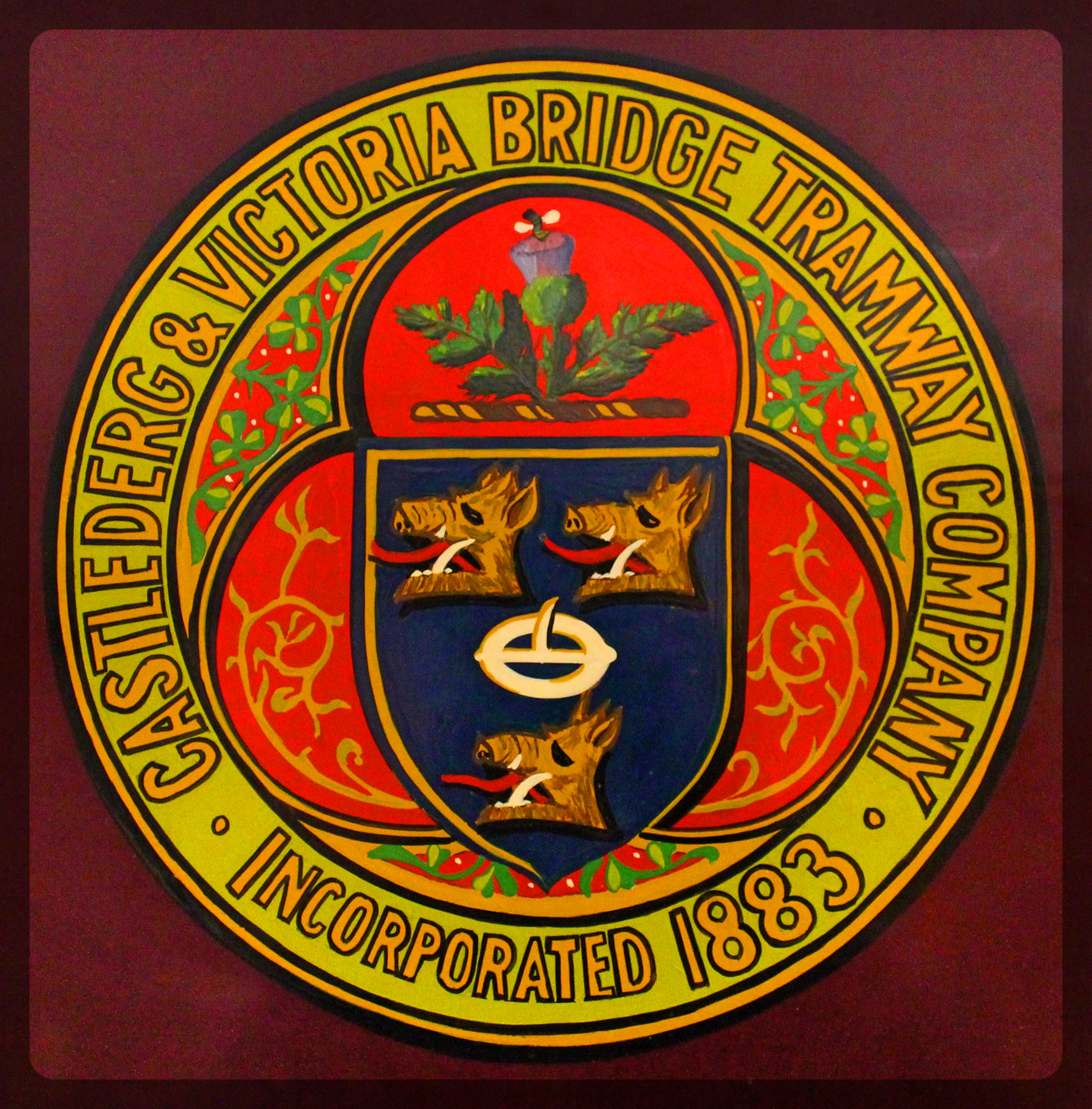

Overview
- Dates of operation: 1883–1933

Technical
- Track gauge: 3 ft (914 mm)
- Length: 7 1/4 miles (11.7 km)

The Castlederg and Victoria Bridge Tramway was a 3 ft (914 mm) narrow gauge railway operating in County Tyrone, Northern Ireland. It opened in 1883 and closed in 1933.

== Route ==
This 7 1/4-mile (11.7 km) long line was situated entirely within County Tyrone, linking the market town of Castlederg through Spamount, Crew and Fyfin to Victoria Bridge (a junction with the main line of the Great Northern Railway). The line followed the course of the road for almost its entire length, and there were passing loops at Spamount and Crew.

== Early years ==
The Great Northern Railway reached Victoria Bridge in 1852. Plans for a narrow gauge rail link to Castlederg were agreed at a public meeting held in the town in August 1881. The line was constructed shortly prior to the enactment of the Tramways and Public Companies (Ireland) Act 1883 (46 & 47 Vict. c. 43), and opened in April 1883, so the promoters lost out on any financial assistance from the government. Because of a sharp gradient on the approach to Victoria Bridge, all trains had to be equipped with a Westinghouse continuous braking system – the first trains in Ireland to be so equipped. The line's first two steam locomotives were fitted with enclosed bodywork as tram engines.

== Final years ==
A 24-seat railcar was built with a Fordson paraffin engine in 1925 at Castlederg. Although basic in design, it was capable of being driven from either end and the driver also sold the tickets. From 1925 the Tramway became loss making, reaching virtual insolvency by 1932. A strike disrupted Northern Ireland's rail network between 31 January and 7 April 1933. This was taken as an opportunity to discontinue services. The last steam engine departed from Castlederg on 27 July 1934 hauling redundant rolling stock to Victoria Bridge for auction. The need for transhipment of all freight at the break of gauge between the 3 ft (914 mm) Tramway and the 5 ft 3 in (1,600 mm) gauge Great Northern Railway at Victoria Bridge was time-consuming, inefficient and expensive. By the 1930s the railway's Victorian-era infrastructure was also in need of substantial investment. The line became one of Northern Ireland's earliest casualties of road competition. At the end in 1933, there was a Hudswell Clarke 2-6-0T locomotive (sold to Clogher Valley Railway), a Hudswell Clarke 0-4-4T locomotive and a Beyer, Peacock & Company Isle of Man type 2-4-0T locomotive which had come from the Ballymena and Larne Railway.

== See also ==
- Cavan and Leitrim Railway
- County Donegal Railways Joint Committee
- List of narrow-gauge railways in Ireland
