= Londonderry and Enniskillen Railway =

Railway in Ireland

Coordinates: 54.994°N 7.326°W

- Industry: Railway
- Founded: 1845
- Defunct: 1883
- Fate: taken over
- Successor: Great Northern Railway (Ireland)
- Headquarters: Derry, Ireland
- Area served: Counties Donegal, Fermanagh, Londonderry, Tyrone

The Londonderry and Enniskillen Railway (L&ER) was an Irish gauge (5 ft 3 in (1,600 mm)) railway in Ireland.

== Construction and opening ==
Londonderry and Enniskillen Railway Act 1845
- Act of Parliament
- Parliament of the United Kingdom
- Long title: An Act for making a Railway from Londonderry to Enniskillen.
- Citation: 8 & 9 Vict. c. xcviii

Dates
- Royal assent: 21 July 1845

Londonderry and Enniskillen Railway Amendment Act 1846
- Act of Parliament
- Parliament of the United Kingdom
- Long title: An Act to enable the Londonderry and Enniskillen Railway Company to alter and extend the Line of such Railway, to make a Branch therefrom to the Town of Omagh, and to amend the Act relating thereto.
- Citation: 9 & 10 Vict. c. cccxviii

Dates
- Royal assent: 3 August 1846

Other legislation
- Repealed by: Londonderry and Enniskillen Railway Consolidation Act 1852

Status: Repealed

Londonderry and Enniskillen Railway Amendment Act 1848
- Act of Parliament
- Parliament of the United Kingdom
- Long title: An Act to authorize the Abandonment of a Portion of the Londonderry and Enniskillen Railway, and the Enlargement of the intended Station at Londonderry; and for other Purposes.
- Citation: 11 & 12 Vict. c. lxxix

Dates
- Royal assent: 22 July 1848

Other legislation
- Repealed by: Londonderry and Enniskillen Railway Consolidation Act 1852

Status: Repealed

Text of statute as originally enacted

Londonderry and Enniskillen Railway Amendment Act 1850
- Act of Parliament
- Parliament of the United Kingdom
- Long title: An Act to enable the Londonderry and Enniskillen Railway Company to extend their Line of Railway from Strabane to Omagh; and to amend the Acts relating to the said Company.
- Citation: 13 & 14 Vict. c. xiv

Dates
- Royal assent: 31 May 1850

Other legislation
- Repealed by: Londonderry and Enniskillen Railway Consolidation Act 1852

Status: Repealed

Text of statute as originally enacted

Londonderry and Enniskillen Railway Consolidation Act 1852
- Act of Parliament
- Parliament of the United Kingdom
- Long title: An Act to consolidate and amend the Acts relating to the Londonderry and Enniskillen Railway Company, and to grant further Powers to the said Company for the Extension and Completion of the Railway, and for other Purposes.
- Citation: 15 & 16 Vict. c. xliv

Dates
- Royal assent: 28 May 1852

Text of statute as originally enacted

Londonderry and Enniskillen Railway Act 1854
- Act of Parliament
- Parliament of the United Kingdom
- Long title: An Act to enable the Londonderry and Enniskillen Railway Company to make a Branch Railway to Fintona, and to extend their Line at Londonderry; and for other Purposes.
- Citation: 17 & 18 Vict. c. cxxxv

Dates
- Royal assent: 3 July 1854

Text of statute as originally enacted

Londonderry and Enniskillen Railway Act 1856
- Act of Parliament
- Parliament of the United Kingdom
- Long title: An Act to enable the Londonderry and Enniskillen Railway Company to create Preference Shares with Priority of Dividend over all the existing Shares of the Company, and for other Purposes.
- Citation: 19 & 20 Vict. c. cxxiv

Dates
- Royal assent: 21 July 1856

Text of statute as originally enacted

The Londonderry and Enniskillen Railway was incorporated by the Londonderry and Enniskillen Railway Act 1845 (8 & 9 Vict. c. xcviii). Construction began at Derry and followed the west bank of the River Foyle southwards 12 miles (19 km) to Strabane, which was reached in 1847. The L&ER's terminus in Derry was Londonderry Foyle Road station on the west bank of the River Foyle.

The line reached its summit at Fintona, County Tyrone, in 1853. Its final extension was from Fintona Junction, descending southwestwards to its terminus at Enniskillen, reached in 1854. Fintona Junction was just north of the town of Fintona, leaving the short stretch from the Junction to the town as a small branch line.

In 1859 the Dundalk and Enniskillen Railway (D&ER) reached Enniskillen, connecting the D&ER with Dundalk on the Irish Sea. Omagh became a junction in September 1861 when the Portadown, Dungannon and Omagh Junction Railway reached it from the east. The Ulster Railway worked the PD&O, giving Omagh a link with Belfast.

In 1868 the Enniskillen and Bundoran Railway opened, linking the Atlantic Coast towns of Bundoran and Ballyshannon with the L&ER at Bundoran Junction.

== Operation and takeover ==
Londonderry and Enniskillen Railway Amalgamation Act 1883
- Act of Parliament
- Parliament of the United Kingdom
- Long title: An Act for amalgamating the Londonderry and Enniskillen Railway Company with the Great Northern Railway Company (Ireland).
- Citation: 46 & 47 Vict. c. cxxx

Dates
- Royal assent: 16 July 1883

In 1862 the D&ER renamed itself the Irish North Western Railway (INW). In 1876 the INW merged with the Northern Railway of Ireland and the Ulster Railway to form the Great Northern Railway (GNR). The L&ER's lease continued and the company remained separate until the GNR absorbed it under the Londonderry and Enniskillen Railway Amalgamation Act 1883 (46 & 47 Vict. c. cxxx).

In 1857 a cow strayed onto the line near Carrigans, County Donegal and was hit and killed by the mail train to Omagh. Afterwards the Board of Trade Inspector criticised the condition of the track, which had been laid only a decade earlier. In 1871 there were two accidents within seven months at Mountjoy Halt, County Tyrone. Both were attributed to the poor condition of the permanent way. A level crossing across Ballyfatton Road between Strabane and Sion Mills was the scene of two accidents. In 1876 the crossing-keeper's wife was killed by a mail train and in 1883 a train hit a horse and cart, killing the horse. After the second accident the Board of Trade ordered the railway to replace the crossing with a bridge.

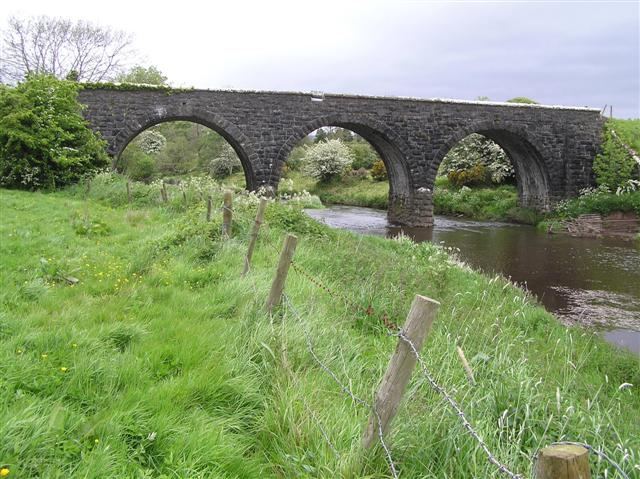
Disused bridge near Omagh over the Camowen River.

== After takeover ==
Under the Great Northern the former L&ER developed in three sections. The junction with the PD&O at Omagh made the Londonderry – Omagh line part of the GNR's "Derry Road" main line with services between Belfast Great Victoria Street and Derry Foyle Road via Portadown. The Belfast and Northern Counties Railway's competing route via Coleraine was shorter, quicker and attracted more passenger traffic, but the Derry Road carried more freight. Traffic grew to the extent that by 1907 the GNR had installed double track between Foyle Road and St. Johnston, but in 1932 it was singled again.

The Omagh – Enniskillen line via Fintona Junction became a secondary route, and in 1957 the Government of Northern Ireland closed it. The short branch to Fintona became famous as the GNR worked it with a horse tram. Since the line's closure, the tram has been preserved at the Ulster Folk and Transport Museum at Cultra, County Down.

In 1958 the governments of Northern Ireland and the Republic of Ireland partitioned the GNR between them and the Derry Road became part of the Ulster Transport Authority (UTA). The line was closed in February 1965.

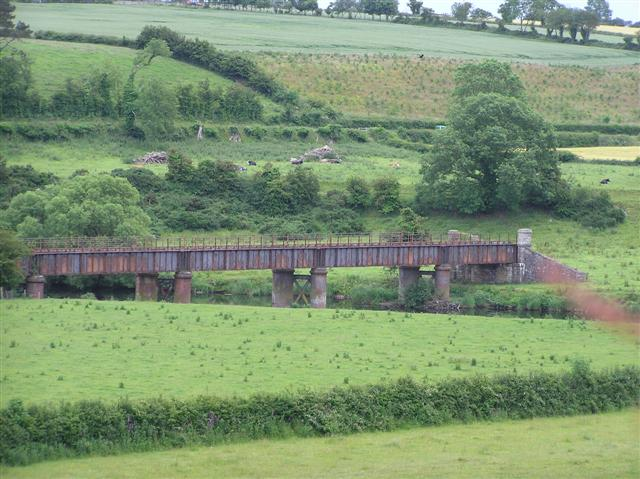
The former GNR mainline bridge over the River Mourne originally constructed on the Londonderry and Enniskillen Railway at Victoria Bridge, County Tyrone.

== Sources ==
- FitzGerald, J.D. (1995). The Derry Road. Colourpoint Transport. Vol. 2. Gortrush: Colourpoint Press. p. 1. ISBN 1-898392-09-9.
- Hajducki, S. Maxwell (1974). A Railway Atlas of Ireland. Newton Abbot: David & Charles. ISBN 0-7153-5167-2.
- Patterson, Edward M. (1962). The County Donegal Railways. Dawlish: David & Charles. pp. 10, 11.
