= Mun =

MUN may refer to:

== People ==
- Mun, another spelling of Moon (Korean name), Korean family and personal name
- Mun (surname)
- Ajahn Mun (1870–1949), Thai bhikkhu (Buddhist monk)

== Places ==
- Mun, Hautes-Pyrénées, a commune in the Hautes-Pyrénées, France
- Mun River, Thailand
- River Mun, Norfolk, England
- Ballymun (also known as 'The Mun') Dublin, Ireland

== Organisations ==
- Memorial University of Newfoundland
- Mineworkers Union of Namibia, a trade union
- Model United Nations
- National Unity Movement (Nicaragua) (Spanish: Movimiento de Unidad Nacional), a political party in Nicaragua
- Miss Universe Nepal, national beauty pageant in Nepal affiliated to Miss Universe

== Other uses ==
- Mun (album), album by Finnish musician Nopsajalka
- Mun (religion), a shamanistic religion of the Lepcha people
- Mün language, a language of Burma
- Mun (unit), a South Asian unit of mass
- Korean mun, a historical currency of Joseon Korea
- The type of players ("mundanes") in role-playing video games; see Mundane § In popular culture
- Tropical Storm Mun (2019)
- Manchester United F.C., an English football club
- The Mun (or Mün), a fictional moon in Kerbal Space Program and its sequel Kerbal Space Program 2
- Military Unit Number
- Ballymun, Dublin, Ireland
- Ballymun United FC, an Irish football club

== See also ==
- Moon (disambiguation)
