= Mun (surname) =

Mun is a surname of multiple origins.

Notable people with the surname include:

- Eric Mun (born 1979), South Korean rapper
- Nami Mun, Korean American writer
- Thomas Mun (1571–1641), English writer on economics
- Thomas Mun (MP) (1645-1692), English politician, MP

== See also ==
- Moon (Korean name), Korean family and given name
- Mun (disambiguation)
- Munn
- de Mun
