= Days Hotel =

Days Hotel may refer to:

- Days Inn, a hotel chain headquartered in the United States.
- Metro Hotel, a hotel in Dublin, Ireland
