= Amaptocare =

Tree planting project and public artwork in Ballymun, Ireland

amaptocare
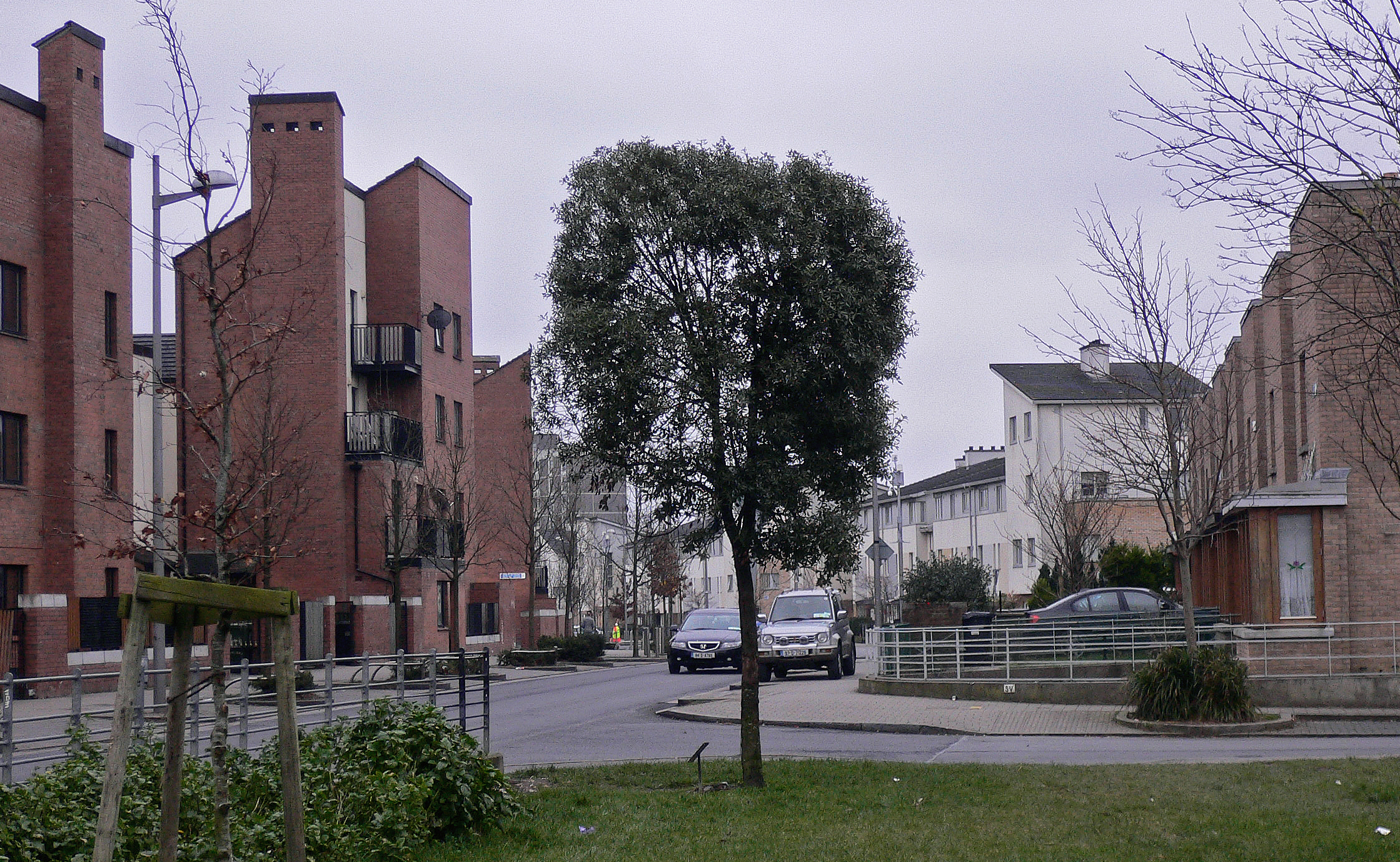
- An example amaptocare semi-mature tree, with its narrative lectern, in a regenerated Ballymun streetscape
- Artist: Jochen Gerz
- Completion date: 2017
- Medium: Trees
- Designation: Large-scale public art work
- Location: Ballymun, Dublin, Ireland
- Website: jochengerz.eu/works/amaptocare

amaptocare is a large-scale public art work, in the form of a participative sponsored tree-planting project in Ballymun on the Northside of Dublin, Ireland. Proposed by German conceptual artist Jochen Gerz and commissioned by Breaking Ground on behalf of Dublin City Council's Ballymun Regeneration Limited as a percent for art program. It involved planting semi-mature trees in each neighbourhood of Ballymun, each with a personal comment from its sponsor inscribed on a nearby metal and ceramic lectern. Over 630 trees from a choice of 15 mostly native varieties were sponsored, most by locals and other Dubliners, and 620 were planted by 2006.

amaptocare was the largest and longest-running of the arts projects funded as part of the massive regeneration of Ballymun, on which over 1.5 billion euro was spent. Begun in 2003, the project formally ended in 2017, but three elements at Ballymun's civic plaza remain to be completed, namely an illuminated map of the project, inscription of sponsor names, and the planting of the "first fifteen" sponsored trees, one of each variety. There was a wide welcome for the new trees, and arts critics commented on the positive engagement of the project, but there were also questions from some locals about the mandatory sponsorship element. Aside from amaptocare, Ballymun Regeneration also engaged in a general tree-planting project.

== Origins ==
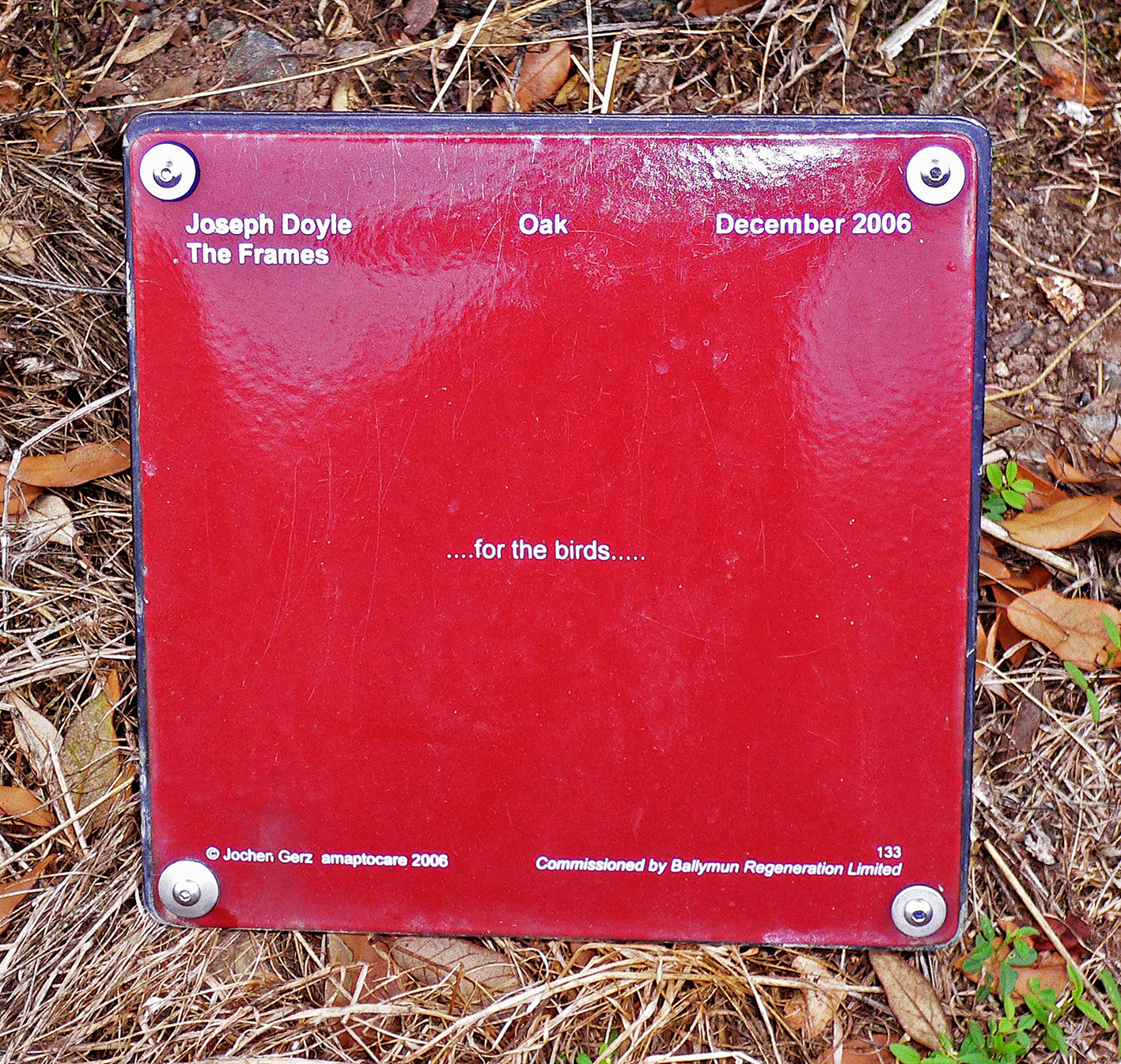
A brief inscription that reflects Jochen Gerz's original concept of addressing the issue of a "no-fly zone for birds". This was sponsored by Joe Doyle of The Frames.

As part of the Ballymun Regeneration, which had a planned public sector spend of hundreds of millions of euro and total plans exceeding 2.5 billion euro, a combined percent for art programme was deployed through the Breaking Ground arts organisation, established under the oversight of Dublin City Council's Ballymun Regeneration Limited. Breaking Ground sponsored a range of artworks, but also advertised by open call, in 2002, for a major project. Ultimately, two options were considered: a sculpture by American public artist Jeff Koons, whose works commanded high prices but some of which were seen as "draws" or tourist attractions, or a participatory public artwork by conceptual artist Jochen Gerz. Gerz, a German-born resident in Paris with dozens of completed public and participative art projects, visited Ballymun in 2002, and his first reaction had been a feeling that "this is a 'no-fly zone' for birds. It's very mineral, very planned, very geometrical."

After further reading in Irish mythology, in which he noted the prominence of trees and woods, Gerz put tree planting at the centre of his project proposal. He said that he saw trees to be separating the "public space of Ballymun" from the "civic space of Ballymun", which he feared would otherwise be streamlined and dull. He hoped to interrupt the "monotony of the computer drawings". The project fitted within Gerz's participative art, including his perception that active involvement in art is important to democracy and the sense of community, and that the role of an artist is not an isolated one.

The Gerz proposal was selected, and it proceeded as the largest and one of the two highest-funded Ballymun arts projects with a budget exceeding 250,000 euro (Note: The other leading Ballymun Regeneration Limited arts project was Hotel Ballymun, which some sources claim had a final cost exceeding 400,000 euro.) and a duration of 14 years from December 2003 to December 2017. While some arts-related construction projects have higher costs, Gerz's project has been described as Ireland's largest arts project. It was commissioned in late 2003 by Aisling Prior, the director of Breaking Ground, who also acted as producer, and was named amaptocare, derived from "a map to care". The project manager and producer was Sheena Barrett. The artist and his wife moved to Sneem, County Kerry to oversee amaptocare.

== Project ==
=== Promotion and tree types ===
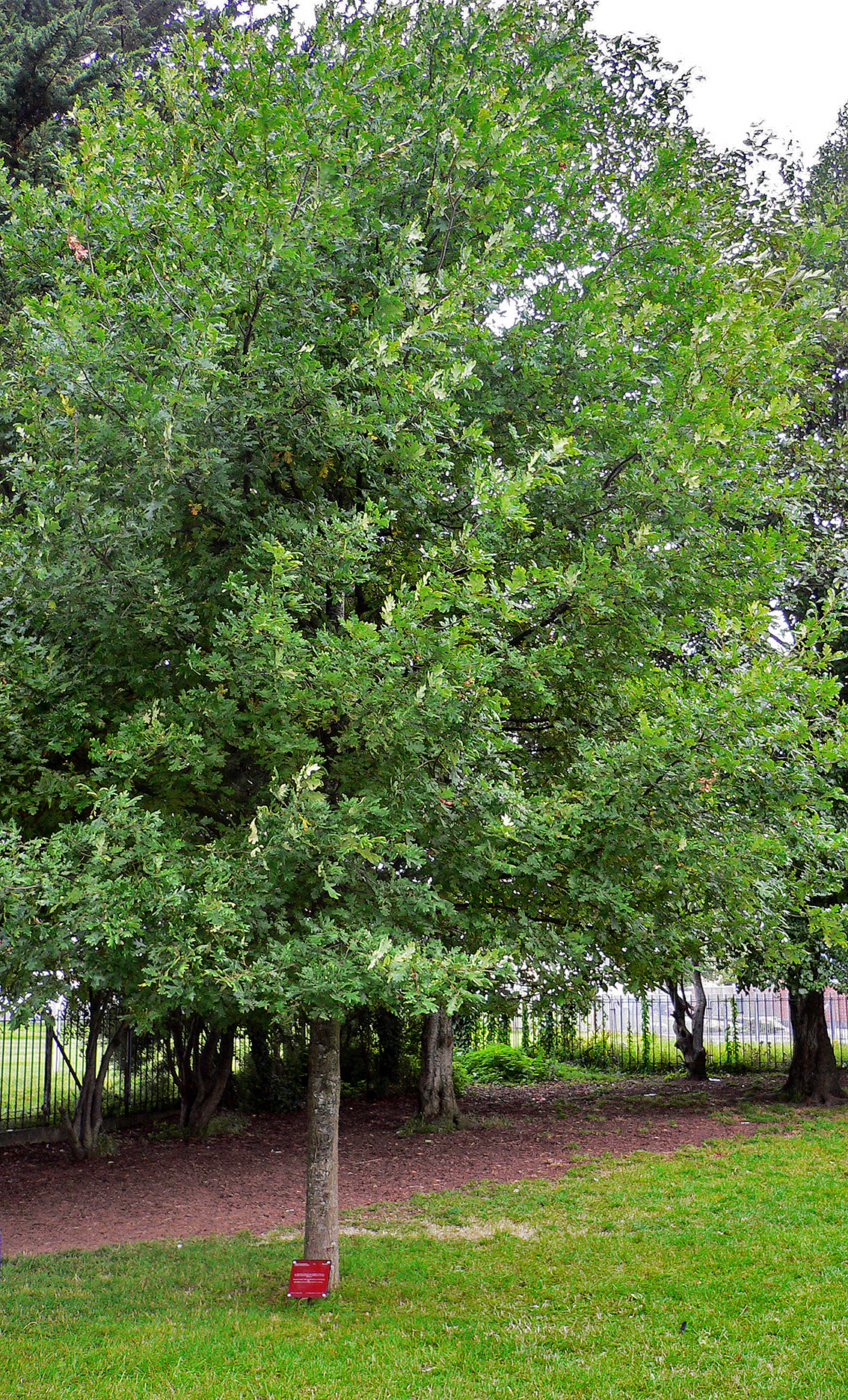
One of the most popular varieties among sponsors, the oak

Beginning in January 2004, the project was advertised locally, inviting people to sponsor a tree, individually or as a family or other group. Ballymun residents and former residents were the primary targets, but donations were also accepted from nonresidents. Most donations were by individual, but a few were declared for families, at least one for a community of nuns, and at least one for the band Aslan, whose members came from Ballymun and nearby Finglas, and who used to rehearse in a local parish hall, and one for Joe Doyle of The Frames.

Fifteen, mostly native, tree varieties were offered: pedunculate oak, wild cherry, white willow, ash, London plane, holm oak, beech, copper beech, birch, lime, maple, cedar, rowan, Scots pine, and Sophora japonica. Sponsorship donations ranged from 50 to 250 euros depending on the tree type, with the evergreen oak being the most expensive option. The idea was to plant semi-mature trees for a stronger impression and increased probability of survival. The sponsorship amount was about half the cost of sourcing and planting each tree, after discounted supply by the State forestry company, Coillte. The other half was covered by the scheme's promoters. The project's sponsorship-participative nature was viewed as a catalyst for enhanced local environmental stewardship, with the expectation that numerous individual investments would foster a lasting commitment.

=== Operations ===
The project had offices in the Axis Arts and Community Centre in the civic complex in central Ballymun. It had a staff, aside from the artist, of two full-time and several part-time employees and support from Ballymun Regeneration and its arts advisors. Students from the National College of Art and Design and Dún Laoghaire Institute of Art, Design and Technology interned on the project.

=== Phase 1 (Trees) ===
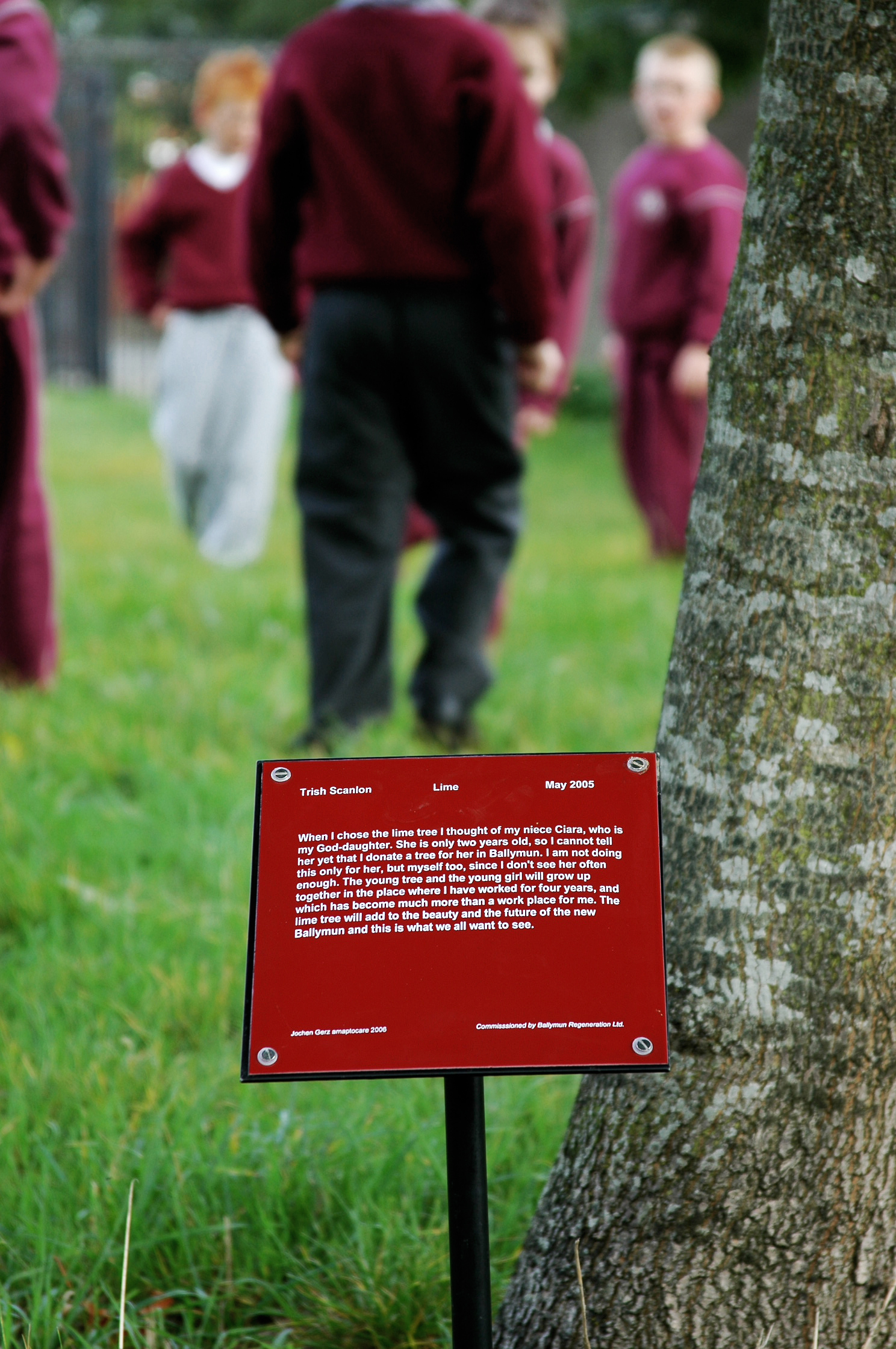
One of the semi-mature sponsored trees with its narrative plaque

In the first phase of the project, with a target of 625 donors, approximately 635 trees (Note: Sources cite between 625 and 637 trees; while 625 was the original plan, the artist's website lists 635 and the State's Public Art site records 637. This suggests that pledges exceeding the initial target were accepted and fulfilled, with at least six donors sponsoring two trees each, one sponsoring three, one pair sponsoring four, and one of those donors contributing a fifth.) were sponsored. While oak and wild cherry were the most popular choices, selections included a few of the more expensive options such as evergreen oak, maple, cedar, and pine. Sponsors contributed a total of approximately 45,000 euro. Some corporate sponsors donated trees on behalf of community organisations and the local comprehensive school, Trinity Comprehensive School. Each sponsor was invited, over a period of 18 months, to a face-to-face meeting with the artist. At these meetings, Gerz explored the concept of the project and worked with the sponsor to develops a short text answering the question, "If this tree could speak, what would it say for me?", to be printed on an enamelled plaque or lectern planted alongside their chosen tree. Donors were also asked to choose in which neighbourhood of Ballymun the tree should be planted. The project reported that the choice of locations proved challenging, due to both the massive demolition and construction work across Ballymun, and to other, more routine, tree planting work.

620 trees were planted on a wide range of streets between 2004 and 2006 by Coillte, Ballymun Regeneration and the city council. Each plaque were installed adjacent to each tree, 32 cm from the ground. In the event of vandalism, of which there was a small initial wave, the lecterns were quickly replaced to maintain continuity, which the project believed led to an abatement in vandalism. As of 2017, the first 15 trees sponsored had not yet been planted, as they were to be specially sited around the illuminated map of the whole project at Ballymun's civic plaza.

=== Phase 2 (Civic Plaza) ===
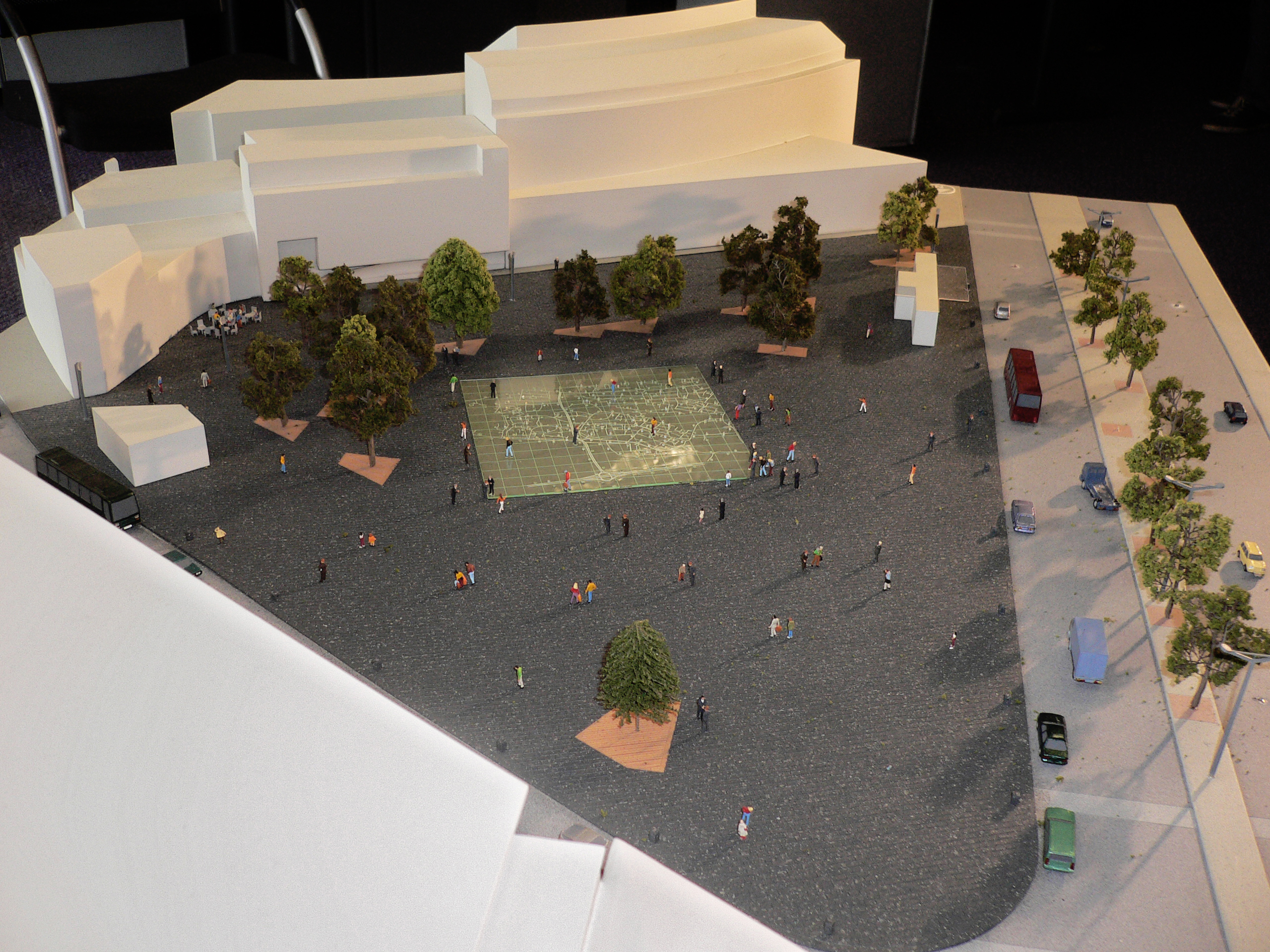
A scale model of the Ballymun Civic Plaza with a map of the amaptocare, donor names, and one tree of each of the 15 varieties

The second phase of the project was the sandblasting of the names of the donors into the granite surface of Ballymun's Civic Plaza and the installation of a 24 metre by 24 metre panel map of the area with the site of each tree illuminated. The "first 15" trees sponsored, one of each offered variety, were planned to be planted around the map. The illuminated map was to be produced by Laurent Fachard, founder of Lyon's lighting specialist LEA studio.

By 2008, it was reported that the second phase was delayed by discussions about Dublin's potential MetroLink to Dublin Airport stop, which was planned to be located at the former site of the Ballymun Shopping Centre. Residents and donors complained about a lack of information on the subject and project progress since the main tree-planting. Ballymun Regeneration promised to hold meetings on updated plans in the near term. By 2010, Gerz expected to conclude the project by 2015, but as of 2017, the names on the plaza and the map were still pending. The artist remarked that the amaptocare project remains unfinished, noting his heitation from declaring it abandoned. He stated that he was optimistic that the full project would be eventually fulfilled.

== The National Memory Grove ==
A community tree-planting project was proposed by locals, to be coordinated by Jochen Gerz and his team, as a memorial to the Ballymun Tower blocks. To be named the National Memory Grove, this would have been a densely-planted hectare of oak trees. Land was allocated by Dublin Corporation on the road from central Ballymun towards Dublin Airport. The first 40 sponsors were secured, but the project did not get the green light.

== Reception ==
While reporting that the project was fully subscribed and describing the artist as an "impressive figure" and "tireless negotiator", The Irish Times reported in late 2004 that there was some adverse comments about aspects of amaptocare. Several questioned the requirement to donate, but the artist explained that he sought a sense of ownership rather than impersonal municipal planting. He noted, "it could be possible that a work of art would not suffer from the presence of the people but, on the contrary, it would get better with the presence of the people". He described the project as "a little practical study of democracy." A research project by Peter Dowie on arts projects and the Ballymun schemes also picked up some negative commentary about amaptocare, even "community animosity", with one community development worker at the Ballymun Partnership describing it as arrogant, extremely ambitious, impractical, and "very expensive with no room for evaluation". An artistic director and activist referred to a perception of patronisation. Dowie summarized local reactions as reflecting a renewed commitment to caring for the community. He noted that any resentment toward the project stemmed from the perception that it misunderstood the care already shown over thirty years of municipal neglect. Residents viewed the payment requirement as a form of civic disrespect, particularly given that it was imposed on an area with high social welfare dependency while wealthier neighborhoods received fully funded programs, although a fully municipally-funded tree planting programme was also carried out in parallel during the area's regeneration.

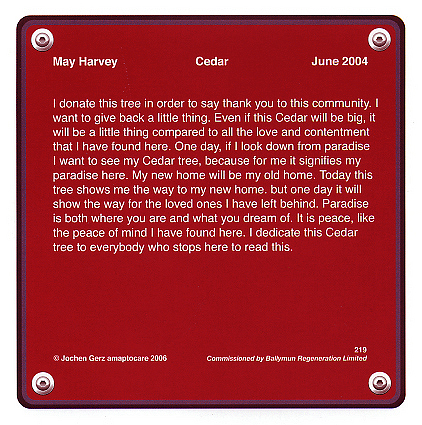
An example of an inscription that serves as a personal expression about a sponsored tree.

Artists and art critics praised the participative and expressive nature of the work. Art critic Jeremy Hunt said, "Gerz has inversed the idea of imposed 'gifts' of social housing, institutional urbanism and cultural artefacts [...] invited the population of Ballymun to donate, to contribute by paying for their own environment." Marion Hohlfeldt remarked that Gerz was giving residents of an area, which had been the focus of a "bad news" approach, the opportunity to narrate their own history and be the "new elites". He also stated that the project was multi-layered and had changed the atmosphere within the district during regeneration. John Duffy, a local artist involved in the project, described it as "providing a space for the donor, offering a way in which they can make a mark for themselves". He highlighted one sponsor's perspective by stating, "the provision of a second chance for her life in Ballymun. With the physical and emotional changes that are happening to her life, she can mark them with her words on the lectern for her tree", and emphasizing "power of the project in the texts and the [...] individuals and groups involved in the articulation of those words". In the 2018 TV3 documentary The 4th Act, the documentary's producer Andrew Keogh considered the art projects to be "artists [trying] to get a piece of the action". He also stated that amaptocare was in "different states of disrepair".

== See also ==
- List of public art in Dublin
