= Aoife Dooley =

Irish writer, illustrator, designer and comedian

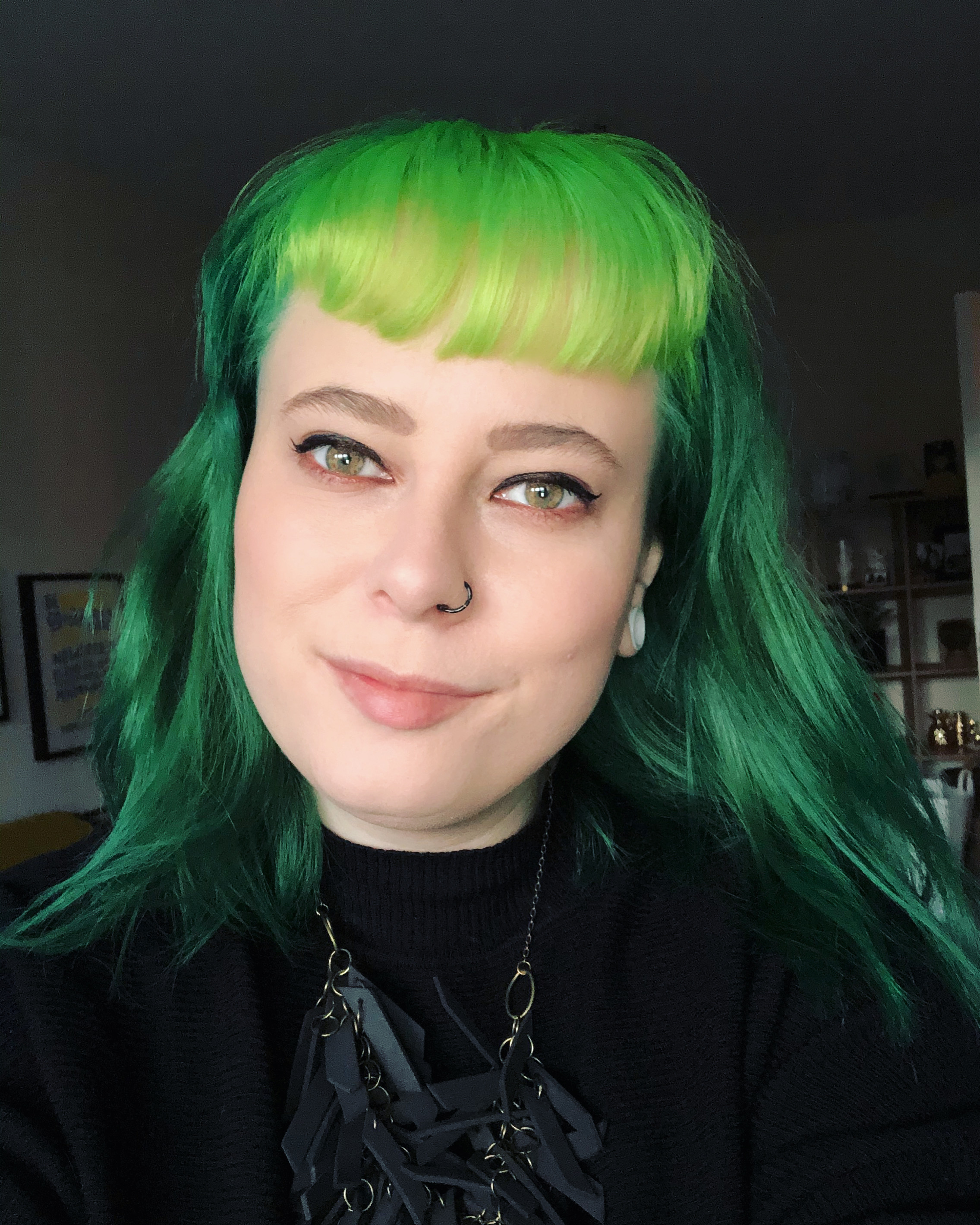
- Dooley in 2019
- Born: 14 April 1991 (age 34); Coolock, Dublin, Ireland
- Occupations: Illustrator, author, comedian and public speaker
- Website: http://aoifedooleydesign.com/

Aoife Dooley (born 14 April 1991), is an Irish writer, illustrator, comedian and graphic designer.

== Life ==
A North Dubliner, Dooley has lived in Ballymun and Coolock for most of her life. Her father left when she was young and her mother remarried. She has a younger sister. Dooley's mother died when she was twenty two and although she did regain a relationship with her father, he died in 2017. Dooley was diagnosed as autistic in 2018 which she has credited with allowing her to feel more like herself and then include the awareness and acceptance into her work.

She studied in Dublin Institute of Technology, she also studied graphic design in Colaiste Dhulaigh. Her books and illustrations are based on everyday observations of life in Dublin. Her illustrations (which are based on her books) have been turned into an animated TV series for RTÉ starring Al Foran, Emmet Kirwan, Jen Hatton and Enya Martin. Dooley also performs live and has appeared at Electric Picnic and Vodafone Comedy Festival. For only her second gig she was performing on PJ Gallagher's tour. She won U Magazine's 30 under 30 award for best comedian in 2017. Her first book for children won The Specsavers Children's Book of the Year. Dooley was also selected for the game changers award at the Irish Tatler women of the year awards.

Dooley speaks publicly covering a number of topics including on creativity. She has been a guest speaker on OFFSET in 2016 and 2018 in the Bord Gáis Energy Theatre. Dooley also creates prints, jewelry and badges which she sells online.

== Irish exam ==
In 2019, Dooley's work was used as the basis for a question in the Irish Junior Cert English exam. Afterwards Dooley came under attack online as a result and was subjected to abuse and threats.

== Selected works ==
- How to Be Massive (2016)
- How to Deal with Poxes on a Daily Basis (2017)
- 123 Ireland! (2019)
- Frankie's World (2022)
- ABC Ireland! (2022)
