= Better Ballymun Day =

Social event in Ballymun, Ireland

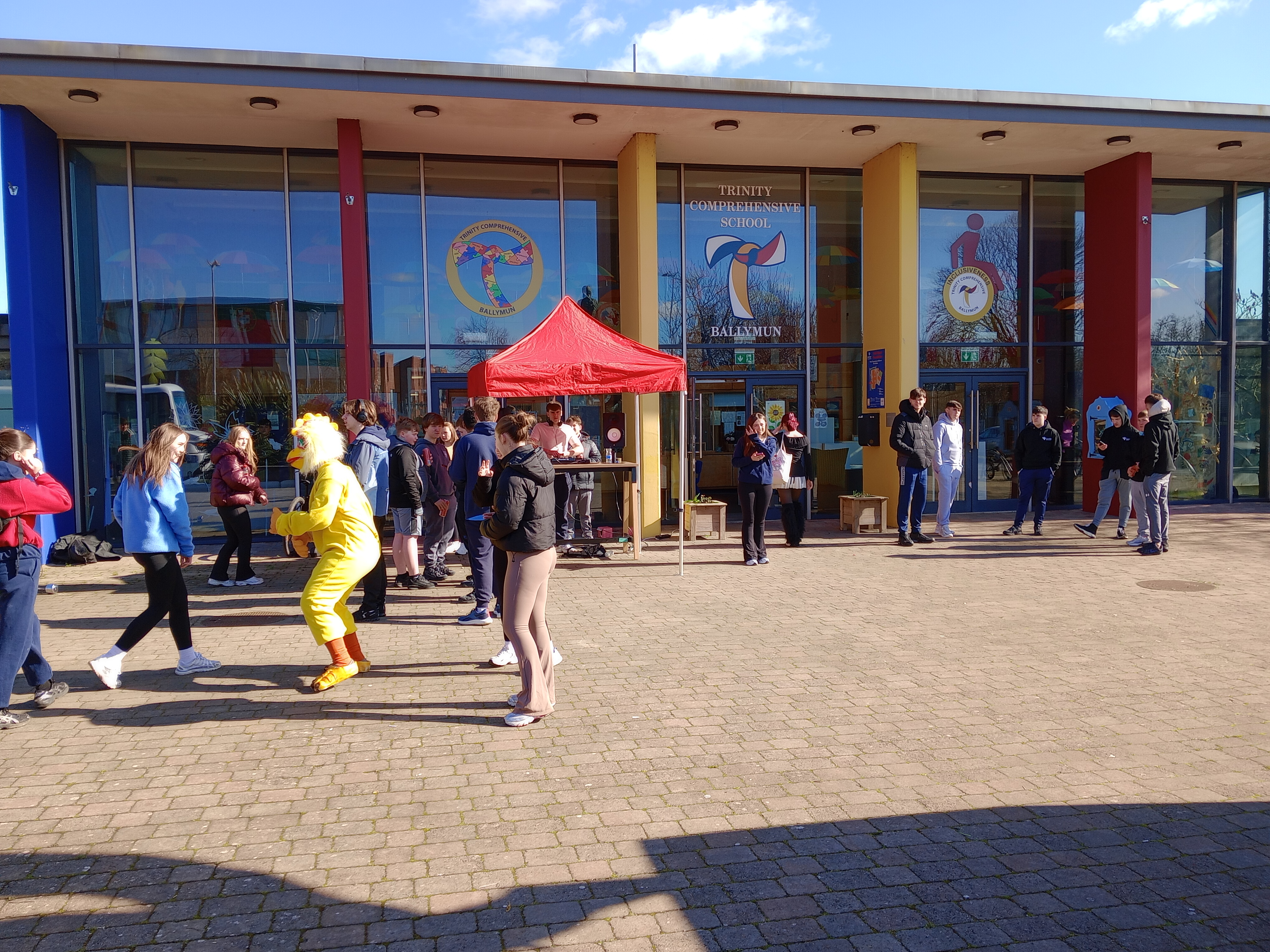
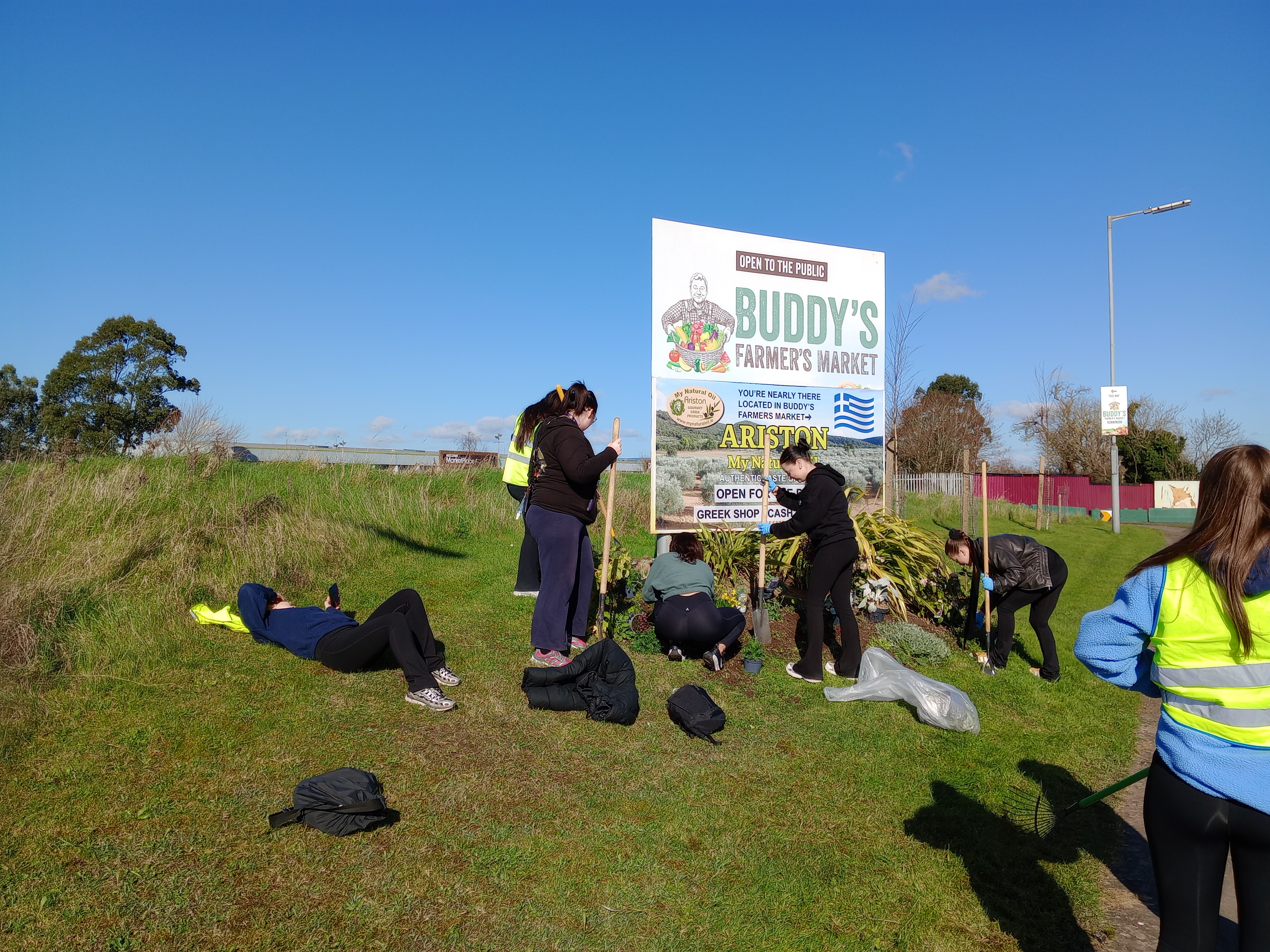
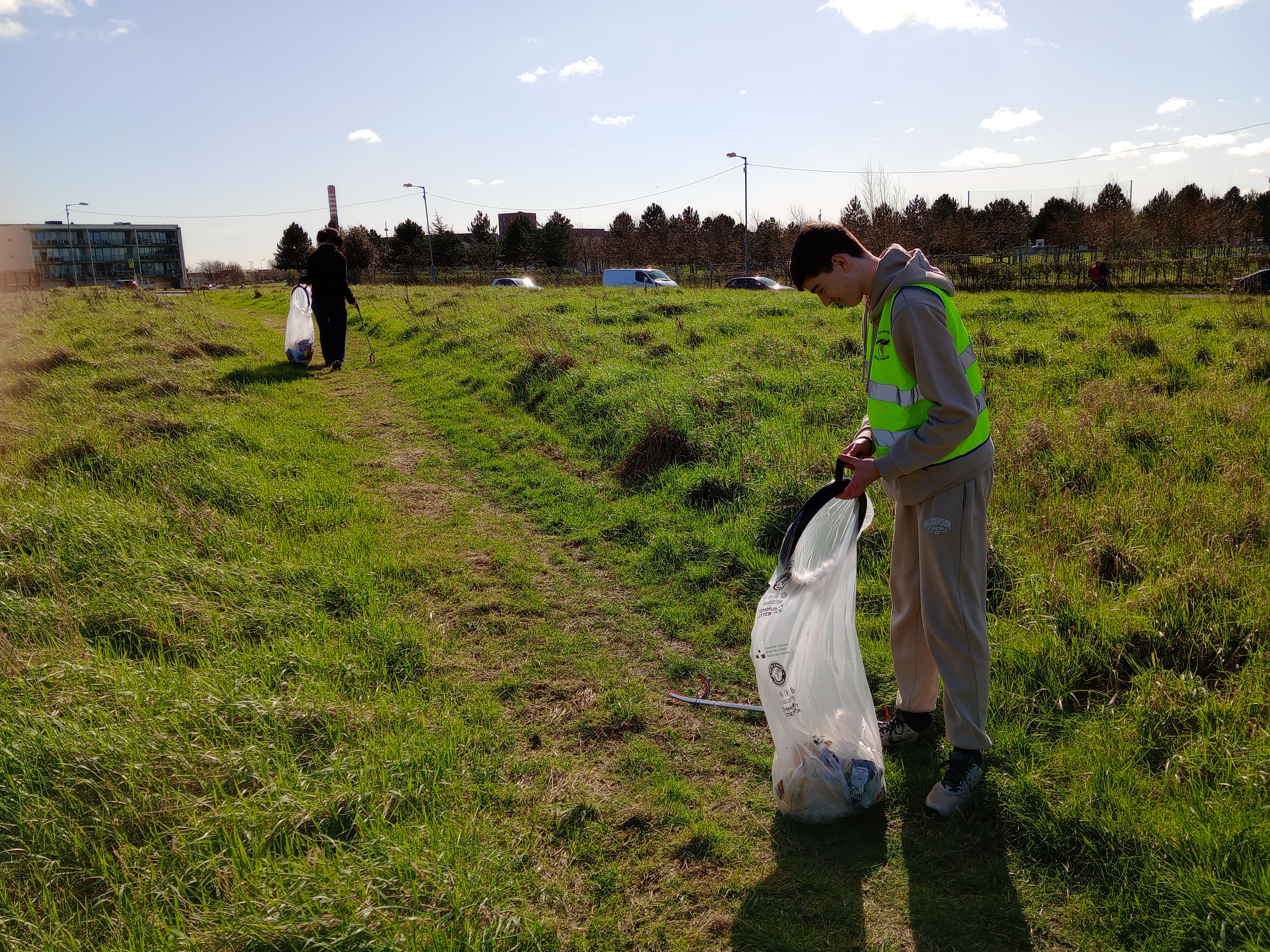
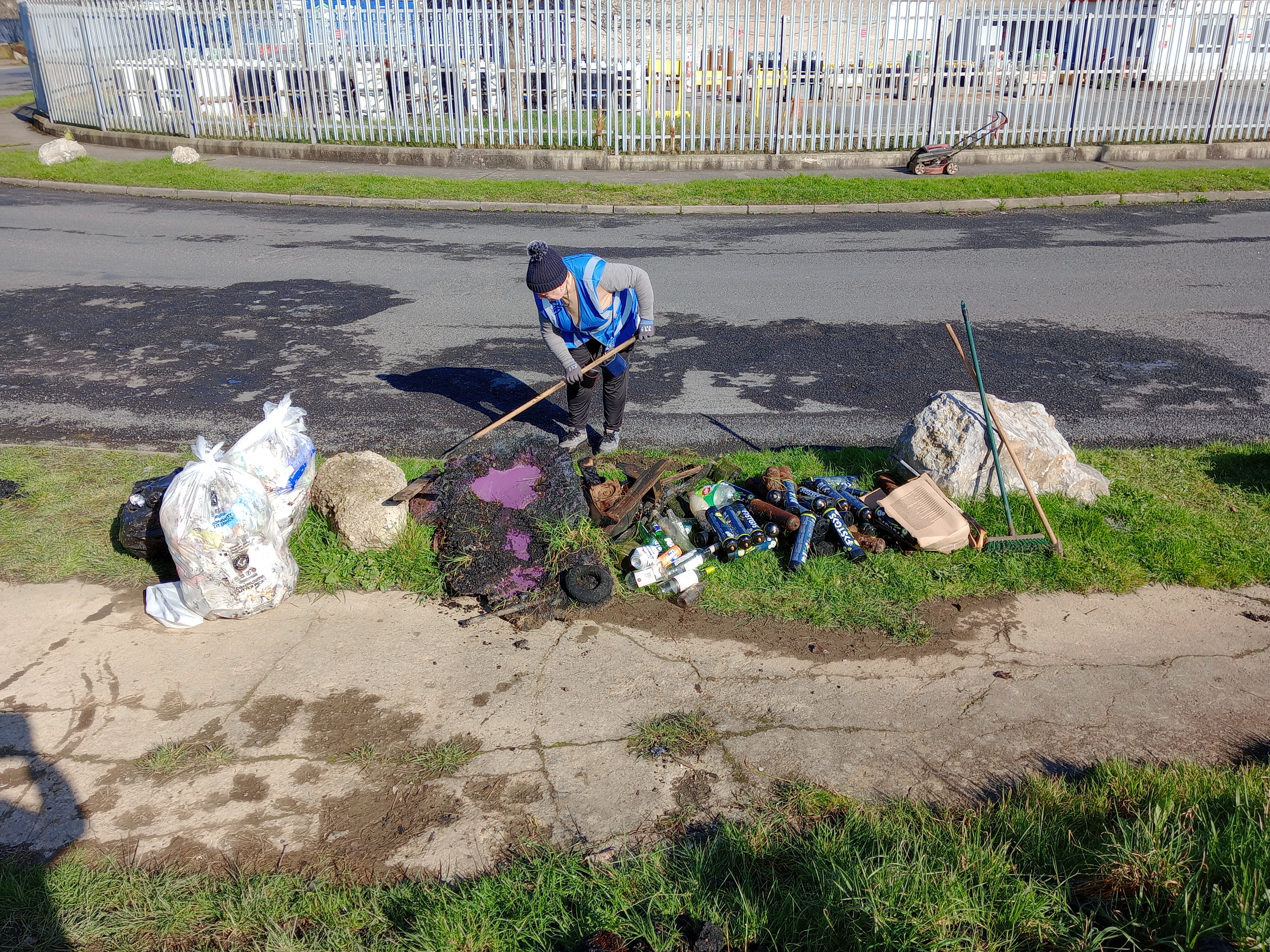
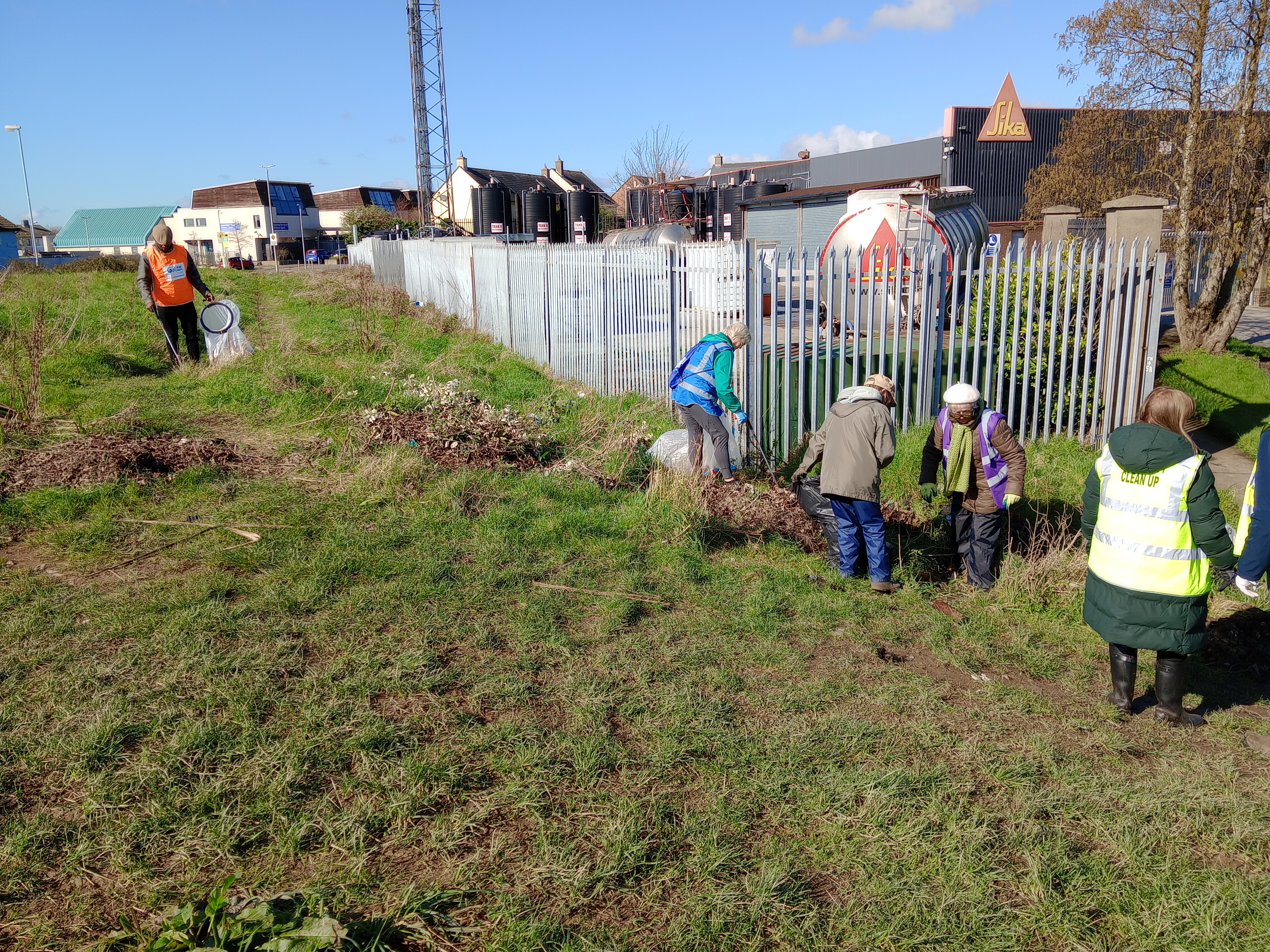
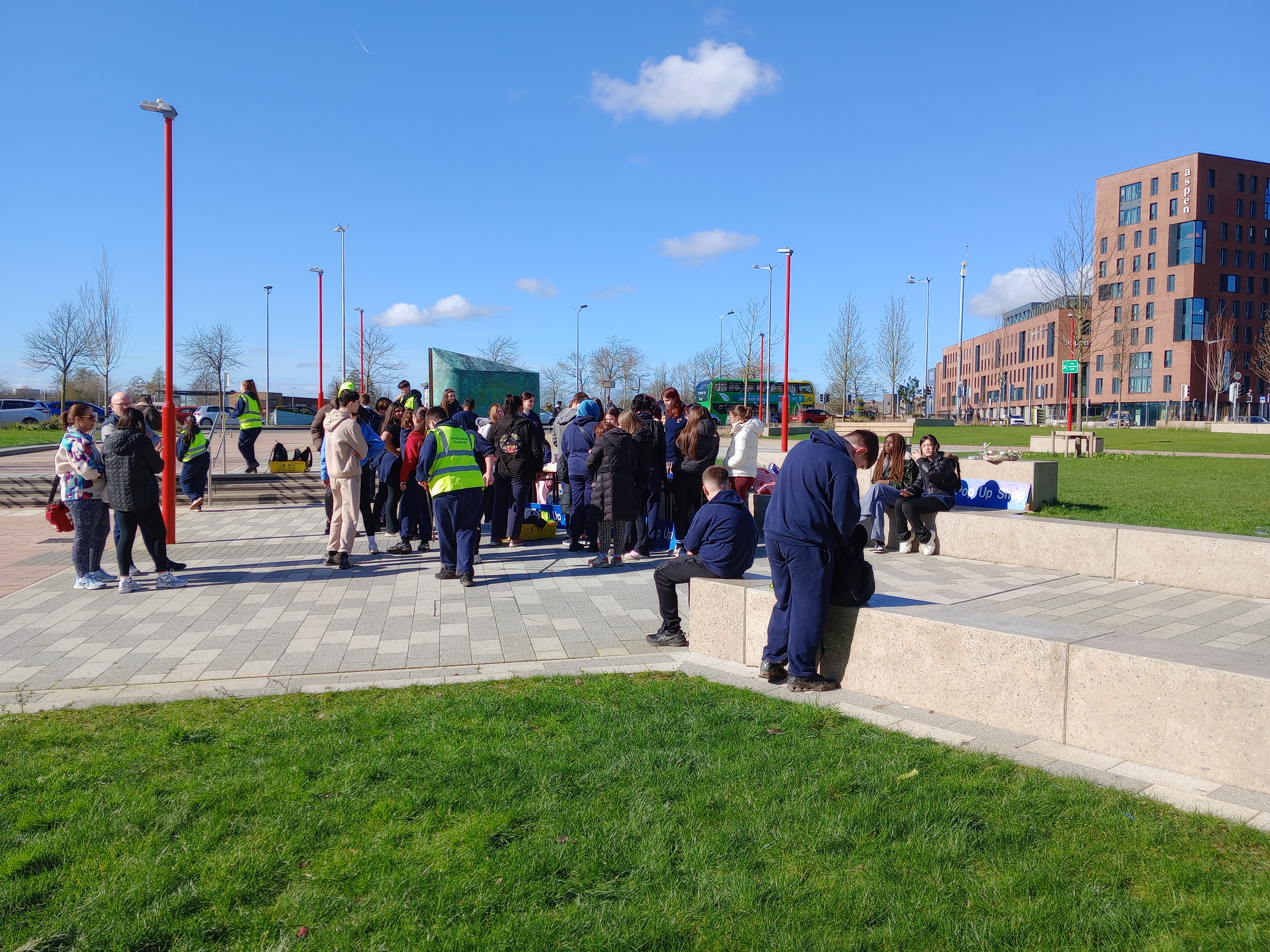
- From top to bottom, left to right: Trinity Comprehensive School on Better Ballymun Day 2026, gardening near Musgrave MarketPlace, litter picking in North Ballymun, removing gas canisters, litter picking beside a Sika building, Ballymunners at a food stand at the Seven Heroes Square
- Official name: Better Ballymun Day
- Also called: Better Ballymun Day of Action
- Observed by: Ballymunners
- 2025 date: 14 March
- 2026 date: 6 March
- Frequency: Annual
- First time: 28 February 2020
- Started by: Trinity Comprehensive School

Better Ballymun Day, also known as Better Ballymun Day of Action, is an annual social event in Ballymun, Dublin, Ireland. The event has been held annually since February 2020, is led by students from the local secondary school, Trinity Comprehensive, and aims to make Ballymun a better place to live. The event is also supported by Dublin City Council, the Ballymun Tidy Towns group, and several local clubs and businesses.

== History ==
In 2019, Ballymun placed 40th out of 40 towns and cities surveyed in round 1 of An Taisce's Anti-Litter League, causing a stir locally. Following this, Ballymun Tidy Towns said that Ballymun needed to "band together in order to tackle dumping and littering in the area" on Facebook. This caused people in Ballymun to engage more in that year's World Cleanup Day, leading to Ballymun moving up to 38th place in round 2 of An Taisce's Anti-Litter League, going from "Litter Blackspot" to "Littered". An Taisce considered this a "much improved result". This inspired students at Trinity Comprehensive to approach Dublin City Council and Ballymun Tidy Towns in January 2020 about launching a "Ballymun Day of Action".

The first Better Ballymun Day was held on 28 February 2020. Over 750 people, mainly students, teachers and SNAs participated in planting, painting and litter-picking 36 sites across the suburb. The project was nominated for the IPB Pride of Place Awards 2020 but didn't win. There was no designated Better Ballymun Day in 2021, but projects relating to it continued throughout 2020 and 2021.

The second Better Ballymun Day was held on 3 March 2022 and had over 3,000 participants. The day was launched and attended by the president of Ireland, Michael D. Higgins. As part of it, a community book exchange was started, the rear grounds of Trinity Comprehensive were turned into a garden, and a beehive and chicken coop were constructed in the school.

The third Better Ballymun Day was held on 3 March 2023, coinciding with World Wildlife Day and had over 2,000 participants aiding with over 60 projects. The event was launched by former Lord Mayor of Dublin, Caroline Conroy, a past pupil of Trinity Comprehensive. The event was also attended by former Social Democrats leader Róisín Shortall. As part of it, several trees were planted in nearby sports grounds, swift boxes were installed, a clay oven was constructed and several murals were also updated. In An Taisce's 2023 Anti-Litter League survey, where Ballymun placed 30th out of 40 towns and cities surveyed and being considered "Moderately Littered", An Taisce noted that several community initiatives including Better Ballymun Day aided Ballymun's strong performance that year, with notable improvements in areas that were heavily littered in previous years' surveys. The fourth Better Ballymun Day was held on March 15, 2024. Later that year in May, Trinity Comprehensive School won the AIB Future Sparks School Impact Awards 2024 for Better Ballymun Day.

The fifth Better Ballymun Day was held on 14 March 2025. The sixth Better Ballymun Day was held on 6 March 2025, as part of the UN Year of the Volunteer.

The ongoing work of Better Ballymun Day are supported by Dublin City Council, which provides materials and waste removal, the Ballymun Tidy Towns group, and several local clubs and businesses.

== See also ==
- Arbor Day
- Clean-up (environment)
- Let's Do It 2008
- Let's Clean Slovenia in One Day!
- Let's Clean Slovenia 2012
- Earth Day
- National Cleanup Day
- The Ocean Cleanup
