= Metro Hotel =

Tall hotel in Dublin

Metro Hotel Dublin Airport
- Metro Hotel logo

- The Metro Hotel in 2026

- Location in Dublin

General information
- Location: Santry Cross, Ballymun Road, Ballymun, Dublin 9, Ireland
- Coordinates: 53.4009714°N 6.2641483°W
- Year built: 2005

Height
- Height: 52 metres (171 ft)

Technical details
- Floor count: 16

Website
- www.metrohoteldublinairport.com

The Metro Hotel Dublin Airport, or just the Metro Hotel, is a hotel on the Northside of Dublin, Ireland. It was built in 2005 during the Regeneration of Ballymun, and was originally known as the Days Hotel Dublin Airport, or just the Days Hotel. It has 16 storeys and is 52 metres high, making it Dublin's 6th tallest building. It caught fire on 21 March 2018, starting on the thirteenth floor and spread to the tenth, without damaging the floors between. The 150 people in it at the time were almost immediately evacuated with no casualties. The Dublin Fire Brigade speculate that debris falling from the thirteenth floor may have spread to the tenth because of a safety feature which caused all windows to open. After the fire, it was temporarily closed, but was later refurbished and reopened to the public. A shuttle bus runs between it and Dublin Airport.

== History ==
The Days Hotel under construction

The Metro Hotel was built in 2005 during the Regeneration of Ballymun, originally known as the Days Hotel. It has 16 storeys and is 52 metres high, making it Dublin's 6th tallest building.

In 2007 a charter plane with 118 passengers and crew narrowly avoided crashing into the hotel after its pilot mistook the red lighting on the hotel's roof combined with its white internal light for the approach lights of a Dublin Airport runway. The incident occurred at 11.34 pm on the night of 16 August 2007, when the McDonnell Douglas jet was carrying 112 passengers and six crew on a charter flight from Lisbon to Dublin.

In April 2014, the 88-bedroom Metro Hotel was put on the market in the region of €2.5 million. Along with the hotel, the sellers sought €3 million for the 30 two-bed apartments on the upper floors of the property. In July 2016, planning permission was refused for the retention of masts and antennae on the hotel.

=== Fire ===
On the night of 21 March 2018, at about 7:30pm, a multistory structure fire broke out in the hotel's top floors. It started on the thirteenth floor and spread to the tenth, without damaging the floors between. The Dublin Fire Brigade (DFB) was then alerted about the fire at around 8:00pm, and atleast twelve units of the Dublin Fire Brigade and atleast sixty firefighters arrived to deal with it. Ambulances and An Garda Shiochana also arrived. The ladders that the firefighters had were too small to be able to reach the top floors of the hotel.

All 150 people were almost immediately evacuated, and the surrounding area and section of Ballymun Road was sealed off. A Garda helicopter was also seen flying over the hotel. At 10:45pm, the DFB tweeted "It is important for us to give out correct and factual information. As of yet we have no reports of any casualties or people unaccounted for."

Families affected by the fire were rehoused in emergency accommodation paid for by the hotel, with some going to the homeless central placement centre at Parkgate Hall, Dublin. The hotel paid €2,000 to those who lost their belongings, and €1,000 to those who retrieved their belongings. The families were also given a Housing Assistance Payment from Dublin City Council (DCC). The Dublin Regional Homeless Executive said that there were no homeless families in the building when it caught fire.

Eyewitnesses and the DFB speculated that it may have been caused by one of the hotel's safety features, where the windows open whenever the fire alarm goes off, allowing debris to fall from the 13th to the 10th, spreading it there. Chief of the DFB Pat Fleming, and firefighter and SIPTU committee chair Deirde Taylor both noted that it spreading downward was unusual, as most fire spreads upwards.

Firefighter Shane McGill, speaking to The Herald, said that if the fire started at 3am, people would have died in it. Anthony Flynn, co-founder of the Inner City Helping Homeless, compared the fire to the Grenfell Tower fire that happened the previous year in London. Fianna Fáil politician Paul McAuliffe said that the fire would "leave a major scar on the landscape of Ballymun". Several politicians including tánaiste (Irish deputy head of government) Simon Coveney, Fianna Fáil politician Darragh O'Brien, Sinn Féin politician Eoin Ó Broin, Fine Gael politician, who is a Teachta Dála (TD) for Dublin North-West, Noel Rock, and Labour Party politician Brendan Howlin, all praised the first responders response to the fire.

=== Post Fire ===
After the fire, the building temporarily closed. In a Dáil Éireann debate the day after, politician Thomas P. Broughan brought up the fire, starting a small discussion about it in the Dáil. Braughan praised the response from first responders, and said it raised concerns about the safety of other buildings made during the Celtic Tiger (a term referring to the economy of Ireland from the mid-1990s to the end of the first decade of the 21st century, a period of rapid real economic growth fuelled by foreign direct investment). He also criticized self-certification which was allowed under the Building Control Act 1990, an act inspired by Irish former politician Pádraig Flynn. Coveney responded by saying that a report and audit of local authority multi-storey buildings which would be confirmed by the Minister for Housing, Planning and Local Government was underway because of the Grenfell Tower fire In April, independent councillor Noeleen Reilly called for DCC to carry out a risk assessment of Dublin, as the last update to DCC's Area Risk Categorisation Report was in 2014. After the closure, the building was refurbished, and reopened to the public. A shuttle bus runs from 4am to midnight, running between Dublin Airport and the hotel.
