= The 4th Act =

Documentary film about Ballymun

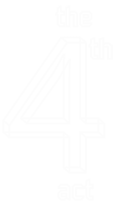
- The 4th Act logo
- Directed by: Turlough Kelly
- Produced by: Andrew Keogh
- Cinematography: John Breslin
- Edited by: Turlough Kelly & Andrew Keogh
- Music by: Christopher "GI" Buckley
- Production companies: Bread & Circus
- Distributed by: Wildcard
- Release date: 2017
- Running time: 75 minutes
- Country: Ireland
- Language: English

The 4th Act is a 2017 Irish documentary film about the suburb of Ballymun in the Northside of Dublin, Ireland. The film was directed by Turlough Kelly, who grew up in Ballymun.

== Plot ==
The 4th Act tells the story of the Ballymun Regeneration from the point of view of local residents. The film consists of archival footage collected from locals by the Ballymun Media Co-op(now Ballymun Communications).

The film ends with the story of the last person still living in the Ballymun Flats who refused to leave.

== Production ==
The film was originally planned to be a series of short films about the Joseph Plunkett Tower, the last of the Ballymun Flats to be demolished. The crew behind the film came to the conclusion that if they wanted "to do any justice to the topic it needed to be a documentary". The documentary took 3 years to make. Many of the crew who worked on the film previously worked at Dublin Community Television.

The documentary was funded by the Irish Film Board, Dublin City Council and the Broadcasting Authority of Ireland.

== Release ==
The film was first screened at the Dublin International Film Festival in 2017. The documentary was subsequently broadcast on national network TV3 on Good Friday 2018.

In 2025 the film was included as part of Ballymun Community Films, a collaboration between the Irish Film Institute, the Irish Film Archive and Ballymun Communications.

== Reception ==
The Sunday Times film critic Liam Fay described The 4th Act as "a vivid and eye-opening documentary about the fallout from decades of mishandled regeneration plans in the north Dublin suburb of Ballymun. The director Turlough Kelly’s deft blending of these archive clips with newly shot material gave the production an air of immediacy, with the people of Ballymun commenting on the tale as it unfolded on screen". Laura Larkin writing for the Irish Independent described the film as "an important documentary", which "shines a much needed spotlight on the disgraceful way the working class in this country has been demonised".
