= Ballymun United F.C. =

Irish football club

Coordinates: 53.406933°N 6.280100°W

Ballymun United
- Full name: Ballymun United Football Club
- Nickname: The Mun
- Founded: 1969
- Ground: Ballymun United Soccer Complex
- League: Leinster Senior League

Ballymun United FC, also known as The Mun, is an amateur association football club in Ballymun, Ireland. It plays in the Leinster Senior League Senior Division of the Leinster Senior League and the Dublin and District Schoolboys'/Girls' League. The club's clubhouse is beside Poppintree's IKEA. Ballymun United is rivals with Swords Celtic FC. The club's motto is "Ballymun and Proud".

== History ==
Ballymun United was founded in 1969, originally playing in the Sunday Section of the Leinster Junior Cup and Division 2 of the Athletic Union League.

In October 1990, the club won the Leinster Junior Cup title after beating Dromin United FC 4-0 at Balbutcher Lane, Poppintree.

Ballymun United played their first FAI Junior Cup final in May 1999, losing to Fairview Rangers A.F.C.. Two years later, in January 2001, the club won the FAI Junior Cup for the first time, beating St Kevin's Boys F.C. 3-0 at Tolka Park. Later that year in May, Ballymun United won the Leinster Football Association Junior Cup, beating Kildare Town A.F.C. 3-1 at Newbridge, County Kildare.

In August 2003, the club was gifted a €2,000 grant by the Irish Youth Foundation as part of their Children's Hour campaign.

In 2005, Ballymun United was removed from the FAI Junior Cup after Football Association of Ireland considered Stephen Hanna to be a "bonafide player for Ballymun United", when he had not requested international clearance to return to the Football Association of Ireland's jurisdiction. Ballymun United appealed this decision, insisting that "the documented evidence is available with the club for anyone who wishes to inspect it", which was denied by the Football Association of Ireland's Appeal Committee. Following the unsuccessful appeal, Ballymun United decided to withdraw from the competition.

In October 2016, Ballymun United joined Celtic F.C.'s International Club Partnership Programme.

== Facilities ==
In 2010, Ballymun United moved to their current facility next to Poppintree IKEA on St. Margaret's Road, Ballymun.

In June 2017, the club held fundraisers to raise enough money to build a second floor for their facility. The following year, they opened a bar there to celebrate their 50th anniversary.

In June 2025, the club was prevented from building more pitches due to a rare Tassel Stonewort (Tolypella intricata) plant that was growing on the lands they were trying to lease from Dublin City Council.

== Honours ==
- FAI Junior Cup (2): 2001, 2009
