= De Mun =

de Mun is a French surname associated with the noble de Mun family.

Notable people with the surname include:

- Adrien Albert Marie de Mun (1841–1914), French politician, nobleman, journalist, social reformer, and reactionary
- Bertrand de Mun (1870–1963), French businessman and politician
- Claude-Adrien de Mun (1773–1843), French politician
- Jules de Mun (1782–1843), French-American fur trader

== See also ==
- DeMun
