= Ballymun =

Northside suburb of Dublin, Ireland

Ballymun Baile Munna (Irish)
- Suburb
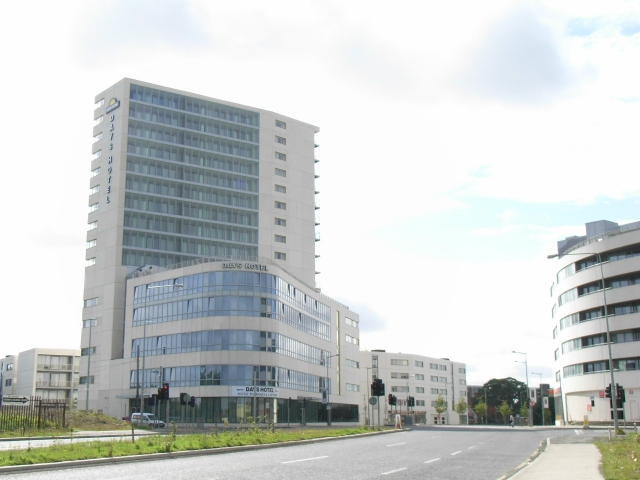
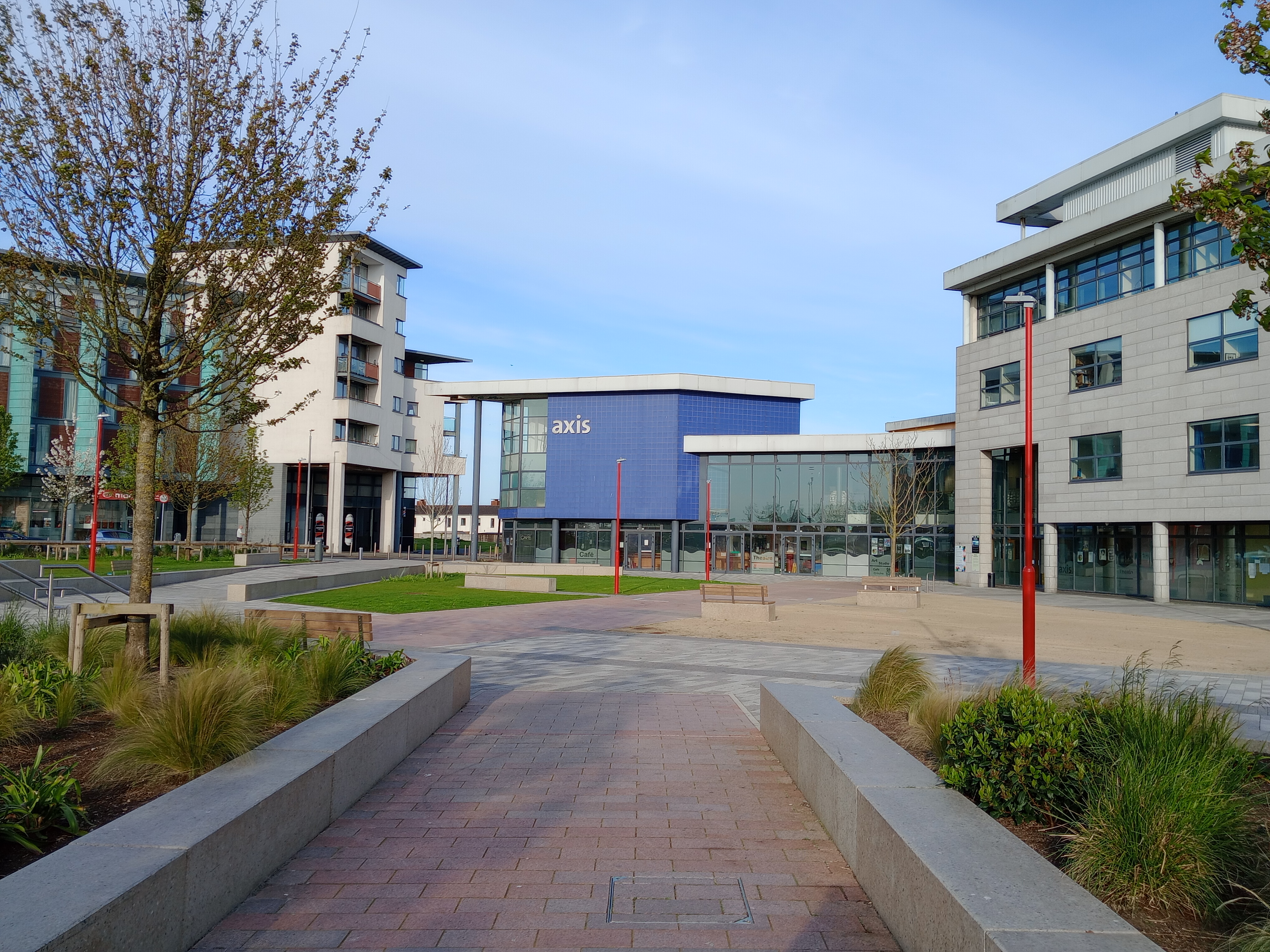
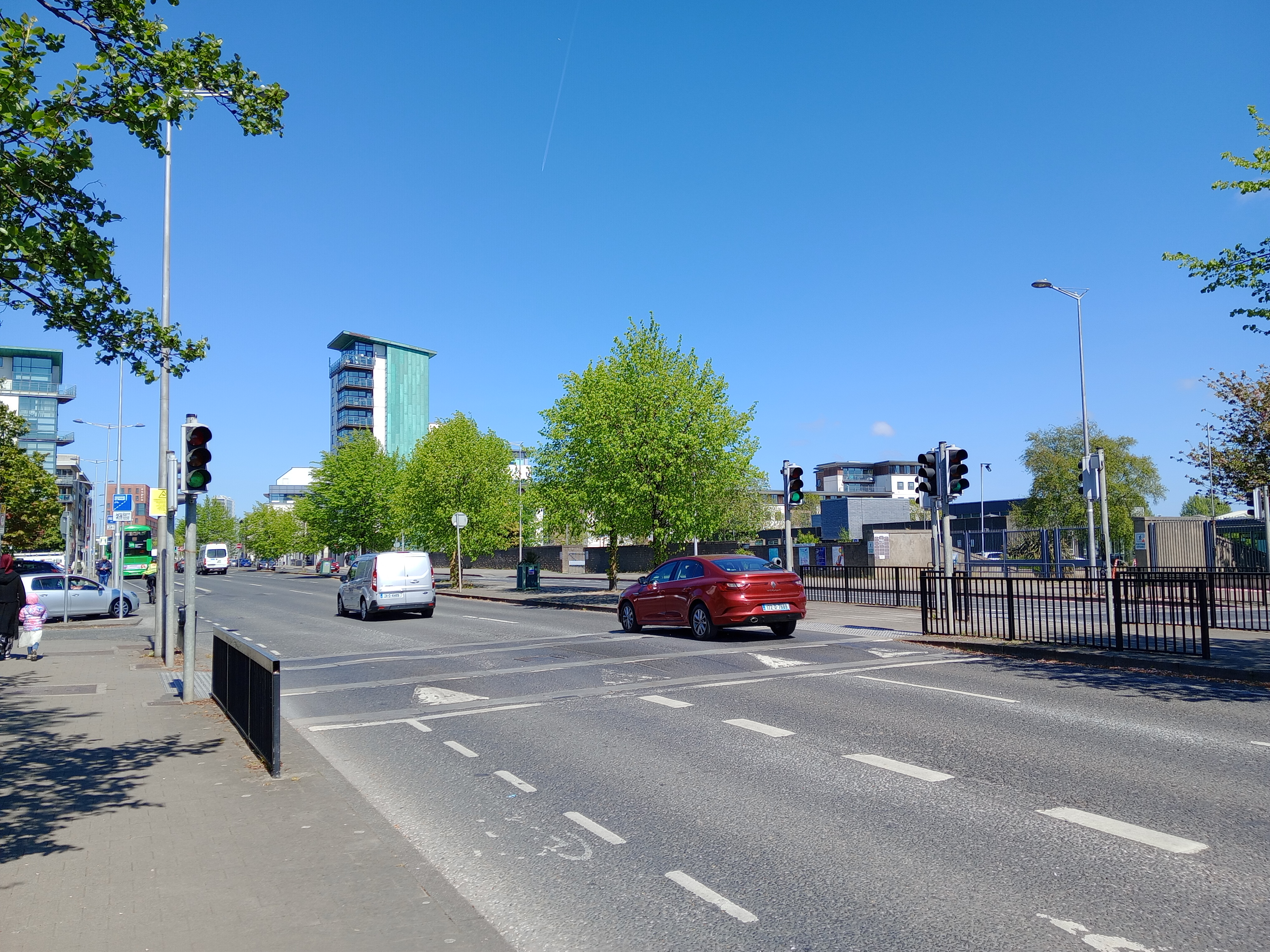
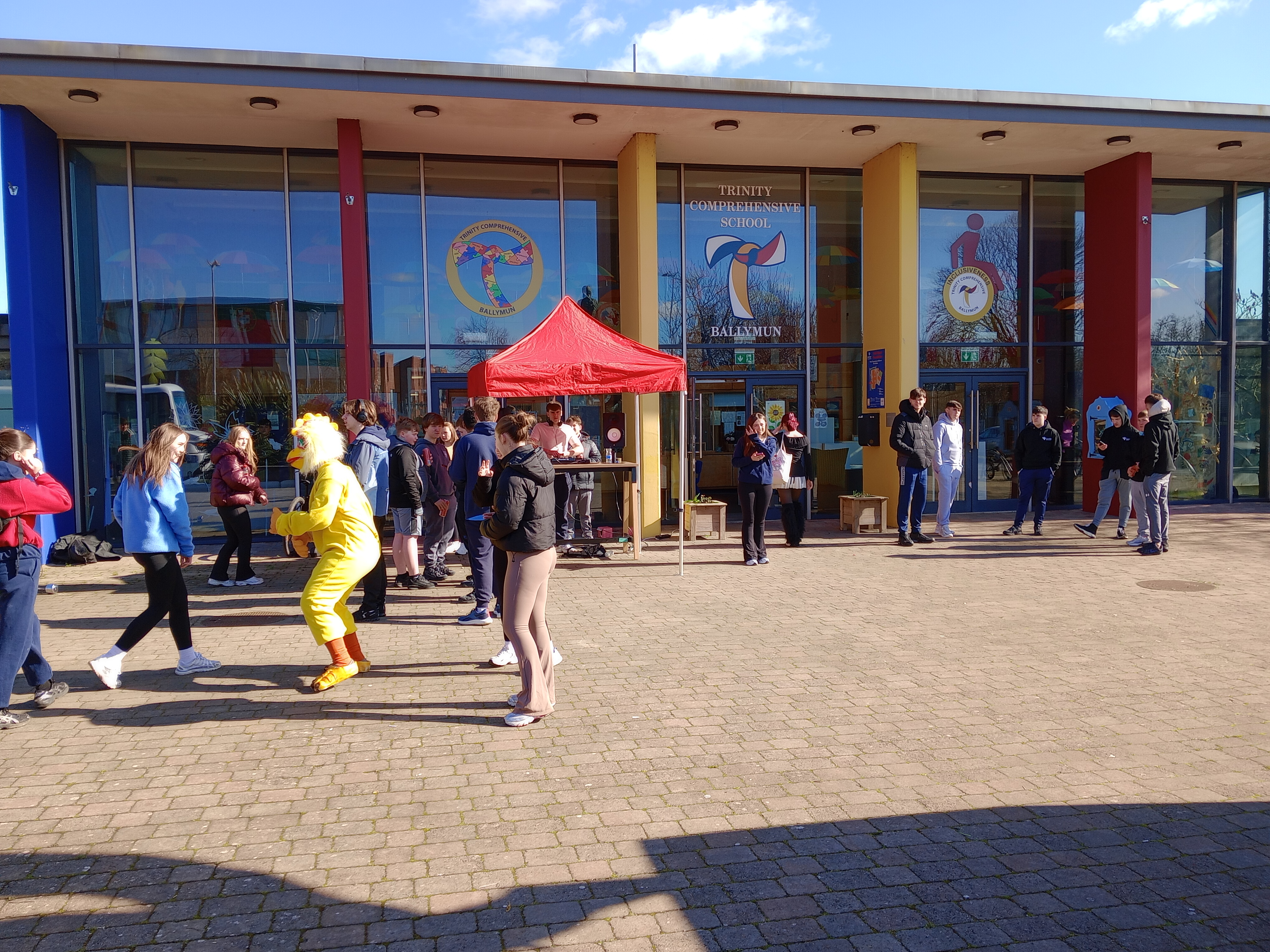
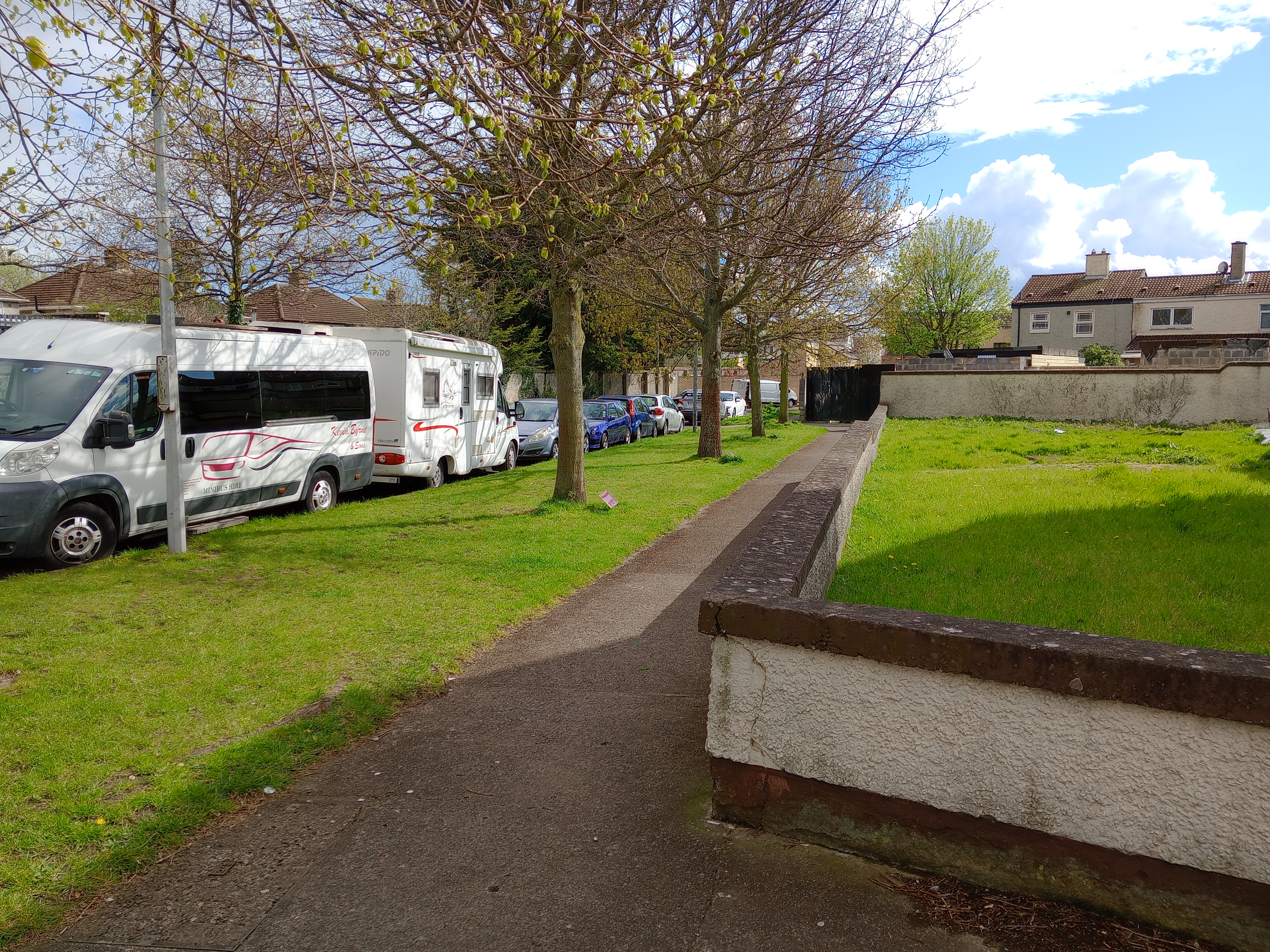
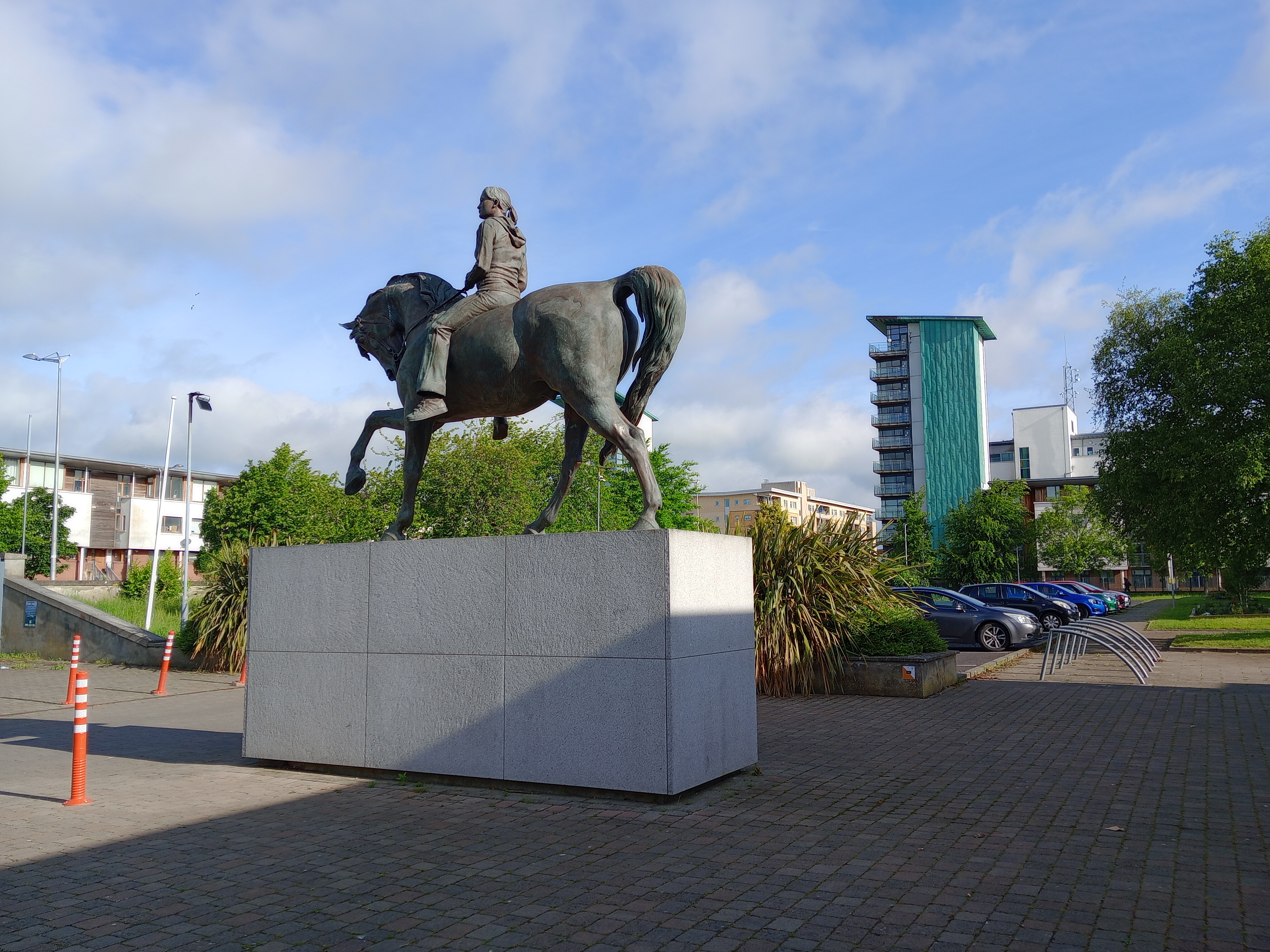
- (From top to bottom, left to right) A view of the Metro Hotel in 2007, Axis Ballymun in the Seven Heroes Square, View of Ballymun Road from Scoil an tSeachtar Laocht, Trinity Comprehensive School on Better Ballymun Day 2026, amaptocare trees in Coultry, and Misneach in Trinity Comprehensive

- Location within Dublin
- Coordinates: 53°23′51″N 06°16′03″W
- Country: Ireland
- Province: Leinster
- Region: Eastern and Midland
- Local government area: Dublin
- Local authority: Dublin City Council
- Established: May 1966; 60 years ago
- Founder: Dublin City Council, formerly known as Dublin Corporation
- Elevation: 65 m (213 ft)

Population (2022)
  - Electoral division: 22,321
- Demonyms: Ballymunner, also spelt as Ballymuner
- Time zone: UTC0 (WEST)
  - Summer (DST): UTC+1 (WEST)
- Eircode: D09, D11
- Dialing Code: +353(0)1
- Geocode: O142401
- ISO 3166 code: IE-D
- Vehicle registration: D (Dublin Region)
- Website: dublincity.ie

Ballymun (Irish: Baile Munna) is a suburb of Dublin, Ireland, at the northern edge of the city's Northside. The population was 22,321 at the 2022 census. Ballymun is close to Dublin Airport and borders the suburbs of Finglas, Glasnevin and Santry.

The area was noted for the rapid and massive development of publicly funded housing in the 1960s, especially the high-rise Ballymun Flats, and subsequent social issues, as well as a strong culture of community organisation. In the early 2000s, it was the subject of a billion euro regeneration scheme, which delivered new housing stock to replace the towers of flats, but left the area with few retail facilities, and was connected with the closure of many community groups. As part of the regeneration, major arts projects were funded, including the establishment of a civic theatre and the mass tree-planting social artwork amaptocare.

== Geography ==
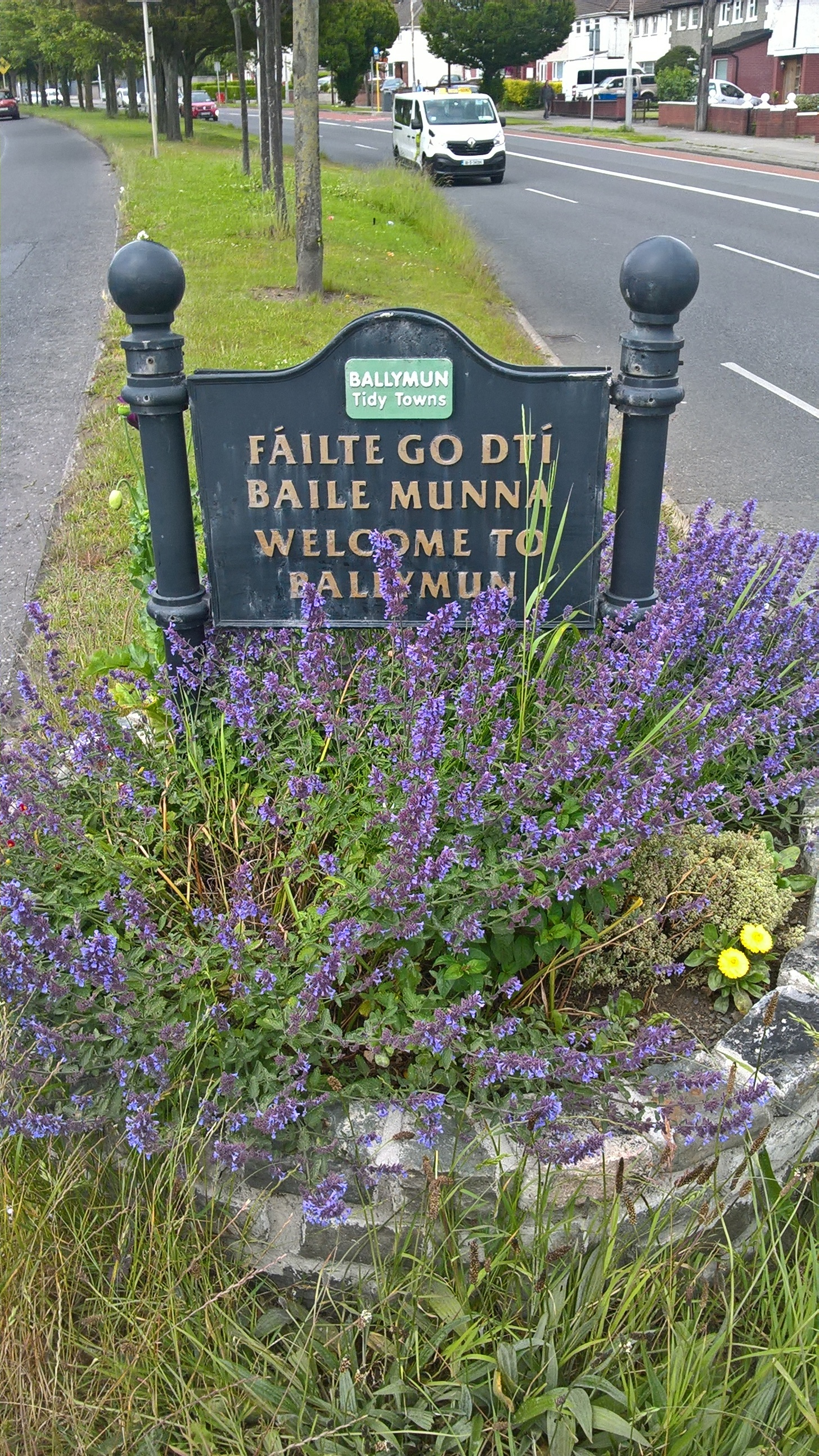
Welcome to Ballymun bilingual sign

Ballymun lies on the plains of southern Fingal (the historic area, rather than the modern county), sloping from northwest to southeast, from the catchment of the Santry River through that of the Wad River. The Santry River rises in Harristown and Dubber, northwest of Ballymun, and crosses and drains the northern parts of the district. The Wad is the area's main watershed, with several branches around Poppintree; it flows southeast, eventually reaching the estuary of the River Tolka at Clontarf.

Ballymun neighbours the suburbs of Finglas, Glasnevin and Santry. It contains five neighbourhoods, Coultry, Poppintree, Shangan, Balcurris and Sillogue. The latter takes its name from the townland of Silloge (Saileog) which is in the civil parish in Santry.

== Name ==
The name Ballymun derives from the Irish Baile (meaning 'town') and Muin or Munna (whose meaning is uncertain). The Placenames Database of Ireland notes that, while the meaning of Munna is "uncertain", the placenames surveys undertaken by John O'Donovan in the mid-19th century indicate that it may refer to a "family name". Risteard Ó Foghludha, who published a dictionary of Irish placenames in the early 20th century, indicated that the name may be derived from Bealach Munna ('the way of Munna', with Munna potentially a "saint's name"). In his work History of Santry Parish, Rev. Benjamin Adams says that Ballymun derived from the family name Munn. In his book The Villages of Dublin, Jimmy Wren theorises that Baile Muin means 'town of the shrubland' in reference to the dense forests that once grew there.

== History ==
=== Early history ===
Evidence of ancient settlement in the Ballymun area includes a number of ringfort, burnt mound and enclosure sites in the townlands of Ballymun, Balcurris and Jamestown.

St. Pappin came to the area from Kerry in the sixth century to study at the University of St. Móibhí, Glasnevin. After completing his studies, he built the Church of St Macdara, and converted the people there from Druidism to Catholicism. By 1709, when St. Pappan's Church was built, this church had long vanished.

In the 1300s, the lands at Ballymun were controlled by Baron Skryne, based in County Meath. Richard Stanyhurst was granted 180 acres in the area in 1473 upon his marriage to Agneta of the Barons of Scyrne family.

=== Early modern period ===
The Burnell family held the lands of Ballymun and Balgriffin until 1534, when John Burnell was executed for supporting the rebellion of Silken Thomas. The lands then passed to the Bathe family of Drumcondra. By 1615, Robert Barnwell of Dunbro held the lands of Ballymun, and by 1641 there were just 2 or 3 cottages and a single thatched house in the area. The population in 1659 was 10 people, 4 born in England, and 6 Irish. In 1662, just 3 residents paid a hearth tax in the area.

In the early 1700s, the tower house at Ballymun was constructed as a mill, which was subsequently taken over by an English educational society in 1744 to found a girls Charter School. It was later converted to a boys school, before closing in 1825. The building still stands and is today called Santry Lodge. Due to the dense woodland and sparse population, the area was generally regarded as dangerous in the early 1700s, with numerous highwaymen operating on the Drogheda Road. In 1829, the Freeman's Journal noted that Ballymun was a popular place for duels. The area known as Stormanstown is named after Lord Stormingston who was granted land in Ballymun by Henry VIII, with the original Stormanstown House which was built in the early 18th century. This tiled mansion was demolished in 1823, and another house of the same name replaced it. This house was used by the Albert Agricultural College as offices in the 20th century until it was demolished in 1970. Another house called Stormanstown on the corner of Glasnevin Avenue and Ballymun Road was the former residence of Brian O'Higgins. It too was demolished in the 1970s.

=== Public housing for Dublin ===
By the 1960s, Dublin's housing stock was not only under pressure from a rising population but was also poorly maintained. House collapses in Bolton Street and Fenian Street in 1963 led to the death of four people, forcing Dublin Corporation to adopt 'emergency measures' to deal with the crisis. In 1964, in a response to this housing crisis in inner city areas of the capital, plans were made to build high-rise flat complexes; construction started in 1966 and were completed by the following year. The seven 15-storey towers were named after Irish Republican revolutionaries, to commemorate the 50th anniversary of the 1916 Easter Rising. The flat complexes consisted of five 8-storey "districts" (Balbutcher, Balcurris, Coultry, Shangan and Sillogue) and three 4-storey "districts," two of which were part of Shangan and Sillogue, the third being located in Sandyhill. The Poppintree area of Ballymun was constructed in the late 1970s.

=== Original development ===
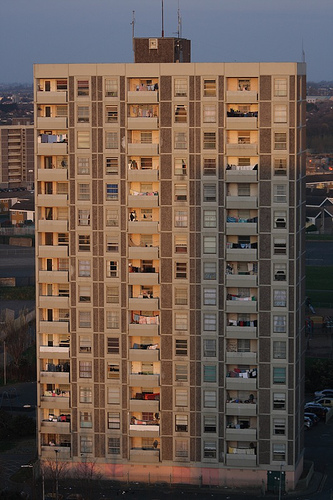
A former Ballymun Tower

At the time of its construction, Ballymun was a sought-after location and prospective tenants had to pass an interview to get housing there. There were three types of apartment building: seven "fifteen-storey" towers (which actually had 16 storeys plus plant rooms above), nineteen eight-storey blocks and ten four-storey blocks. The flats were built in the 1960s on contracts from the National Building Agency under the authority of Neil Blaney, the Fianna Fáil Minister for Local Government.

Later commentators described the development of the flats and the district as problematic, with the environmental journalist Frank McDonald, in his book The Construction of Dublin, calling it the Irish state's "worst planning disaster", but the issues were not with the apartment buildings as such but the failure to integrate construction of accommodation with provision of services, problematic maintenance, notably of the lifts, the lack of social mix, and the abrupt move of tightly knit inner-city community families to an isolated area on the very edge of the city. Dublin's City Architect, Ali Grehan, after working as a lead architect and designer with the Ballymun regeneration project, commented that the concept of the area, developed from green fields, and its new (for Ireland) types of accommodation were a "really great idea" but that the project was "doomed to fall into decline" due to poor planning and central government policies. She especially highlighted the scale of the development, its purely public housing nature, and its location — a "constructed around a roundabout ... a dead end". She also noted that the concept envisaged the shopping centre being available from the start, but delayed for years, and the issues with lift and centralised heating system (also a new idea for Ireland) maintenance.

The corporation had more gradual plans for development in multiple locations, and according to geographer Joe Brady of University College Dublin, Dublin Corporation were sceptical about the Ballymun scheme but given the weakness of Irish local government and especially its funding, had little choice but to work with the proposal from national government:

They were made an offer by... Blaney which they couldn't refuse. He offered to build them 2,500 housing units at a time when their own housing development programme had to be ramped up and when you had the additional misfortune of the collapse of the tenement blocks in Fenian Street which meant that Dublin Corporation was bounced into dealing with all of its condemned houses at once... They would have taken anything from anybody at that point.

The first tenants moved in between August 1966 and December 1966. By February 1969, when the National Building Agency's contract for Ballymun ceased and control of Ballymun was handed to Dublin Corporation, there was a total of 3,021 dwellings, fully comprising publicly owned social housing.

=== Social challenges, community activity ===
Some social problems occurred in the early years, as families which had grown up in dense city terraces close to Dublin's retail core, found themselves at the edge of the city, with few amenities beyond a small and expensive travelling "van shop". Over time, Ballymun became notorious for a number of social problems, such as drug abuse and unemployment, and was impacted by negative media coverage of the area. At the same time, a wide range of local community organisations emerged, for particular areas and towers, and for purposes such as small enterprise support, anti-drugs campaigning and community project support.

The current Ballymun district is not substantially in the townland historically called "Ballymun" — instead, it occupies several nearby townlands, the most significant of which is Stormanstown. Due to what were seen to be undesirable associations, some say that the area has shrunk since the completion of the tower blocks. For instance, in the early days of Dublin City University (DCU), then called NIHE, Dublin, this institution was sometimes referred to as being in Ballymun (part of the "Ballymun Project"), or sometimes in Whitehall, while today it is referred to and has a postal address in Glasnevin, even though it has not changed location. Indeed, much of the present day central Ballymun lies on lands once in the northern reaches of the Albert Agricultural College estate, the forerunner of the present-day DCU. Streets have also been renamed — for example, Ballymun Avenue (which was previously Collins Avenue Extension) was renamed Glasnevin Avenue after a local plebiscite in the 1970s.

The city architect commented in 2015 that the "killer blow" for Ballymun was the offering of a tenant-purchase scheme in 1985, which gave good terms for local authority tenants to buy out their accommodation, but only if they had a house, not a flat, which led to many committed community members moving from Ballymun to be able to avail of the offer. This led to a "cycle of decline" and ultimately the need for a regeneration.

=== Regeneration ===
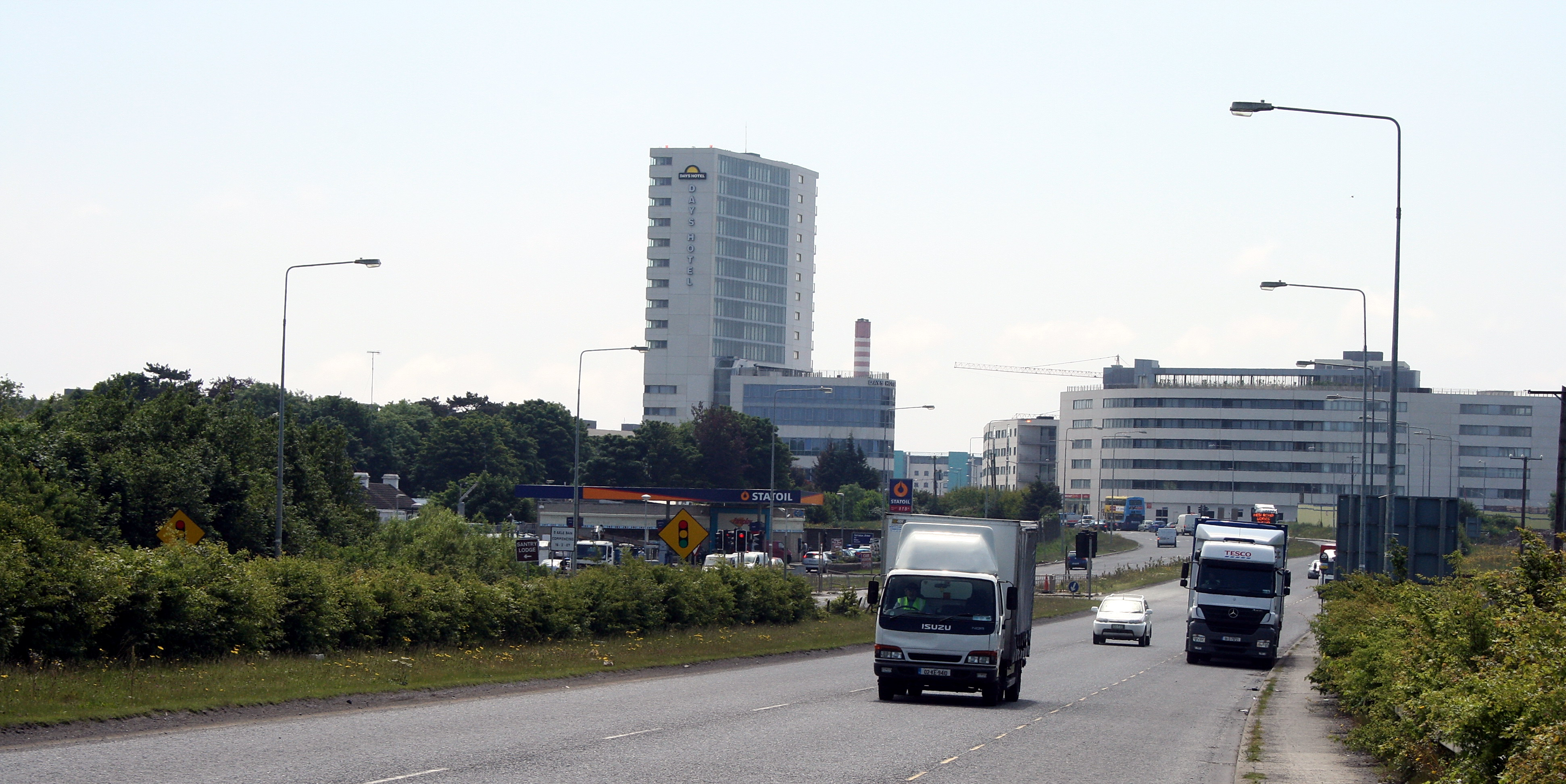
New Ballymun under construction

The government and Dublin City Council agreed an ambitious regeneration plan for Ballymun, with a budget exceeding €440 million. The creation of Ballymun Regeneration Limited as a limited company controlled by Dublin City Council initiated the main part of the project, beginning of the demolition of the Ballymun flats, and planned to conclude with the emergence of a "new town" of Ballymun. As of 2008, six of the seven towers (Pearse, Ceannt, McDermott, McDonagh, Connolly, and Clarke) as well as three eight-storey blocks and seven four-storey blocks had been demolished by DSM, with the residents generally rehoused in new "state-of-the-art" housing in Ballymun. The new housing is a mixture of public, private, voluntary and co-operative housing. The residential aspects of the "new Ballymun" were largely completed by 2013. Several films and documentary TV programmes were produced during the regeneration period.

==== Criticisms ====
During the planning and delivery process, the regeneration project attracted well-publicised questions about accountability and democratic participation. During it, most of the large number of community organisations closed. The regeneration saw the loss of many shops, including the emptying of the only shopping centre, Ballymun Shopping Centre. This meant the 18,000 residents had to travel to other districts for major grocery, and virtually all non-grocery, shopping. The shopping centre was eventually demolished in 2021. The plan for a replacement centre failed.

==== Arts during the regeneration ====
During the regeneration, an organisation named Breaking Ground was set up as a "percent for art" scheme. This organisation commissioned a range of projects, including sculptures, and two headline projects, Hotel Ballymun and amaptocare.

In 2007, a floor of the by-then vacant Thomas Clarke Tower was temporarily transformed into a hotel as part of the Hotel Ballymun art project; the project ran for a month and was heavily booked, with a waiting list.

The tree-planting project called 'amaptocare' was one of the two highest-funded arts projects in Ballymun. It involved more than 600 people sponsoring the planting of around 635 trees, and providing inscription texts to be engraved on plaques near the trees. Sponsors were informed that the all trees would be identified on a glass panel at Ballymun's central plaza. While the plaza was completed by 2013, the panel had, as of 2017, not yet been made.

The most-publicised sculpture was Misneach, which portrayed a young local woman on a horse, at 1.5 times life size. The model, Toni Marie Shields, was selected by public auditions, and 3D-imaged in London. Designed to be placed centrally in the district, it was temporarily erected in front of the area's only secondary school, where, as of 2021, it remained.

=== After regeneration ===
==== Local area plan ====
In 2017, with the formal end of the regeneration, and the dissolution of Ballymun Regeneration Limited, 2,820 apartments had been replaced by just under 2,000 units of social housing, and 1,350 units of privately owned housing, mostly rented out. The area had moved from 80% of residents living in social housing to just under 60%, with one in eight in private rental, and 28% owner-occupied. In July 2017, the City Council approved a Local Area Plan for the area, to govern future development. This plan provided for around 2,000 housing units, of which a significant percentage would be for sale, but with developers to be required to sell 10% to the council or an Approved Housing Body for social housing. The plan included guidance for 31 distinct sites, totalling 34 hectares, and including as a priority redevelopment of the almost-derelict central shopping centre.

==== 2018 Metro Hotel Dublin ====
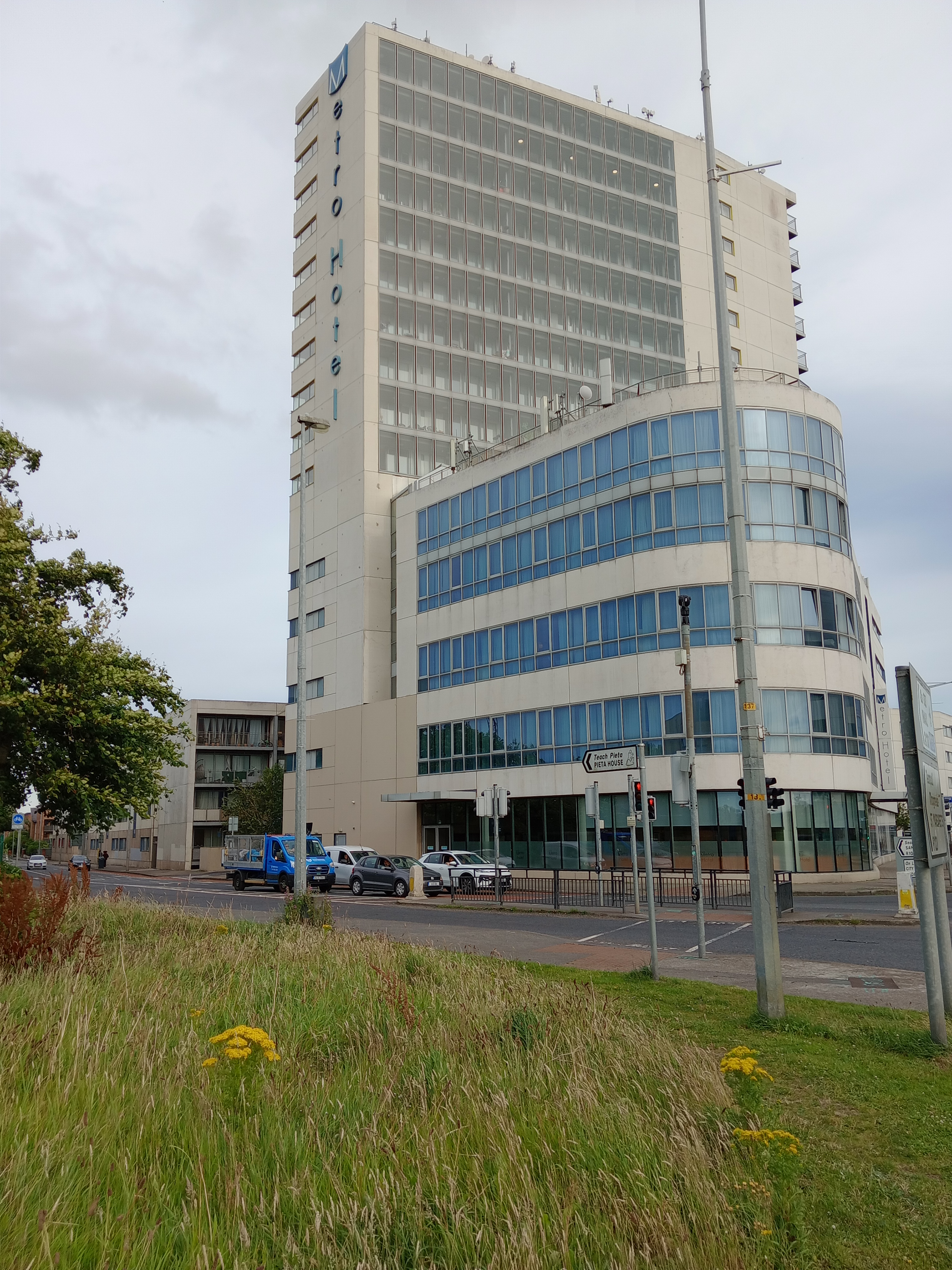
Metro Hotel Dublin Airport, Ballymun

A multistorey hotel fire occurred in the building containing the Metro Hotel and two floors of apartments, on 21 March 2018. The fire broke out in a private residence on the 13th floor, above rooms for hotel guests, at approximately 8.00 pm. It affected the top seven floors of the building. At least 12 units of Dublin Fire Brigade attended the building, and confirmed that the hotel was successfully evacuated. The fire was extinguished and there were no reports of any casualties or people unaccounted for.

The 15-storey hotel and apartment building was built as part of the Ballymun renewal, developed in 2006 by Pierce Contracting and a group of investors who included businessman Paddy Kelly. The hotel was designed by Shay Cleary Architects for Pierse Contracting and was originally scheduled to open in June 2006, and was operated by the Days Inn Hotel group.

In 2007 a charter plane with 118 passengers and crew narrowly avoided crashing into the hotel after its pilot mistook the red lighting on the hotel's roof combined with its white internal light for the approach lights of a Dublin Airport runway. The incident occurred at 11.34 pm on the night of 16 August 2007, when the McDonnell Douglas jet was carrying 112 passengers and six crew on a charter flight from Lisbon to Dublin.

In April 2014, the 88-bedroom Metro Hotel was put on the market in the region of €2.5 million. Along with the hotel, the sellers sought €3 million for the 30 two-bed apartments on the upper floors of the property. In July 2016, planning permission was refused for the retention of masts and antennae on the hotel.

== Transport ==
Ballymun is served by a number of Dublin Bus routes to the city centre including the numbers 19, E1 and the E2 while the Go-Ahead Ireland route 220 runs between Mulhuddart and DCU Helix and the 220T runs from Finglas Garda station to Whitehall.

The area was also envisaged to have an underground stop on the planned Metro North (Dublin city centre to Swords) line of the Dublin Metro. Plans for that have been revived with the Irish Government's 'Project Ireland 2040' scheme and the revised MetroLink concept.

== Amenities ==
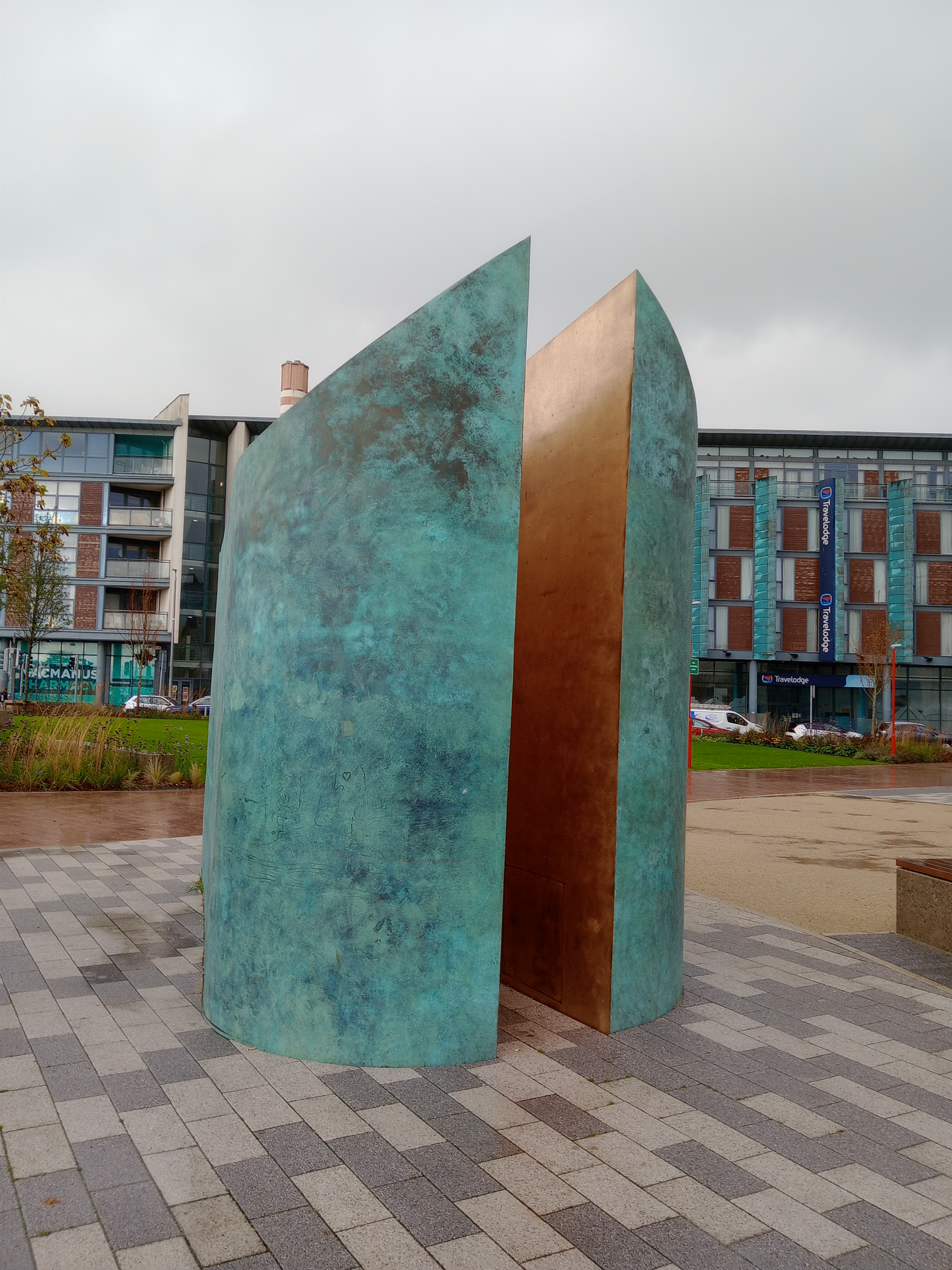
Cathode/Anode sculpture on Main Street, Ballymun

=== Education ===
There are a number of schools in each sub-district, including a Gaelscoil (Irish language primary school) in the Coultry district and another on Main Street, opposite to Trinity Comprehensive School which is the only secondary school in Ballymun; this was formerly known as Ballymun Comprehensive and split between boys on the North side and girls on the South side before a major reconfiguration in 2005.

=== Retail ===
From the earliest years of the area's development, due to delays in building retail units, it was served by "van shops", which remained into the 2000s.

The area's only shopping centre, Ballymun Shopping Centre, was built as a central point for the whole community, and was the main source for shopping for over 40 years. It was owned by the City Council, and rented units on commercial terms, with, as of 1991, a rent roll of half a million euro, and service charge income of 300,000 euro. By that time, there were urgent calls from traders and locals for serious refurbishment, but it proved hard to progress these issues due to questions about who should fund any work. Redevelopment of the centre was a major element of the Ballymun Masterplan from 1997, and was to be private sector-led. 53% of the centre and surrounding site was sold to major developer Treasury Holdings for 6 million pounds in 2000, with the local authority retaining the rest. As of 2000, the centre was to be redeveloped by 2005, but there were delays.

In 2009, when Ireland was recovering from financial crisis, the developer secured permission for a complex to be called Springcross, involving a planned investment of 800 million euro to provide more than 70 shopping and office units, cinema and other entertainment facilities, dining places, a new public library branch, and a creche. Construction was planned to begin by 2010, but by then the site had been taken over by State agency NAMA, and the project was unable to proceed. Various units had closed during and after the disruption of the regeneration, and the anchor tenant, Tesco Ireland, handed back its unit early in 2014. In May 2014, NAMA and Treasury's receivers agreed to sell the 53% share back to the council, and in 2016 the Council used compulsory purchase powers to secure clear title to the whole complex, with the final lessees leaving mid-2018, and the centre being boarded up. In 2019, a 1.9 million euro contract to clear the site was awarded, and main demolition started mid-2019. The council announced plans to sell the site to a new developer, who would be permitted to construct a combined retail and residential building. As of 2025, the site remained vacant.

Aside from the shopping centre, there was a Supervalu supermarket, and in 2020, a Lidl store also opened; the Supervalu closed in late 2023. The area is otherwise served by shopping centres in Finglas and Santry. As of 2004, 78% of locals shopped at least once a week in a van shop, 66% in Ballymun Shopping Centre, 44% in Omni Park in Santry and 19% in Finglas.

A small AIB branch, which used to be a Bank of Ireland branch before closure in 1984, was demolished in 2017 and replaced by a new AIB branch near the Civic Centre. The Republic of Ireland's only IKEA store is located between Ballymun and Finglas, on St. Margaret's Road, and is named for the area; the shop has sometimes been the highest-earning IKEA store in the world. A first Irish store for Decathlon, branded Decathlon Baile Munna / Ballymun, was opened adjacent to the IKEA in 2020.

=== Civic centre ===
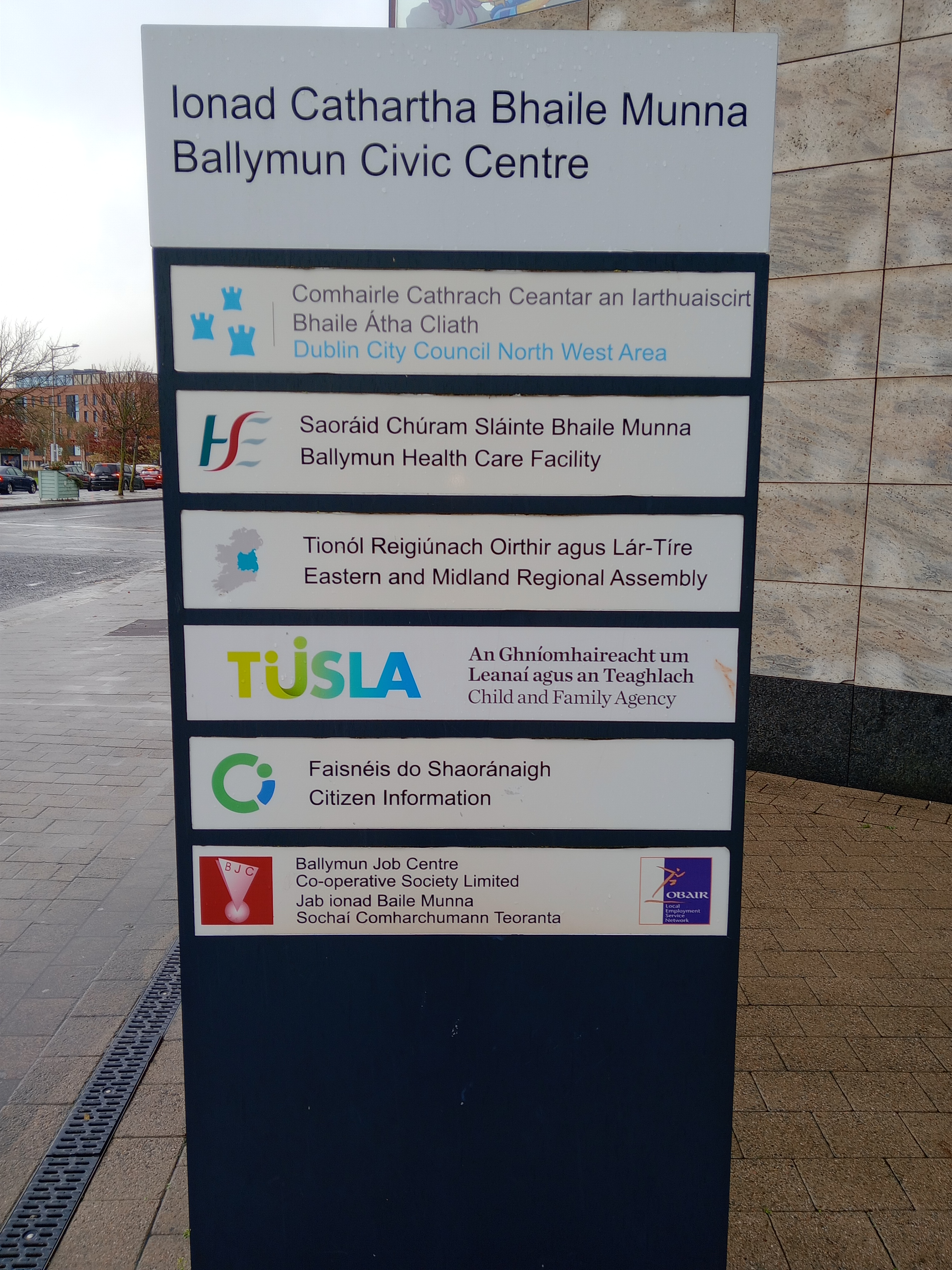
Ballymun Civic Centre bilingual signs

On the site of a former large underpass and roundabout, a new civic complex was built, including The Axis Arts Centre (opened in 2001), with the local health centre (completed and opened in 2003) and Garda station also moved here, although their defunct buildings remained across the road. City Council offices are also here, although the offices handling some services, such as driver licensing and motor taxation, closed as part of broader changes in such service delivery.

=== Other amenities ===
A number of green spaces, parks and playgrounds have been built around the district, and some were remodelled during the regeneration, notably Poppintree Park. There is a branch of Dublin city's public library service south of central Ballymun.

Two hotels, Travelodge and Metro, are located in this area, as well as a city-owned gym and leisure centre (the previous Ballymun swimming pool was demolished in 2016).

=== Religion ===
There is a church in the old village centre, which was built in 1847 and replaced a penal chapel. Ballymun is a parish in the Fingal South West deanery of the Roman Catholic Archdiocese of Dublin. Ballymun parish is called St. Pappin's Parish which consist of three churches. the three churches are the Virgin Mary Church on Shanghan Road, the Holy Spirit Church on Sillogue Road and St. Joseph's Church in Poppintree.

== Sport ==
There are a number of local sports groups in Ballymun. These include Ballymun United Football Club, the local association football club. Gaelic Athletic Association (GAA) clubs in the area include Ballymun Kickhams Gaelic Football Club and Setanta Hurling Club.

== Governance ==
Ballymun is in the jurisdiction of Dublin City Council, in the council's North West Area, and hosts one of two area offices for that division of the city, the other being in Finglas. For local elections, it is part of the local electoral area of Ballymun–Finglas.

== Events ==
An improvement project started by students at Trinity Comprehensive School, Better Ballymun Day, has been held annually since February 2020. In its first year, over 2000 locals participated in over 60 projects around Ballymun. The project mostly consists of several litter-picking, recycling and painting initiatives around the suburb. It is supported by Trinity Comprehensive School, Ballymun Tidy Towns and Dublin City Council.

== In the media ==
For decades, Ballymun's reputation was impacted by negative publicity in the media, which often placed more focus on crime and drugs than on positive news from the area.

=== Television and film ===
==== Filming location ====
The 1992 film Into the West was set and filmed in Ballymun. Other fictional works that were set in the area include the 1994 drama mini-series Family and the 1982 short film One Day Time.

While not set in Ballymun, the 2002 British-Irish film based around the 1972 "Bloody Sunday" incident in Northern Ireland, Bloody Sunday, film was mostly shot in Ballymun, with some location scenes shot in Northern Ireland.

==== Documentary ====
Several documentaries of the area have been made throughout the years, notably during the regeneration. A film of the leisure centre by filmmakers Joe Lawlor and Christine Molloy, LEISURE CENTRE, was made in 2007 and starred hundreds of Ballymun residents. A documentary film entitled Ballymun Lullaby was released in February 2011 and includes scenes detailing the regeneration of Ballymun as well as its impact on the culture of its populace.

The 2018 documentary, The 4th Act, explored the regeneration of Ballymun, with contextual material about the area's history; it contained appearances from several community activists, and City Council and BRL officials, and the artists, Seamus Nolan and Jochen Gerz, who led the Hotel Ballymun and amaptocare art projects respectively. It also highlighted the compilation of the area's oral history project.

=== Books ===
In September 2006, Gill & Macmillan published The Mun: Growing up in Ballymun, by Lynn Connolly. This memoir spans the history of Ballymun from its inception to the regeneration of the area, and includes Connolly's fond memories of the area. In April 2009, Gill & Macmillan also published Ballymun resident Rachael Keogh's account of her life as a heroin addict, Dying to Survive.

In 2010, New Island Books published The Ballymun Trilogy by the Dublin playwright, Dermot Bolger: three plays that chart forty years of life in Ballymun. The plays premiered in Axis in Ballymun before being staged internationally.

== Notable residents ==
- Patrick Clarke, filmmaker
- Aoife Dooley, writer, illustrator and comedienne
- Glen Hansard, musician
- M. J. Hyland, author, lived there for two years and uses the experience in "Carry Me Down"
- Catherine McAuley, founder of the Sisters of Mercy, was born in Stormanstown House, a Georgian house that stood on the site now occupied by Ballymun Library
- James McCarthy, Gaelic footballer with Ballymun Kickhams
- Philly McMahon, Gaelic footballer
- Barney Rock, Gaelic footballer
- Dean Rock, Gaelic footballer with Ballymun Kickhams

== See also ==
- List of towns and villages in Ireland

== Bibliography ==
- McCrann, Aibhlín; Prichard, David; Ó Broin, Deiric; Power, Anne; King, Ronan; Montague, John; Stewart, Duncan; Tierney, John; Davies, Anna; Wyse Jackson, Peter; Cuffe, Ciarán; Whyte, Gerry; Ballagh, Robert; Ryan, Michele; Bolger, Dermot; Munck, Ronnie; Waters, John (2008). Memories Milestones and New Horizons Reflections on the Regeneration of Ballymun. Belfast, Northern Ireland: Blackstaff Press. ISBN 978-0-85640-835-9.
- Doyle, Joseph W. (2013). Dublin, 2013 (8th ed.). Ten Dozen Waters.
- Wren, Jimmy (1982). The Villages of Dublin. Dublin: Tomar Publishing Enterprises. p. 18.
- McDonald, Frank (1989). Saving the city : how to halt the destruction of Dublin. Dublin: Tomar Pub. p. 73. ISBN 1-871793-03-3. OCLC 21019180.
- Income Levels and Spending Preferences of Ballymun People / Part 9. Dublin, Ireland: Ballymun Partnership. 2004. pp. 2, 6.
- Connolly, Lynn (2006). The Mun: Growing Up in Ballymun. Gill & Macmillan. ISBN 9780717140428.
- Uí Chribín, Míne (c. 2011). Ballymun Cross R.I.P.
