= Moon (Korean name) =

Korean name

Moon (Korean: 문), also spelled Mun, is a Korean family name and a Korean given name.

== Family name ==
As a family name, Moon is written with one hanja, meaning "writing" (文; 글월 문 geurwol mun). The 2000 South Korean census found a total of 426,927 people and 132,881 households with this family name. They identified with 47 different surviving bon-gwan (origin of a clan lineage, not necessarily the actual residence of the clan members):

- Nampyeong (Naju): 380,530 people and 118,491 households
- Gangneung: 4,646 people and 1,493 households. They claim common ancestry with the Nampyeong Moon clan through Mun Jang-pil (문장필; 文章弼), a Goryeo Dynasty military figure.
- Gamcheon: 4,382 people and 1,367 households
- Papyeong (Paju): 2,687 people and 743 households
- Gyeongju: 2,609 people and 844 households
- Naju: 2,537 people and 765 households
- Hampyeong: 2,194 people and 612 households
- 40 other bon-gwan with fewer than 2,000 people each: 27,342 people and 8,496 households

In a study by the National Institute of the Korean Language based on 2007 application data for South Korean passports, it was found that 73.5% of people with this surname spelled it in Latin letters as Moon in their passports, while another 26.4% spelled it as Mun.

== Given name ==
People with the given name Moon include:

- Chŏng Mun, Goryeo dynasty civil official
- Kim Mun, Joseon dynasty civil official
- Woo Mun, South Korean politician, member of the National Assembly

== See also ==
- List of Korean family names
- List of Korean given names
