= Trillick railway station =

Railway station in County Tyrone, Northern Ireland

Trillick

General information
- Location: Trillick, County Tyrone, Northern Ireland; UK
- Coordinates: 54.461033°N 7.534930°W

History
- Original company: Londonderry and Enniskillen Railway
- Post-grouping: Great Northern Railway (Ireland)

Key dates
- 19 August 1854: Station opens
- 1 October 1957: Station closes
Location

Trillick railway station served Trillick in County Tyrone in Northern Ireland.

The Londonderry and Enniskillen Railway opened the station on 19 August 1854. It was taken over by the Great Northern Railway (Ireland) in 1883.

It closed on 1 October 1957.

== Routes ==
Preceding station	Disused railways	Following station
Dromore Road	Londonderry and Enniskillen Railway; Londonderry to Enniskillen	Bundoran Junction
