= Omagh rail tragedy =

1950 railway accident in Omagh, Northern Ireland

- Date: 24 November 1950
- Location: Omagh railway station, County Tyrone, Northern Ireland
- Type: Railway accident

The Omagh rail tragedy was a railway accident on 24 November 1950 in Omagh, County Tyrone, Northern Ireland, that killed five railway workers. They were struck by a passenger train while carrying out maintenance on the Derry Road line in heavy fog, and the noise of another train idling in the station prevented them from hearing the oncoming train.

== Background ==
The accident occurred on the "Derry Road" line, operated by the Great Northern Railway (Ireland), which connected Omagh with Derry and was an important route for passenger and freight traffic in mid‑20th‑century Northern Ireland. Omagh was a busy railway town, with multiple trains passing through its station each day. Permanent way workers (or waymen) were employed to repair and inspect the track.

== Accident and aftermath ==
On the morning of 24 November 1950, a passenger train travelling from Derry to Belfast via Omagh struck a squad of workers as it entered Omagh station at about 10:33 am. The men were carrying out maintenance on the track alongside a recently arrived Enniskillen train. The station lay on a sharp bend, and visibility was reduced by heavy fog.

Doctors, clergy, and police attended the scene, and ambulances conveyed the injured to Tyrone County Hospital and the dead to the morgue. Five men were killed. John Cleary (55) and John Cassidy (48) died at the scene. John McCrory (51) died within an hour of admission to hospital; Daniel McCrory (46) died a few hours later; and Charles Flanagan (50) died the following day in hospital. Together, the deceased left behind 19 children. The Great Northern Railway Company issued a statement expressing regret at the accident, while the Omagh Chamber of commerce sent letters of sympathy to both the company, and the bereaved families.

== Legacy ==
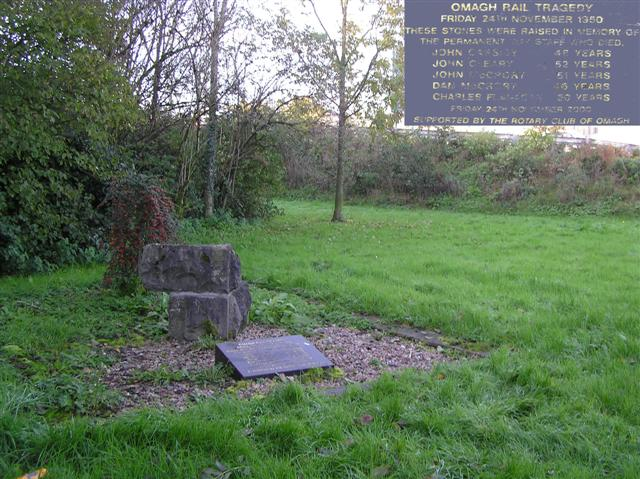
Memorial stone commemorating the five men

A memorial stone was unveiled at Dromore Road, Omagh, in November 2000 to mark the 50th anniversary of the accident. Relatives of the victims were joined by former Great Northern Railway staff, and the ceremony included the planting of five rose bushes in memory of those killed. A memorial garden was established at the former station master's house in Omagh, incorporating a section of track from the Derry Road line, and interpretive panels recounting the accident. The garden was renovated ahead of the 75th anniversary in November 2025, when more than 200 people, including relatives of the victims, attended a remembrance service organised by Fermanagh and Omagh District Council.
