= Newtownstewart railway station =

Railway station in Northern Ireland, 1852–1965

Newtownstewart

General information
- Location: Newtownstewart, County Tyrone, Northern Ireland; UK
- Coordinates: 54.722450°N 7.375047°W

History
- Original company: Londonderry and Enniskillen Railway
- Post-grouping: Great Northern Railway (Ireland)

Key dates
- 9 May 1852: Station opens
- 15 February 1965: Station closes
Location

Newtownstewart railway station served Newtownstewart in County Tyrone in Northern Ireland.

The Londonderry and Enniskillen Railway opened the station on 9 May 1852. It was taken over by the Great Northern Railway (Ireland) in 1883.

It closed on 15 February 1965.

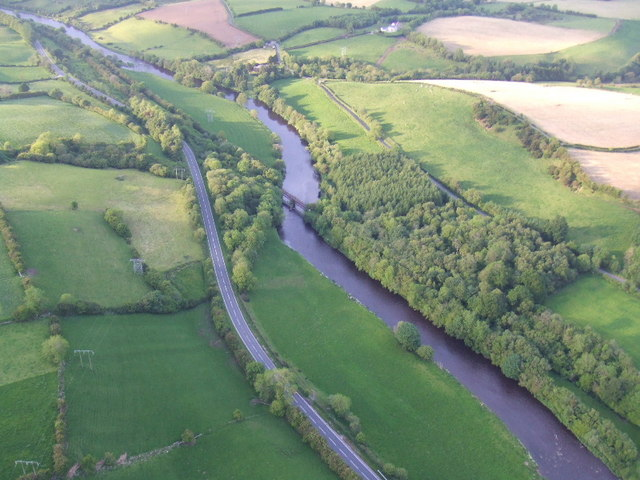
Blackrock Bridge near Newtownstewart, carrying the closed GNR mainline that ran through County Tyrone.

== Routes ==
Preceding station	Disused railways	Following station
Victoria Bridge	Londonderry and Enniskillen Railway; Londonderry to Enniskillen	Omagh
