= Dromore Road railway station =

Railway station in Northern Ireland

Dromore Road

General information
- Location: Dromore, County Tyrone, Northern Ireland; UK
- Coordinates: 54.495589°N 7.460789°W

History
- Original company: Londonderry and Enniskillen Railway
- Post-grouping: Great Northern Railway (Ireland)

Key dates
- 16 January 1854: Station opens
- 1 October 1957: Station closes
Location

Dromore Road railway station served Dromore in County Tyrone in Northern Ireland.

The Londonderry and Enniskillen Railway opened the station on 16 January 1854. It was taken over by the Great Northern Railway (Ireland) in 1883.

It closed on 1 October 1957.

== Routes ==
Preceding station	Disused railways	Following station
Fintona Junction	Londonderry and Enniskillen Railway; Londonderry to Enniskillen	Trillick
