= Fintona Junction railway station =

Railway station in County Tyrone, Northern Ireland

Fintona Junction

General information
- Location: Fintona, County Tyrone, Northern Ireland; UK
- Coordinates: 54.504705°N 7.326075°W

History
- Opened: 1 May 1856
- Closed: 1 October 1957
- Original company: Londonderry and Enniskillen Railway
- Post-grouping: Great Northern Railway (Ireland)
Location

Fintona Junction railway station served Fintona in County Tyrone in Northern Ireland.

The Londonderry and Enniskillen Railway opened the station on 1 May 1856. It was taken over by the Great Northern Railway (Ireland) in 1883.

It closed on 1 October 1957.

Preceding station	Disused railways	Following station
Omagh	Londonderry and Enniskillen Railway; Londonderry to Enniskillen	Dromore Road
Terminus	Londonderry and Enniskillen Railway; Londonderry to Enniskillen	Fintona
