= Fintona railway station =

Railway station in County Tyrone, Northern Ireland

Fintona
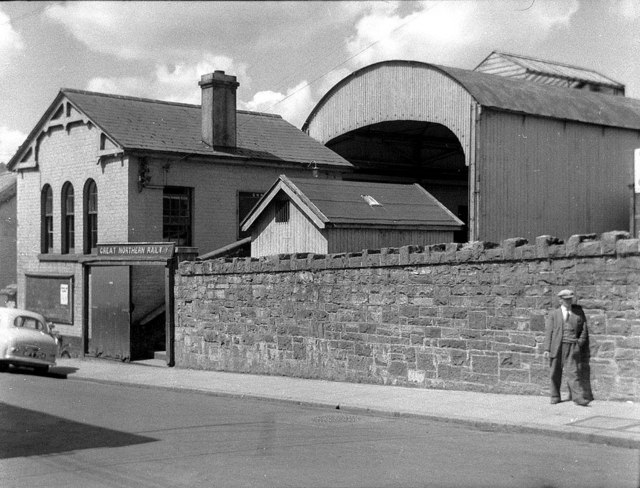
- The entrance to the station at Fintona on 7 June 1957

General information
- Location: Fintona, County Tyrone, Northern Ireland; UK
- Coordinates: 54.497366°N 7.319691°W

History
- Original company: Londonderry and Enniskillen Railway
- Post-grouping: Great Northern Railway (Ireland)

Key dates
- 5 June 1853: Station opens
- 1 October 1957: Station closes
Location

Fintona railway station served Fintona in County Tyrone in Northern Ireland.

== History ==
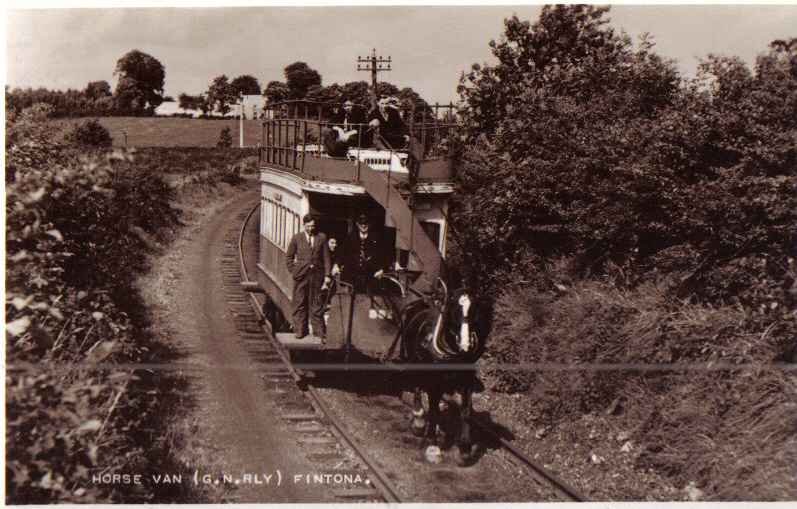
Fintona horse tram

The Londonderry and Enniskillen Railway opened the station on 5 June 1853. From 1856, mainline services were withdrawn, and the station was the terminus of a branch line from Fintona Junction railway station. Passenger services on this branch line were worked by a horse, from 1883 until the closure of the line with a double-deck tram car. Freight services, however, were worked by a locomotive.

It was taken over by the Great Northern Railway (Ireland) in 1883.

The line closed on 1 October 1957, having been the last horse-worked passenger railway on the island of Ireland.

== Routes ==
| Preceding station | Disused railways | Following station |
|---|---|---|
| Omagh | Londonderry and Enniskillen Railway; Londonderry to Enniskillen 1853-1856 | Terminus |
| Fintona Junction | Londonderry and Enniskillen Railway; Londonderry to Enniskillen 1856-1957 | Terminus |
