= Omagh railway station =

Railway station in County Tyrone, Northern Ireland

Omagh
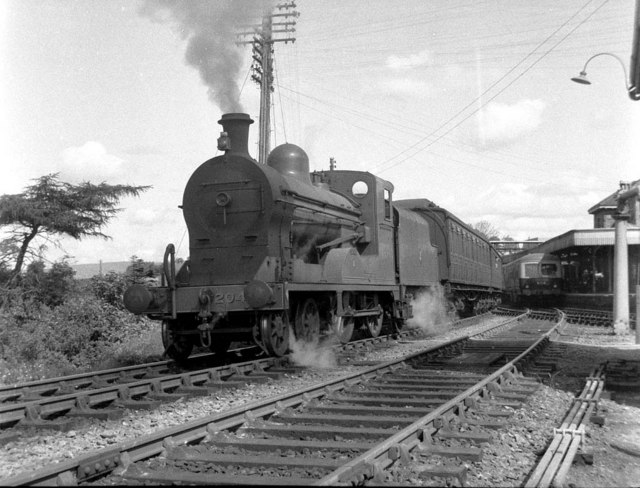
- Passenger train hauled by GNRI Class U locomotive no. 204 Antrim leaves Omagh on 7 June 1957

General information
- Location: Railway Terrace, James Street; Omagh, County Tyrone; Northern Ireland; UK
- Coordinates: 54.598767°N 7.310309°W
- Platforms: 2

Other information
- Status: Demolished

History
- Original company: Londonderry and Enniskillen Railway
- Post-grouping: Great Northern Railway (Ireland)

Key dates
- 13 September 1852: Station opens
- 15 February 1965: Station closes
Location

Omagh railway station was a railway station that served Omagh in County Tyrone in Northern Ireland.

== History ==
The Londonderry and Enniskillen Railway opened the first station on 13 September 1852.

A series of temporary stations, near the junction with the Portadown, Dungannon and Omagh Junction Railway, served the town until 3 March 1863 when a new, joint station - shared by the two companies (or, rather, their successors)- was opened at the junction.

The station was taken over by the Great Northern Railway (Ireland) in 1883.

On 24 November 1950, five permanent way workers were killed when a passenger train struck them in heavy fog as it entered the station. The incident is known as the Omagh rail tragedy and is commemorated locally with a memorial stone and garden.

It closed on 15 February 1965 when the Ulster Transport Authority mothballed the Derry Road line.

== Railway Revival ==
Translink and Northern Ireland Railways are planning to reopen railway lines in Northern Ireland including the Derry Road line from Portadown to Derry, which would reintroduce rail services to Omagh as well as in Dungannon and Strabane.

== Routes ==
Preceding station	Disused railways	Following station
Newtownstewart; Line and station closed	Londonderry and Enniskillen Railway; Londonderry to Enniskillen 1853 - 1856	Fintona; Line and station closed
Newtownstewart; Line and station closed	Londonderry and Enniskillen Railway; Londonderry to Enniskillen 1856 - 1957	Fintona Junction; Line and station closed
Beragh; Line and station closed	Portadown, Dungannon and Omagh Junction Railway; Portadown to Omagh	Terminus
	Proposed Services	
Dungannon	All-Island Strategic Rail Review; Derry-Portadown Line	Strabane

== Gallery ==
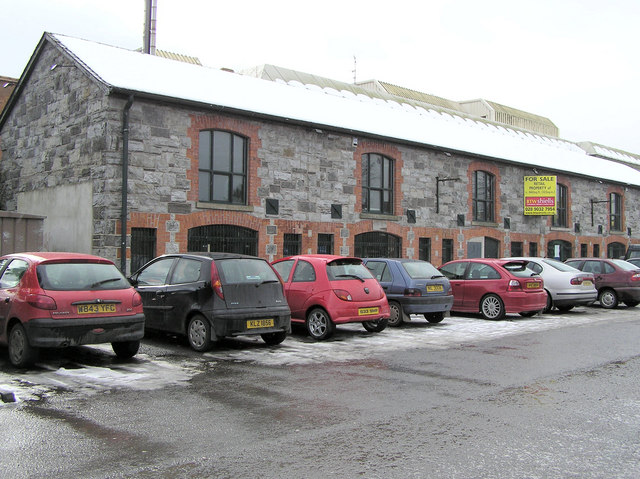
Railway Goods Building in Omagh.

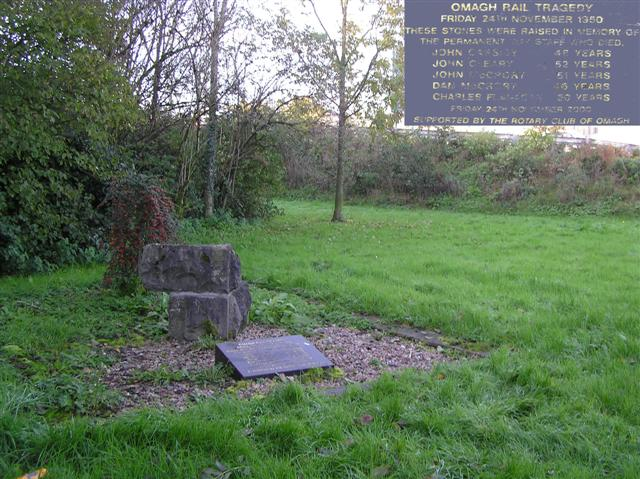
Omagh Rail Tragedy Memorial.

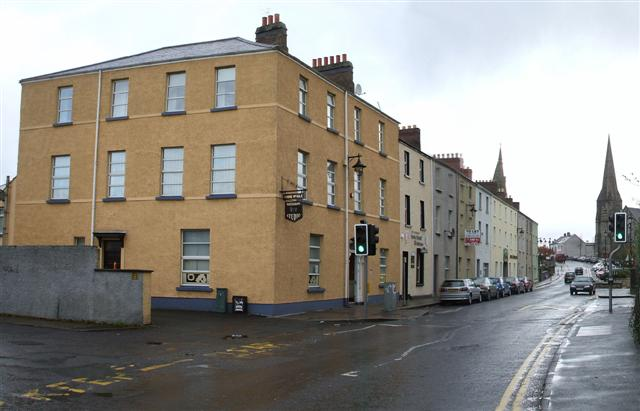
Formerly named the Station Hotel in Omagh.

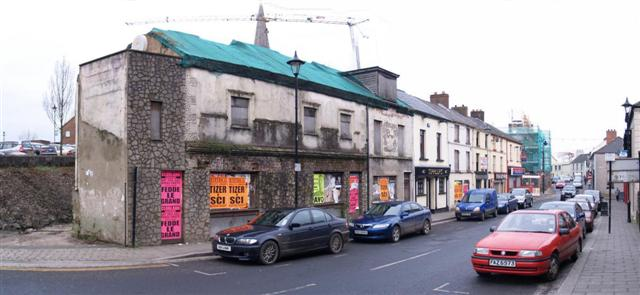
"The First and Last" Pub, being the first and last pub on the way to the station in Omagh, which is also currently closed.
