= R241 road (Ireland) =

Road in Ireland

R241 road
- Bóthar R241
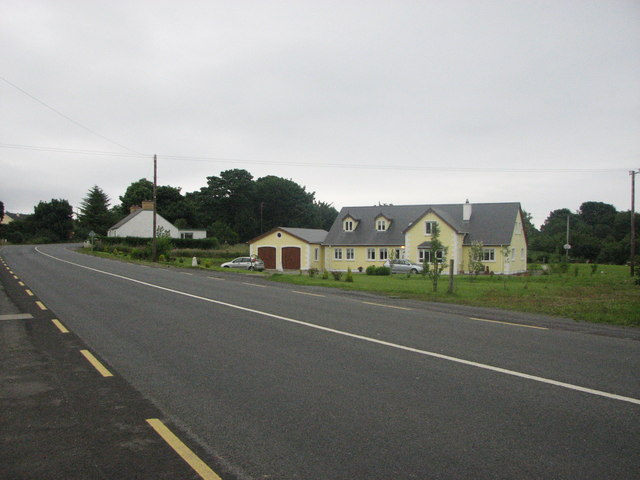
- R241 between Moville and Greencastle

Route information
- Length: 9.0 km (5.6 mi)

Major junctions
- From: R238 at Moville, Inishowen, County Donegal
- To: Shrove (or Shroove)

Location
- Country: Ireland
- Primary destinations: Greencastle; Inishowen Head

Highway system
- Roads in Ireland; Motorways; Primary; Secondary; Regional
← R240	→ R242

The R241 road is a regional road in the north-west of Ireland. It is a coastal road on the eastern side of Inishowen, a peninsula in the north of County Donegal in Ulster. The road forms part of the Wild Atlantic Way. Part of the road is on the Inishowen Head Loop walking trail.

The R241 travels northeast from the R238 at Moville. The road travels along the western shore of Lough Foyle via Greencastle before ending near Inishowen Head at Shrove. The Shrove Lighthouses are located here. Originally built in the late 1830s, only the West Lighthouse remains operational. The R241 is 9.0 km (5.6 mi) long.

== See also ==
- Roads in Ireland
