= R238 road (Ireland) =

Regional road in Ireland

R238 road
- Bóthar R238
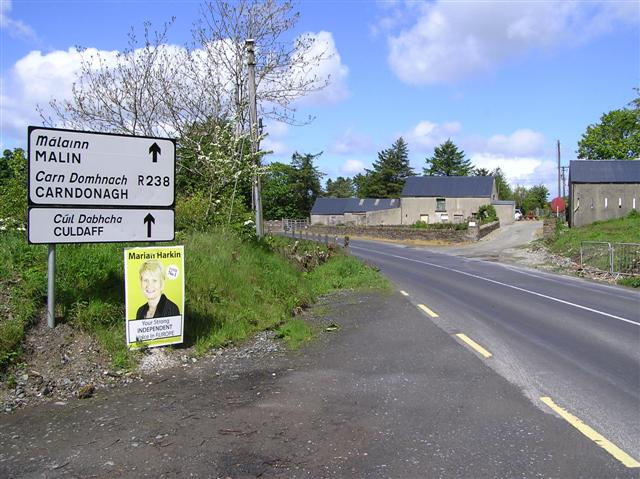
- R238 at Moville, County Donegal

Route information
- Length: 88.1 km (54.7 mi)

Major junctions
- From: N13 at Bridge End, County Donegal
- R239 at Burnfoot; R244 at Drumfree; R244 at Carndonagh; R240 at Carndonagh; R242 at Drumaville; R243 at Templemoyle; R241 at Moville; R240 at Quigley's Point; R239 at Muff, County Donegal
- To: County Londonderry border at Liberty Bridge

Location
- Country: Ireland
- Primary destinations: Burnfoot; Buncrana; Carndonagh; Culdaff; Moville; Redcastle; Quigley's Point; Muff

Highway system
- Roads in Ireland; Motorways; Primary; Secondary; Regional

The R238 road is a regional road in Ireland. It is a ring road around the Inishowen Peninsula in County Donegal. The R238 is also part of the main road from Derry to Buncrana. Sections of the road form part of the Wild Atlantic Way. In July 2010, the road was the site of Ireland's worst road crash resulting in eight deaths.

The R238 travels north from the N13 at Bridge End. The road travels along Lough Swilly to reach Buncrana. From there the road proceeds inland to Carndonagh. After Carndonagh, the road goes to meet the Lough Foyle coast at Moville. From Moville the road proceeds southwest to end at the County Londonderry border just past Muff. The R238 is 88.1 km (54.7 mi) long.

== See also ==
- Roads in Ireland
- July 2010 R238 traffic collision
