= Carndonagh =

Town in County Donegal, Ireland

Carndonagh Carn Domhnach
- Town
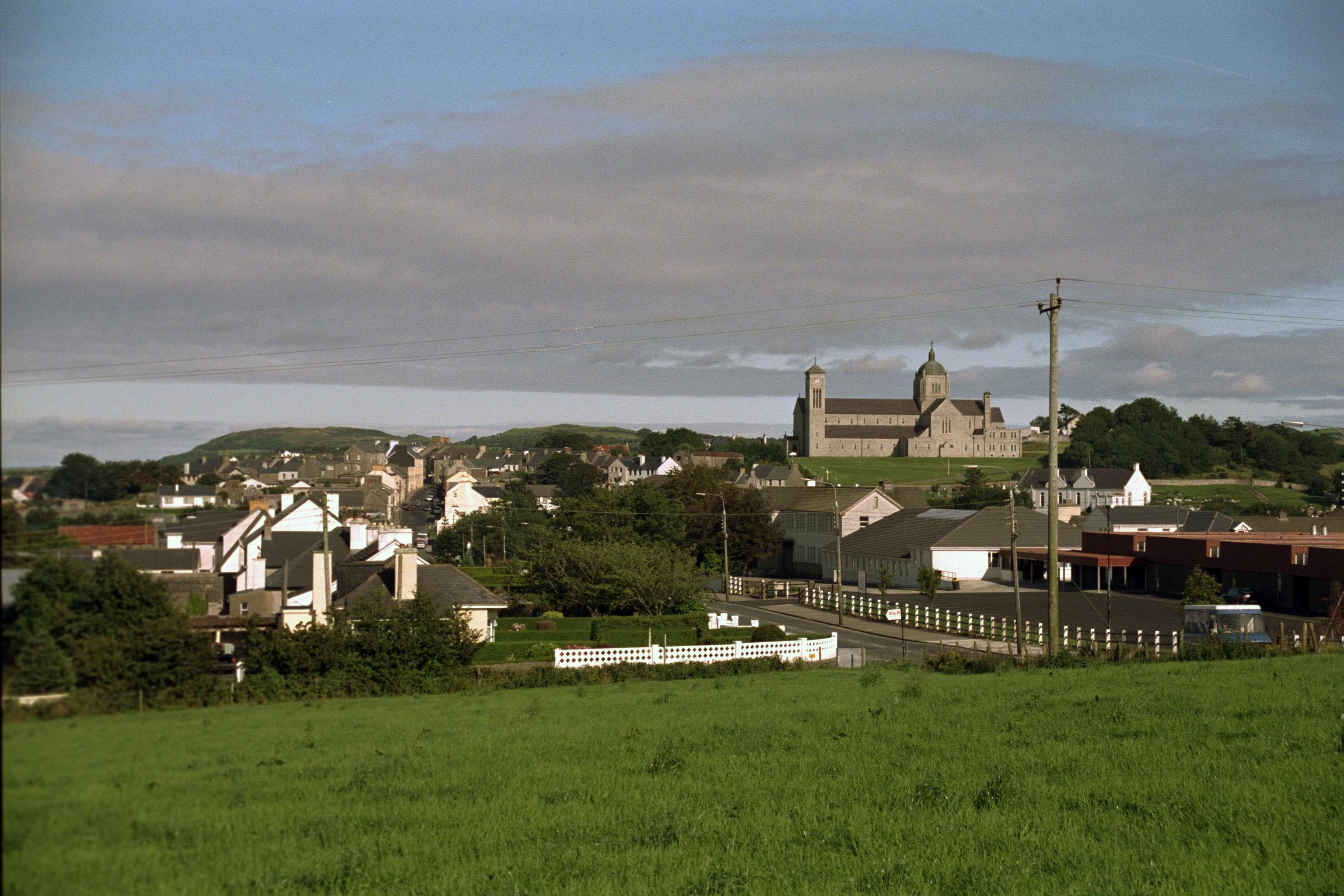

- Location in Ireland
- Coordinates: 55°15′04″N 7°15′42″W
- Country: Ireland
- Province: Ulster
- County: County Donegal
- Dáil Éireann: Donegal
- EU Parliament: Midlands–North-West
- Elevation: 32 m (105 ft)

Population (2022)
  - Total: 2,768
- Eircode routing key: F93
- Telephone area code: +353(0)74
- Irish Grid Reference: C467453

Carndonagh (karn-DUN-ah; Irish: Carn Domhnach, meaning 'cairn or mound of the church') is a town on the Inishowen peninsula in County Donegal, Ireland, close to Trawbreaga Bay. As of the 2022 census, Carndonagh had a population of 2,768.

== History ==
The town is the site of the Carndonagh stones, a series of five sculpted stones which are dated to between the 7th and 9th centuries. Other evidence of ancient settlement in the area includes a number of ringfort, souterrain, chambered cairn and standing stone sites in the townlands of Ballylosky, Churchland Quarters and Tullanree.

Carndonagh's Church of Ireland (Anglican) church was built c. 1769, the Weslyan (Methodist) chapel dates to 1867, the Presbyterian church to 1886, and the Catholic church (built on the site of a smaller 19th-century chapel) was completed in 1945.

Carndonagh railway station, which opened in July 1907, was closed in December 1935.

== Amenities ==
The town is laid out around a central square, or 'diamond', and is dominated by its Romanesque Revival Catholic chapel. It is home to 6 national schools including St. Patrick's GNS and BNS, Glentogher NS, Craigtown NS, Donagh NS, St. Bridget's NS and Carndonagh Community School, formerly the largest community school in the Republic of Ireland. Carndonagh is also home to a number of musical groups.

== Transport ==
TFI Local Link, runs a number of public transport routes for the area: 952 (Carndonagh/Derry), 954 (Carndonagh/Malin Head), 955 (Buncrana/Carndonagh), 2529 (Quigley's Point/Carndonagh), 7748 (Shrove/Carndonagh) and 7749 (Redcastle/Carndonagh).

There are private coach services from the town to Derry and Dublin.

Carndonagh is on the R238, R240 and R244 regional roads.

== Sport ==
The local Gaelic Athletic Association (GAA) club, Carndonagh GAA, fields Gaelic football teams in the AllSportStore.com Division 4 championship.

Carndonagh F.C., the local association football (soccer) club, participates in the Inishowen Football League.

== People ==
- Roy Campbell (1901–1957), South African poet, who explored the legacy of his Carndonagh ancestors in the 1952 memoir Light on a Dark Horse
- John Wallace Crawford (1847–1917), adventurer, educator, and author
- Gary Doherty (born 1980), footballer Norwich City
- John Pitt Kennedy (1796–1879), engineer
- Paul Lynch (born 1977), writer
- Keith McErlean, actor
- Tommy Tiernan (born 1969), comedian

== Gallery ==
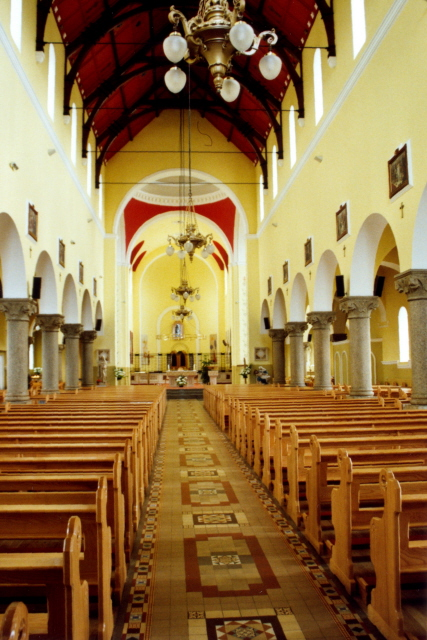
Sacred Heart Catholic Church, which replaced the 1826-built Roman Catholic Chapel in 1945

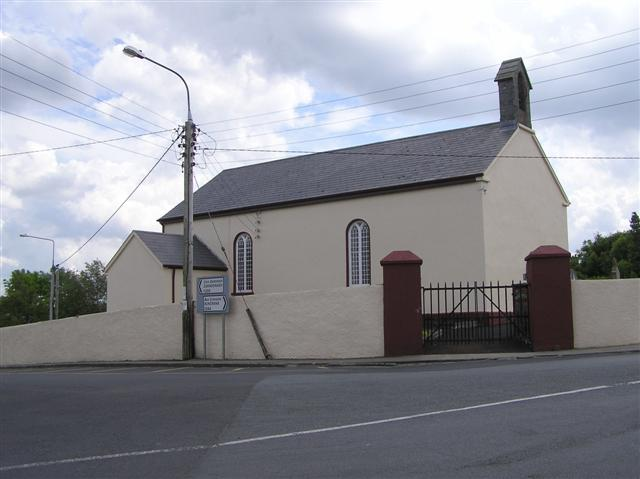
Carndonagh Church of Ireland church

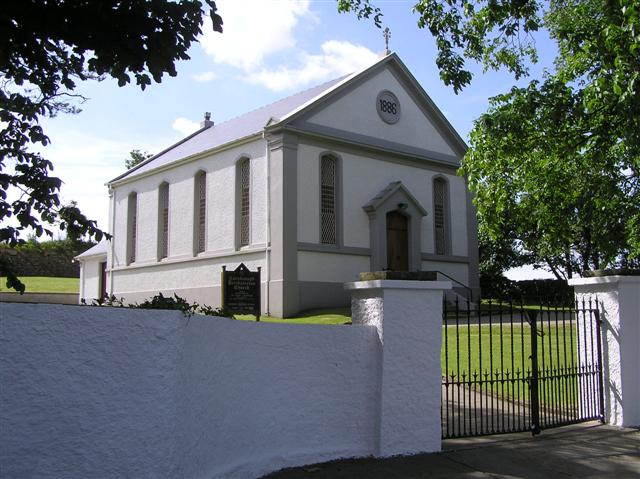
Carndonagh Presbyterian church

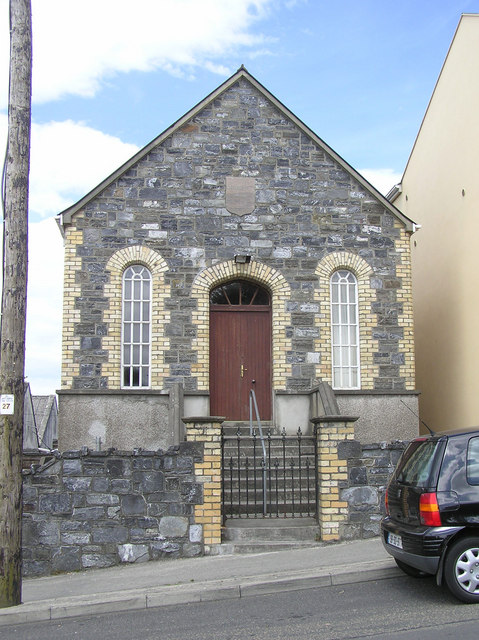
Carndonagh Methodist church

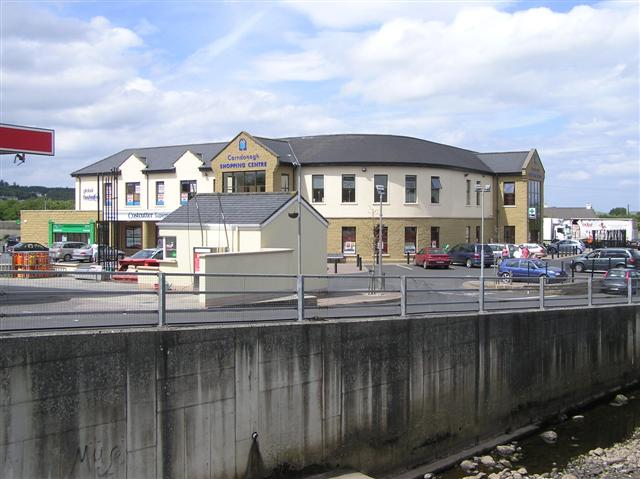
Carndonagh Shopping Centre

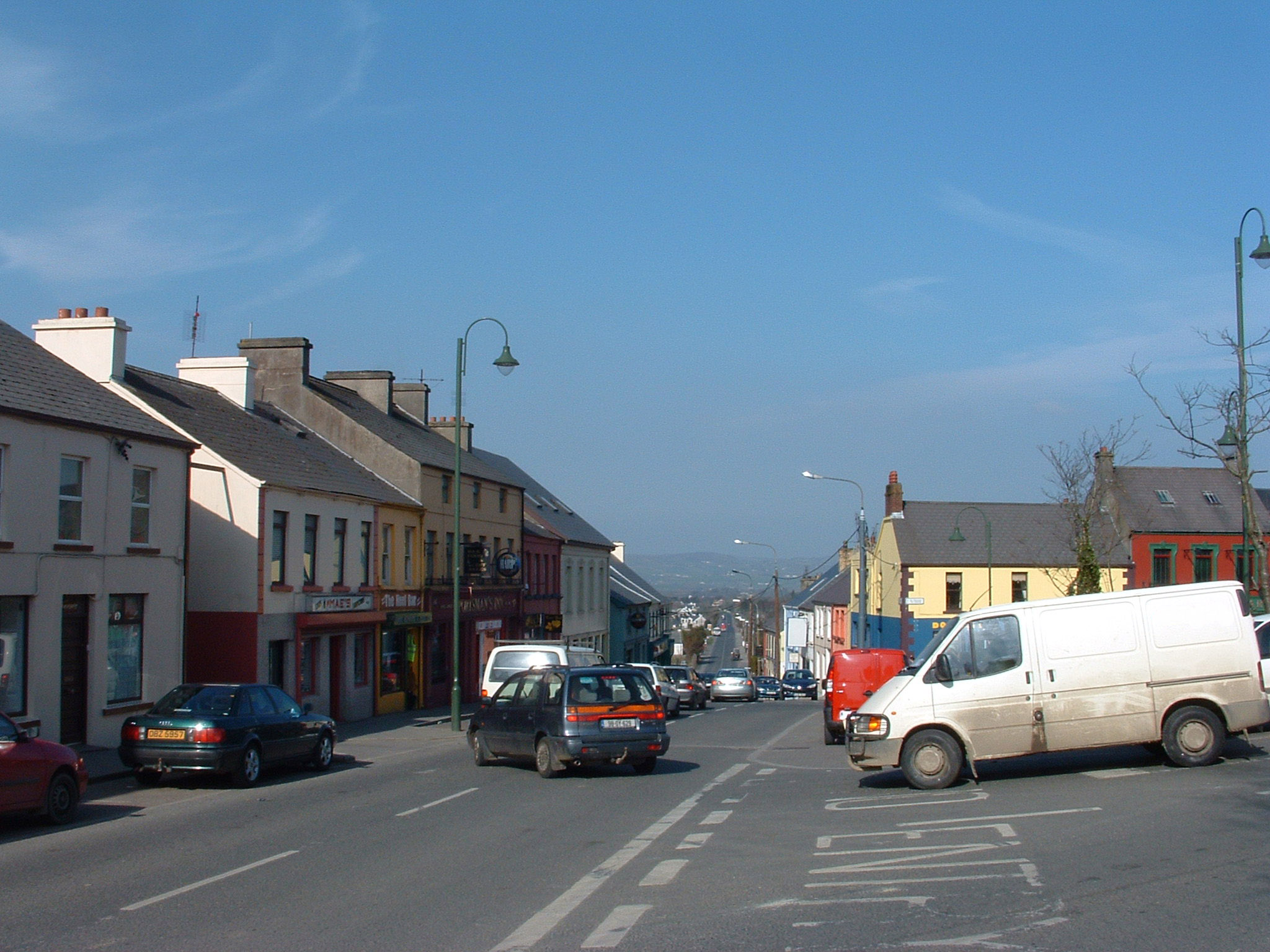
Town centre (The Diamond)

== See also ==
- List of towns and villages in Ireland
