= Londonderry Port =

Dock and shipyards in Northern Ireland

Coordinates: 55.042°N 7.263°W

Foyle Port
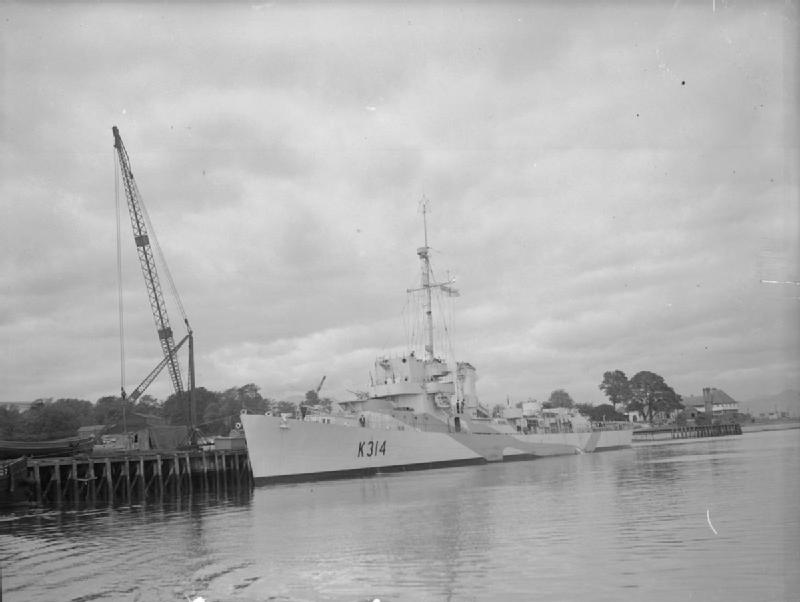
- The frigate HMS Bentinck docked at Lisahally.
- Interactive map of Foyle Port

Location
- Country: United Kingdom
- Location: Derry, Northern Ireland
- UN/LOCODE: GBLDY

Details
- Operated by: Londonderry Port & Harbour Commissioners
- Owned by: Department for Infrastructure
- No. of berths: 5
- Draft depth: 9.3 m (31 ft)

Londonderry Port, now operating as Foyle Port, is a port located on Lough Foyle in Northern Ireland. It is the United Kingdom’s most westerly port and an important northerly port on the island of Ireland. The current port is at Lisahally, County Londonderry, though historically the port was upriver in the city of Derry itself. It is operated by the Londonderry Port and Harbour Commissioners, whose former offices, just north of the city's walls, are now a museum.

== History ==
The River Foyle has been an entryport since before the time of Saint Columba, and was used by the Vikings and the Normans. At the time the river was wider and more shallow, and as ships grew larger, they would anchor close in to shore and unload by lighter. The planting of the walled city on the west bank of the Foyle necessitated a more efficient approach, and the port of Londonderry was created in 1664 by the charter granted by King Charles II to the Londonderry Corporation making them responsible for its regulation and upkeep. The corporation caused a quay to be built into the river for loading and unloading; this was the Shipquay, downhill from the city, giving rise to Shipquay Street and the Shipquay Gate.

By the end of the 18th century the city had its first bridge across the river, a new quay, and the shoreline below the Water Bastion had been reclaimed. It was reported that in 1771 that the merchants of the city owned 67 ships, with a capacity of 11,000 tons.

By 1835 wharves extended from the shipquay back to the bridge, on the slob lands (alluvial deposits) south of the city. By the 1840s the port had a thriving shipbuilding business and was known for building clipper ships, though shipbuilding at the port declined after the introduction of iron vessels, and no large ships were built for some decades after 1846.

Londonderry Port and Harbour Act 1854
- Act of Parliament
- Parliament of the United Kingdom
- Long title: An Act to consolidate the several Acts relating to the Port and Harbour of Londonderry; for the Improvement of the Navigation of the Lough and River of Lough Foyle; and to authorize the Construction of a uniform Line of Quays, Docks, and other Works.
- Citation: 17 & 18 Vict. c. clxxvii

Dates
- Royal assent: 24 July 1854

Text of statute as originally enacted

The Londonderry Port and Harbour Commissioners were established by the Londonderry Port and Harbour Act 1854 (17 & 18 Vict. c. clxxvii) to manage the port and oversee its expansion. The commissioners were also given full control of the waterways from the city to the mouth of Lough Foyle, allowing for strategic planning of the port.

An 1868 report describing the city's expansion mentioned the expenditure on the port: New docks and quays built (at a cost of £126,500), a new graving dock (£25,000), flats deepened (£7,000) leading to an expansion in trade of all kinds. Of coastal traffic the total tonnage handled in 1857 had been 148,291 t (for steamers), and 45,676 t (sailing ships); in 1867 it was 134,368 t and 67,304 t respectively. In foreign trade, 1857 saw 27,637 t entering the port; in 1867 it was 40,397 t, while in 1857 transatlantic traffic was non-existent; by 1867 it had grown to 258,086 t. The total trade figures for port were given as 221,604 t, in 1857, compared to 500,373 t ten years later. The Foyle Shipyard, founded in 1882, brought shipbuilding back to the port, but it ceased trading in 1892.

By the 1920s the port boasted two miles of quays, with warehouses, stationary and mobile cranes, and with railways along the entire length connected to the four rail systems serving the city. The port had regular cross-channel services to Great Britain, and steamer services to North America. The Commissioners ensured the channel was dredged and well marked, and also maintained a pilot station at Inishowen Head, and a roadstead at Moville, which was a port of call for transatlantic steamers carrying mail.

The port had its own railway yard, under the control of the Londonderry Port and Harbour Commissioners (LPHC). This railway had connections to the other railways in Derry; The Great Northern and the Northern Counties Committee, both of which were 5ft3 gauge, and thanks to a length of dual gauge, the County Donegal Railways Joint Committee and Londonderry and Lough Swilly Railway, which were 3 ft. Wagons could be shunted across the Foyle by way of the lower deck of the Craigavon Bridge, which was dual gauge. Two of the LPHC locomotives survived into preservation- No. 1, which is at the Ulster Folk and Transport Museum in Cultra, and No. 3, which is owned by the Railway Preservation Society of Ireland at Whitehead.

The port saw the transport of many goods over the centuries. Seed potatoes were shipped to places as far away as Egypt. Cattle were regularly shipped to and from Glasgow by the Burns and Laird steamer until the late 1960s. Manufactured items including linen, linoleum and shirts were exported to Great Britain for onward distribution. The McCorkell Line sailed from here.

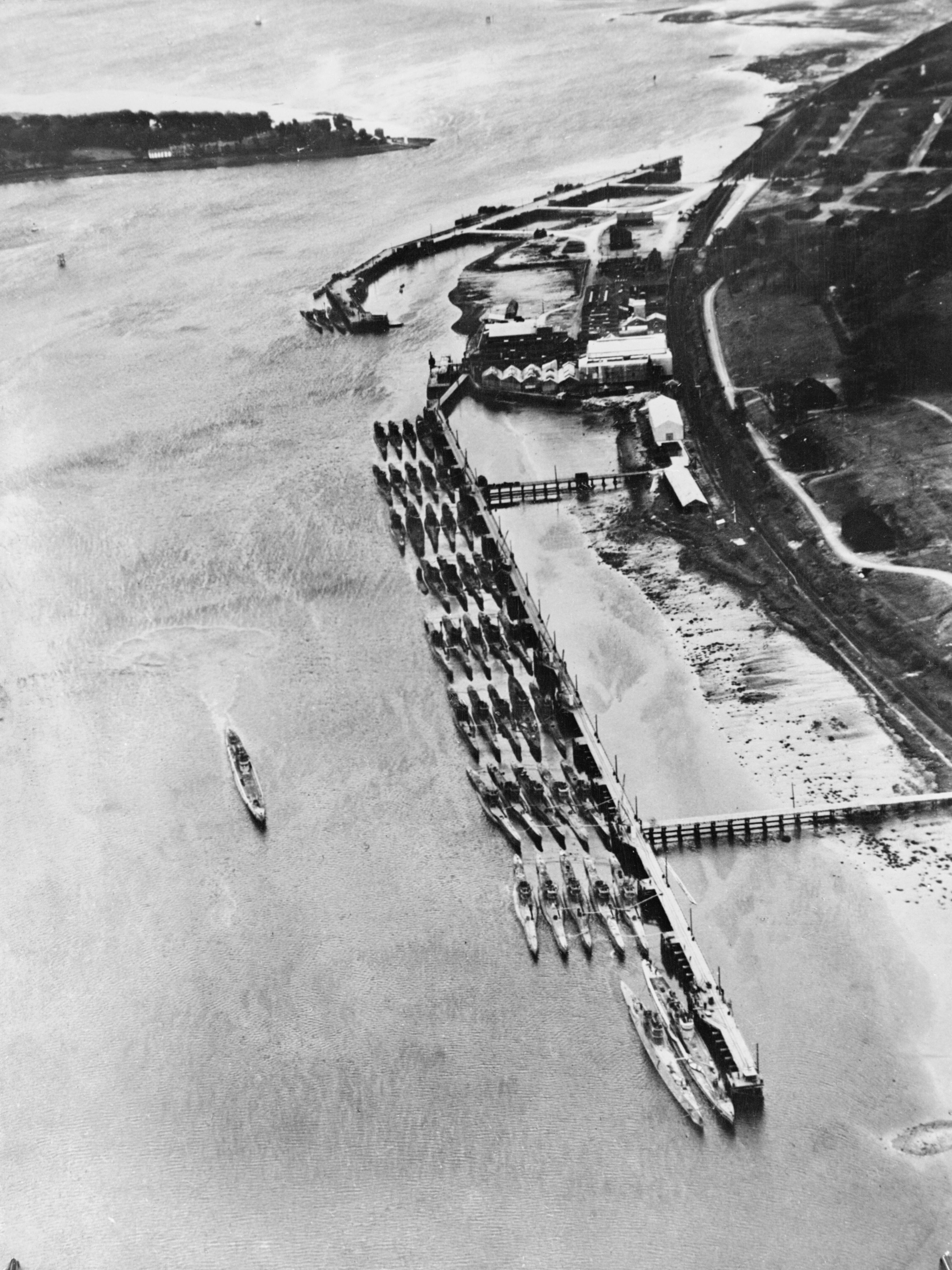
Surrendered German U-boats moored at Lisahally

The outbreak of the Second World War, and the German campaign against Allied shipping, saw the establishment of a naval base, HMS Ferret on the Foyle, with the use of port facilities in the city, and the building of new quays at Lisahally, at the mouth of the river where it enters the lough. Londonderry Port and the docks at Lisahally gave vital service to the Allies in the longest running campaign of the Second World War, the Battle of the Atlantic. This ended with the surrender of the German U-boat fleet at Lisahally on 14 May 1945. About a dozen boats came alongside for that official surrender, taken by Admiral Sir Max Horton in the presence of US, Canadian and Republic of Ireland commanders; the other U-boats arrived over the next several weeks. Eventually all were dispatched to sea and sunk.

The waterfront area of the city was redeveloped in the 1990s. The cattle-holding pens that used to be near where the current British Telecom building stands were demolished along with the transit sheds in order to create a new road and car parking along the banks of the River Foyle. This and with the need for deep water moorings for larger vessels saw the port moved to the docks at Lisahally in 1993. These docks were originally used by DuPont to import raw materials for their manufacturing process and by the nearby Coolkeeragh power station to import fuel oil for their turbines.

In 1995 the port welcomed the cruise ship Southern Cross, with 800 passengers, the first to visit for 40 years.

== Foyle Port ==
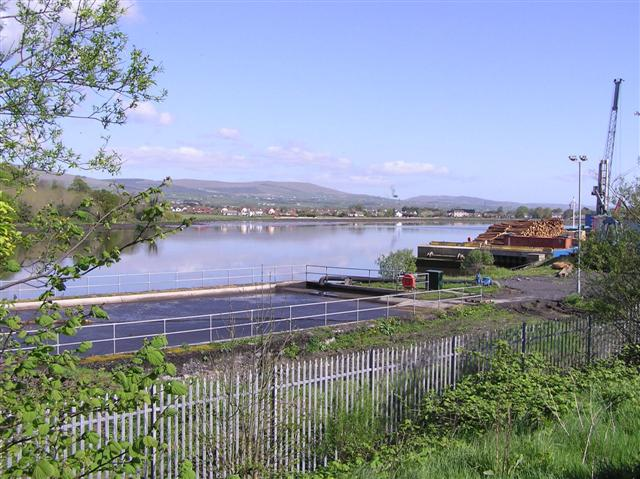
The southern edge of Lisahally Docks

In recent years Londonderry Port and Harbour Commissioners have established a number of diversified trading divisions marketed under the "Foyle" brand:

- Foyle Port incorporates the main cargo handling and general port operations;
- Foyle Marine Services handles the harbour dredging and towage services as well as offering marine services externally to other ports;
- Foyle Consulting Engineers provided structural and civil engineering services;
- Foyle Engineering offers a steel fabrication service.

Lisahally Terminal has 440 metres (1,440 ft) of quay and can facilitate vessels up to 62,000 GT. Primarily a bulk port and major importer of oil, coal, animal feed, fertiliser and plywood the port also accepts cruise ships at the city centre berths, at its commercial port at Lisahally as well as the tender port of Greencastle.

In July 2003 Foyle Port installed the first of its two permanent pontoons referred to as the Foyle Port Marina in the heart of the city. The marina facility consists of a 200 metres (660 ft)-long wooden structure (south), later a second pontoon was established close by adding a 140-metre (460 ft) concrete structure (north). Overall, the Foyle Port Marina offers more than 600 metres (2,000 ft) of secure, deep-water berthing.

== General information ==
Most of the current Londonderry Port is in the townland of Lisahally (or Lissahawley), a toponym that may be derived from Irish Lios a' Chalaidh 'ringfort of the landing place'.

The port has witnessed mass emigration of Irish and Scots-Irish people over the centuries to North America, Scotland, England and Australia.

Lisahally F.C., which is based at the village of Strathfoyle, was founded by port workers from Lisahally.

== Arms ==
Coat of arms of the Londonderry Port and Harbour Commission

Notes
Confirmed 9 February 1858 by Sir John Bernard Burke, Ulster King of Arms.
Crest
A lighthouse standing on a rock Proper.
Torse
Of the colours.
Escutcheon
Or on a cross Gules a tower Proper on a chief Argent the representation of the entrance to a harbour and a ship with three masts sailing on all also Proper.
Supporters
Two dragons with wings expanded Proper each charged on the shoulder with a tower also Proper.
Motto
In Portu Quies

== See also ==
- HMS Ferret (1940 shore establishment)
