= Strabane Canal =

Canal in County Tyrone, Northern Ireland

Coordinates: 54°52′0″N 7°26′39″W

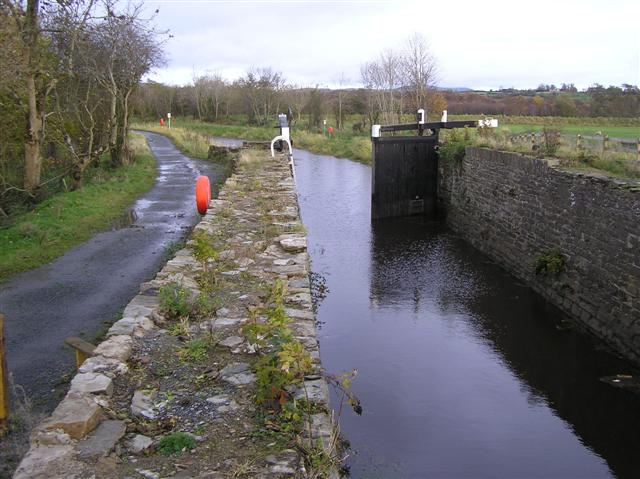
- The restored Devine's Lock

Specifications
- Length: 6.5 km (4.0 miles)
- Locks: 2
- Status: part restored

History
- Date of act: 1791
- Date of first use: 1796
- Date closed: 1962

Geography
- Start point: Strabane
- End point: Porthall
- Connects to: River Foyle

The Strabane Canal is a short (6.5 km) canal in County Tyrone, Northern Ireland. It connected the market town of Strabane to the navigable River Foyle and from there to Londonderry Port on the north coast of Ireland. The canal opened in 1796 and closed in 1962.

== History ==
The Strabane Canal was conceived by The 1st Marquess of Abercorn as a way of encouraging industrial and commercial development in Strabane and its immediate surroundings, most of which was within his estates.

An act of Parliament was obtained in 1791 to authorise the construction of the 6.4-kilometre (4.0 mi) canal, although the land required for the canal was bought by the Marquess's agents by agreement with the owners, and the project, which cost £11,858, was privately funded by the Marquess, assisted by a loan of £3,703 from the Irish Parliament. The canal ran from the tidal waters of Lough Foyle at Leck, some 16 kilometres (9.9 mi) upstream from Derry, to Strabane. It left the Foyle just above its junction with the Burndennet River, to enter Crampsie's Lock. The main water supply was from a burn which entered the canal above Devine's Lock, the only other lock built.

Construction began in late 1791, with John Whally of Coleraine acting as engineer, after the plans had been inspected by Richard Owen, then working on the extension of the Lagan Canal from Lisburn to Lough Neagh. Most of the canal was completed within a year, but construction of the locks and the junction with the Foyle took much longer, and was finally finished in 1795. An official opening took place on 21 March 1796, amidst great celebrations. The "respectable inhabitants" ate at The Abercorn Arms, and proposed many toasts, while ale was supplied to the general populace, and there were bonfires and illuminations.

=== Operation ===
The locks were designed to accommodate sea-going schooners, capable of carrying 300 tons of cargo. Devine's Lock was 108 by 23 feet (32.9 by 7.0 m), with 7 feet (2.1 m) of water over the cill, while Crampsie's Lock was 117 by 24 feet (35.7 by 7.3 m), with a depth of 6.5 feet (2.0 m). Tolls were collected by the Marquess's agents, at a flat rate of two shillings (10p) per ton. An upstream trade in coal, timber, hardware and foodstuffs developed, although there was dissatisfaction with the tolls, which were considered by the merchants to be too high and unreasonable. Traffic from Strabane to Derry developed more slowly, but a trade in agricultural produce gradually increased. Lighters were towed by a steam tug to the entrance of the canal, while horses provided the power for the journey up to Strabane.

From 1820, a group of local people leased the canal from the then young 2nd Marquess of Abercorn (who later became The 1st Duke of Abercorn), and continued to run it successfully. 583 lighters made the journey between Strabane and Derry in 1836, carrying a total of 10,535 tons, most of which was grain. A number of warehouses, grain stores and wharves were built along the banks at Strabane. The canal brought considerable prosperity to Strabane and to Lifford in the first quarter of the nineteenth century and the towns became flourishing markets for agricultural produce. However, in 1847 the Londonderry and Enniskillen Railway opened from Derry to Strabane, which was extended to Omagh in 1852, and a network of connecting railways soon developed. The effect it had on the canal was dramatic, and the canal was soon in financial difficulties. The canal company which had leased the canal for the last 40 years was wound up in 1860, to be replaced by the Strabane Steam Navigation Company. Although traffic remained at about 20,000 tons until the end of the century, this generated between £2,000 and £3,000 of income, and by the time operating costs and the lease were paid, the net annual revenue was always below £300. The new company was also wound up, to be replaced by the Strabane Canal Company in 1890, who took out a 31-year lease at £300 per year.

The Railway and Canal Traffic Act 1888 had made it compulsory for every public company to notify the Board of Trade of their rates and charges. The Board of Trade had powers to set new rates if they did not approve of the existing rates. The Strabane Canal Company argued that it was a private company, and therefore exempt from the act, while The 2nd Duke of Abercorn, who owned the canal, appealed to the House of Lords. Lieutenant-Colonel Addison was duly despatched from the Board of Trade to inspect the canal and the affairs of the company in 1898. Despite local allegations that the canal was unnavigable, and the findings of Addison that the east bank needed to be strengthened, the channel was shallow in places, and the gates needed to be repaired, he ruled that the canal was still navigable. However, the operating company was deemed to be a public company, to whom the 1888 act applied, and the tonnage rate was reduced to 6d (2.5p) per ton by the Board of Trade, one quarter of the rate that had previously been charged.

=== Decline ===
Conditions continued to decline. The water was less than 2 feet (0.61 m) deep along much of the canal, as over 2 miles (3.2 km) of the east bank required repairs to make it watertight, and the lock gates leaked. Shoals and sandbanks had developed in the Foyle below the entrance to the canal, as a result of the failure of the Derry authorities to dredge the channel. Whereas coasters had been able to reach Strabane in the early years of the canal, this was no longer possible, since the construction of the Carlisle Bridge in Derry in the 1860s and a bridge carrying the narrow gauge Donegal Railway over the canal below Strabane Basin. Previously, the only bridges over the canal had been two wooden swing bridges, which allowed the passage of boats with masts or funnels. Despite the fact that lighters could only complete the journey if half full, trade continued, with Smyth's grain mill generating up to half the trade. By the basin, there were two saw mills, a tannery, a brewery and repair shops and docks which were used to service the lighters. A little further down, coal was unloaded to supply the gas works, where a jetty had been built into the canal.

When the narrow gauge railway had been opened in 1900, it had been expected to provide competition for the existing line, but in practice, the two companies agreed rates, because the canal was still offering some competition. In 1910, carriage of foodstuffs and manure was still cheaper by water, and the canal basin was much nearer the town centre than the railway station. James McFarland, who had been the principal shareholder in the canal company since 1890, died around this time, and the lack of good management led to further decline. In 1912, the canal was bought from the Duke by the Strabane and Foyle Navigation Company Limited. The main shareholder was William Smyth, who owned the mill at Strabane, but despite attempts to improve the navigable depth of the canal, and the acquisition of a steam tug to tow the barges along the canal, traffic did not recover, and ceased in the early 1930s. Attempts were made to abandon the canal from 1944, and the section between Strabane and the swing bridge at Dysert was finally abandoned in 1962. The rest officially remained open.

== Failed Restoration Attempt ==
In June 2006 the Strabane Lifford Development Commission paid for a £1.3m cross-border waterways restoration contract. The project was launched by President of Ireland, Mary McAleese, in Lifford and intended to restore the 2.4 km (1.5 mi) of canal and two locks to working order.

The two sets of locks were restored but the construction work on the canal channel was of a poor standard. The council has refused to maintain the restored section of canal in its present state, and it has begun to deteriorate again.

== See also ==
- Canals of Ireland
- Canals of the United Kingdom

== Bibliography ==
- McCutcheon, W A (1965). The Canals of the North of Ireland. David and Charles. ISBN 0-7153-4028-X.

=== References ===
- BBC Schools - Canals
- Belfast Telegraph, 26 June 2006
