= Roma McLaughlin =

Irish footballer (born 1998)

Personal information
- Date of birth: 6 March 1998 (age 28)
- Place of birth: Greencastle, County Donegal, Ireland
- Height: 5 ft 5 in (1.65 m)
- Position: Midfielder

Team information
- Current team: Galway United
- Number: 14

Youth career
- 2012–2015: Moville Celtic Fc

College career
| Years | Team | Apps | (Gls) |
| 2018–2022 | Central Connecticut Blue Devils | 75 | (28) |

Senior career*
| Years | Team | Apps | (Gls) |
| 2015–2016 | Peamount United | | |
| 2017–2018 | Shelbourne | | (11) |
| 2023 | Fortuna Hjørring | 3 | (0) |
| 2024–2025 | Shelbourne | 27 | (3) |
| 2026 | Athlone Town | 0 | (0) |
| 2026– | Galway United | 1 | (0) |

International career^{‡}
| 2016– | Republic of Ireland | 11 | (0) |
- * Club domestic league appearances and goals as of 15:02, 10 January 2023 (UTC) ‡ National team caps and goals as of 12 April 2023

Roma McLaughlin (born 6 March 1998) is an Irish footballer who plays as a midfielder for Galway United and has appeared for the Republic of Ireland women's national team.

== Club career ==
=== Youth career ===
McLaughlin played during her youth career with Greencastle United in Greencastle, County Donegal, until 2015. In 2013, Mclaughlin helped Moville Community College win the National Cup for Schools.

=== Peamount United ===
McLaughlin played for Peamount United for two seasons, joining for the 2015–16 season. In 2015, she was selected as the WNL Young Player of the Year. During the shortened 2016 season, McLaughlin played well again, being nominated for the WNL Young Player of the Year award again. In both seasons she was selected for the Team of the Year.

=== Shelbourne ===
McLaughlin joined Shelbourne in January 2017. In her first season with the club, she scored 11 goals. She then re-signed with the club ahead of the 2018 season. In July 2018, McLaughlin was nominated for the Continental Tyres Women's National League Player of the Month award.

=== Fortuna Hjørring ===
In January 2023 McLaughlin signed an 18-month professional contract with Danish Kvindeligaen club Fortuna Hjørring.

=== Shelbourne ===
She rejoined Shelbourne ahead of the 2024 season she spent two seasons at the club winning the 2024 Women's FAI Cup.

=== Galway United ===
After departing Shelbourne she joined league champions Athlone Town with the club announcing her signing on the 31st of January, Not long after on the 10th of March a week before the new season began she joined Galway United ahead of their season, without playing a single competitive match for Athlone.

== College career ==
In September 2018, McLaughlin moved to the United States, joining Central Connecticut Blue Devils, the athletics division of Central Connecticut State University in New Britain, Connecticut. In her first season, she scored two goals in 18 games. She was selected twice for the Northeast Conference (NEC) Rookie of the Week and at the end of the season was selected for the 2018 Northeast Conference All-Rookie Team and was awarded the 2018 Northeast Conference Rookie of the Year award. In her second season, she helped the team win the NEC title. She was named as the 2019 NEC Midfielder of the Year. In December 2019, McLaughlin was named to the women's soccer All-America team, making her the first player from the Central Connecticut Blue Devils named to an All-America team.

== International career ==
McLaughlin has been capped for the Republic of Ireland national team. She made her debut in 2016, making two appearances. In 2017, McLaughlin was called up for Republic of Ireland's 2017 Cyprus Women's Cup squad. In the Cyprus Cup, she came on as an 80th-minute substitute in the 2–0 victory over Czech Republic. In the second match, a scoreless draw against Hungary, she started the match and played 73 minutes. McLaughlin has also appeared for the team during the 2019 FIFA Women's World Cup qualifying cycle.

McLaughlin also represented Republic of Ireland's under-19 team, playing in the 2017 UEFA Women's Under-19 Championship 1st qualifying round, in which Ireland beat Macedonia, Italy, and Wales. In March 2017, she was awarded the 2016 International Under-19 Woman's Player of the Year award during the Football Association of Ireland's International Football Awards.

=== International appearances ===
Appearances and goals by national team and year
| National team | Year | Apps |
|---|---|---|
| Republic of Ireland | 2016 | 3 |
| Republic of Ireland | 2017 | 3 |
| Republic of Ireland | 2018 | 1 |
| Republic of Ireland | 2021 | 2 |
| Republic of Ireland | 2022 | 1 |
| Republic of Ireland | 2023 | 1 |
| Total | | 11 |

== Personal life ==
McLaughlin went to school at Moville Community College.
