= Redcastle, County Donegal =

Village in County Donegal, Ireland

Redcastle Carraig Mhic Uidhilín
- Village
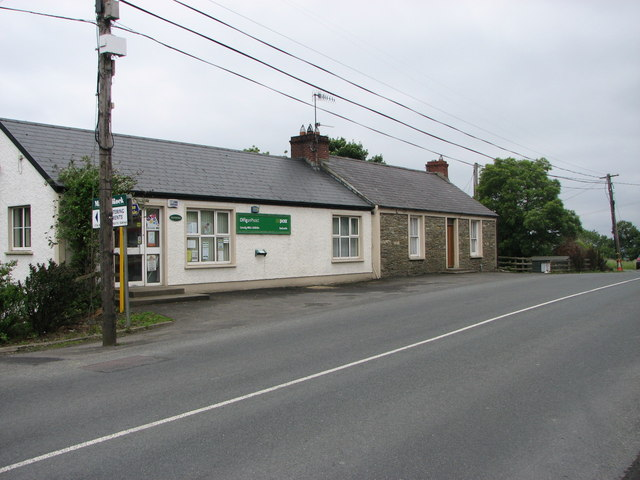
- Redcastle post office

- Location in Ireland
- Coordinates: 55°07′30″N 7°11′50″W
- Country: Ireland
- Province: Ulster
- County: County Donegal
- Elevation: 30 m (98 ft)
- Time zone: UTC+0 (WET)
  - Summer (DST): UTC-1 (IST (WEST))
- Irish Grid Reference: C648397

Redcastle (Irish: Carraig Mhic Uidhilín) is a village in County Donegal, Ireland, located on the eastern shores of Inishowen and overlooking Lough Foyle. It is in the townland of Carrickmaquigley, which is an anglicisation of its Irish name. To the south is the city of Derry and to the north lie the villages of Moville and Greencastle.

== See also ==
- List of towns and villages in Ireland
