= Cabry River =

River in County Donegal, Ireland

Coordinates: 55°07′31″N 7°11′22″W

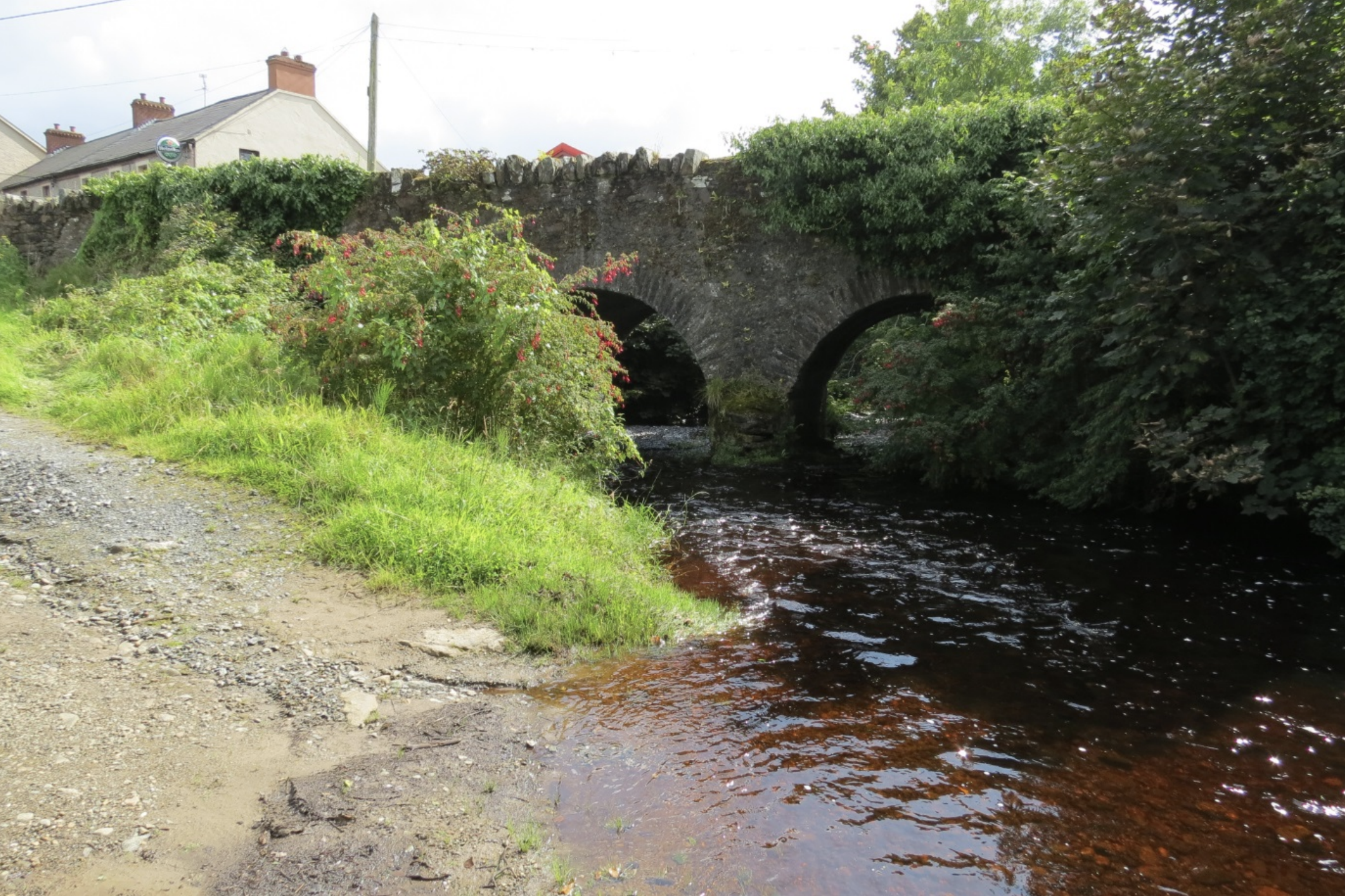
- Cabry River in Quigley’s Point

Location
- Country: Ireland
- County: County Donegal

Physical characteristics
- Mouth: Lough Foyle
  - location: Quigley's Point, County Donegal

The Cabry River is located in north County Donegal, Ireland. It flows into Lough Foyle after passing under the late-18th century bridge at Quigley's Point, known locally as "Carrowkeel". The mouth of the river is in Quigley's Point, a village within the nearby townlands of Cabry, Carrowkeel, Gortanny, Magheralahan, and Meenavanaghan, all in County Donegal.

The river is known for its deposits of alluvial gold, which have been found in gravel bars in the lower course of the river and are believed to have originated from a local gold mineralization source. The Cabry River's gold deposits also contain silver, lead, nickel, and bismuth-telluride, as well as galena, pyrite, and chalcopyrite. The river flows over Dalradian Supergroup bedrock, as well as glacial debris and Carboniferous age bedrock in its lower course. The occurrence of alluvial gold in the Cabry River has been reported since at least 1935 and the site is considered an important County Geological Site and may be recommended for designation as a Geological National Heritage Area.
