= Northburgh Castle =

Ruined castle in County Donegal, Ireland

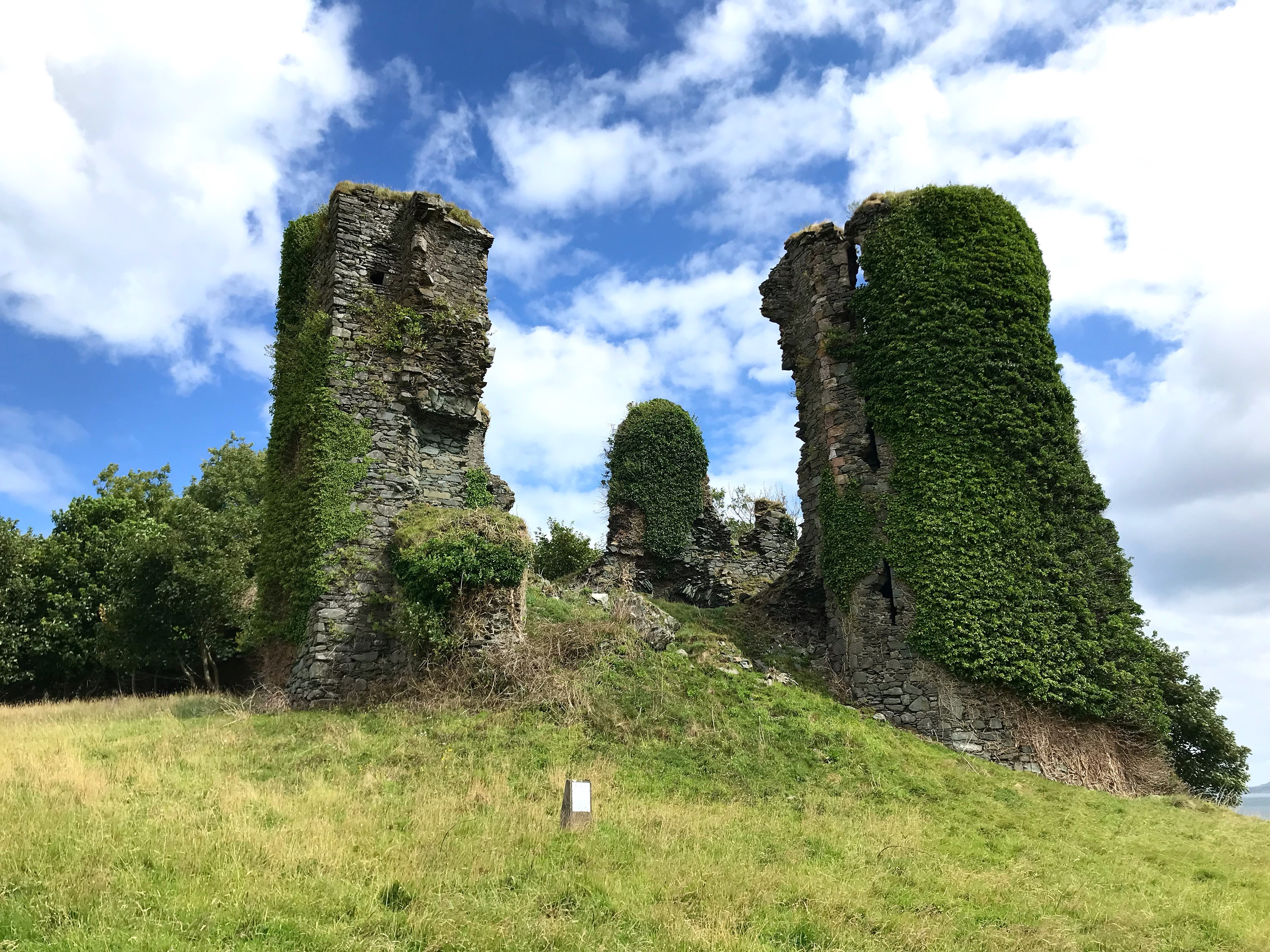

Northburgh Castle, also known as Green Castle or Greencastle Castle, is a ruined late 13th/early 14th-century castle in Greencastle, a village and fishing port in the north of Inishowen, County Donegal, on the north coast of Ireland. It was completed in 1305 by Richard Óg de Burgh, 2nd Earl of Ulster. Northburgh Castle was sited to control Lough Foyle, and to act as an enabler to de Burgh's plans for expansion. The rock outcrop/platform on which the castle is built was not big enough to incorporate the plans, so the gatehouse is below the main castle extents and has its first floor at the level of the main courtyard: the gate passage leads only to a small lower courtyard from which steps lead up to the main one. It was captured by Edward Bruce in 1316 who held the castle for two years until his death in 1318, after which it was recaptured by Richard. Walter Liath de Burgh was imprisoned in the castle in 1331 by his cousin (and Richard's Grandson) William Donn de Burgh, 3rd Earl of Ulster (the 'Brown Earl'), and died of starvation in February 1332. Anecdotally, that act is commemorated in the Derry City coat of arms as a skeleton. William's sister was found dead beneath the battlements. After William's death, the castle became a stronghold of the O'Doherty family.

The castle belongs to a typological group that incorporate the keep (or donjon: the great, usually defensive main, tower) in the outer defences (i.e. the curtain wall), rather than a standalone structure within the defensive walls. It consists of an oval enclosure with twin polygonal-towered gatehouse at one end and a more ruined large polygonal tower (added later: likely in the 15th century) at the other. McNeill draws parallels with the design (although not the scale) of Greencastle's gatehouse with the great Edward I castle of Harlech, Wales; with the rest of the castle construction drawing parallels with Caernarfon. The overall design, too, was influenced by its patron (Richard Óg de Burgh) who was close to Edward, and was knighted by him at Rhuddlan Castle. "The architectural references, especially the external appearance derived from Caernarvon, must represent a deliberate choice by Richard, associating himself with the crowning castle of Edward's conquest." This cross-pollination of architectural ideas between Wales and Ireland is widespread in the great castles: "Stylistic ideas were clearly moving between north-western Ireland and Wales in the late 1200s and early 1300s, as witness two baronial castles in Ireland – Ballintubber, County Roscommon and Greencastle, Co. Donegal."

The gatehouse is of a type that signifies a move away from castles in Ireland as purely military/defensive structures to symbols of power, centres of administration, places to launch further expansion in territory and as accommodation, whilst retaining their military capabilities. When describing the gatehouse at Northburgh (Greencastle), Sweetman states: "It was most commodious: it had considerable accommodation in the gate building, the north tower, the west tower and in the great hall which lay along the north wall between the two towers. The castle was comfortable and fashionable."

Northburgh Castle suffered considerable damage by cannon fire and eventually was left in ruins after the 17th century.

The castle remains under management of the Government of Ireland (Office of Public Works). There are two access points for the public, from the town and from the shore.
