= R244 road (Ireland) =

Road in Ireland

Coordinates: 55.239074°N 7.306413°W

R244 road
- Bóthar R244
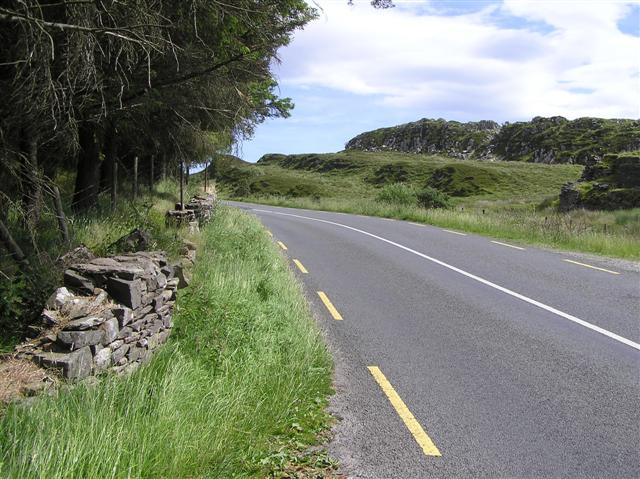
- R244 at Ballinglough

Route information
- Length: 11.1 km (6.9 mi)

Major junctions
- From: R238 Drumfries
- To: R240 Carndonagh

Location
- Country: Ireland

Highway system
- Roads in Ireland; Motorways; Primary; Secondary; Regional

The R244 road is a short regional road in Ireland, located in County Donegal.
