= R243 road (Ireland) =

Road in Ireland

Coordinates: 55.290447°N 7.228514°W

R243 road
- Bóthar R243

Route information
- Length: 3.2 km (2.0 mi)

Major junctions
- From: R242 Malin
- To: R238 Templemoyle Cross

Location
- Country: Ireland

Highway system
- Roads in Ireland; Motorways; Primary; Secondary; Regional

The R243 road is a short regional road in Ireland, located in County Donegal.
