= Quigley's Point =

Village in County Donegal, Ireland

Quigley's Point Rinn Uí Choigligh
- Village
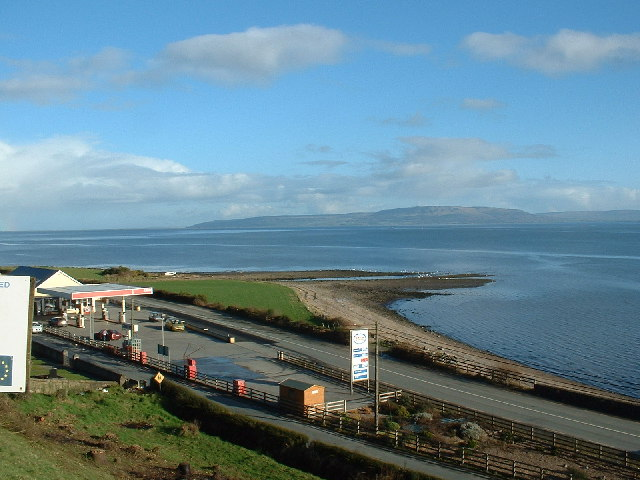
- Vance's Point, Quigley's Point

- Location in Ireland
- Coordinates: 55°07′30″N 7°11′50″W
- Country: Ireland
- Province: Ulster
- County: County Donegal

Population (2022)
  - Total: 213
- Time zone: UTC+0 (WET)
  - Summer (DST): UTC-1 (IST (WEST))
- Irish Grid Reference: C513310

Quigley's Point (Irish: Rinn Uí Choigligh) is a village in County Donegal, Ireland. Located on the eastern shores of Inishowen and overlooking Lough Foyle, the village is sometimes known locally as "Carrowkeel" (or "Carowkeel") as it is in a townland of that name. To the south is the city of Derry and to the north lie the villages of Moville and Greencastle. A car ferry links Greencastle with Magilligan during the summer. The river Cabry, which flows through the area, is spanned by a late-18th century bridge at Quigley's Point.

Evidence of ancient settlement in the area includes a standing stone site in Cabry townland, and a reputed former cromlech site (since removed) in Carrowkeel townland.

The Presbyterian Church in Ireland has a church at Greenbank near the village. Greenbank Presbyterian Church was built in 1862 in a "Gothic influenced" style. The nearby Presbyterian church hall, which was gutted by fire following an apparent arson attack in 2003, was subsequently restored.

Quigley's Point had a population of 213 people at the time of the 2022 census, down slightly from 227 in the 2011 census.

== See also ==
- Isle of Doagh
- List of towns and villages in Ireland
- U.S. Naval Air Station Lough Foyle Ireland
