= Moville Community College =

Coordinates: 55°15′2″N 7°15′43″W

Moville Community College Coláiste Pobail Bhun an Phobail
- Carrownaffe; Moville, County Donegal; Ireland

Information
- Religious affiliations: Multi-denominational, Primarily Catholic
- Opened: 2001
- Oversight: Donegal ETB
- School number: 76054L
- Principal: Caroline Doherty
- Staff: 60+
- Average class size: 24
- Website: movillecc.ie

Moville Community College is a secondary school based in Carrownaff, Moville, County Donegal, Ireland. It has approximately 700 students.

== Notable alumni ==
- Gemma McGuinness (b. 1995) - footballer; AFC Bournemouth
- Roma McLaughlin (b. 1998) - footballer; Fortuna Hjørring
