= 2010 R238 traffic collision =

Fatal road accident in Ireland

On 11 July 2010, eight people were killed when a black Volkswagen Passat collided with a red Toyota Corolla on the Buncrana to Clonmany section of the R238 road in County Donegal, Ireland. It was the deadliest road accident in the country since records began in 1961. The road at Glasmullen was not previously thought of as an accident blackspot. Seven of those who died watched the 2010 FIFA World Cup Final shortly before their deaths, while the eighth was returning home after playing bingo. The crash and the funerals, which took place over a three-day period, attracted both national and international attention. By comparison, the number of other people to die on the nation's roads that weekend was two.

== Crash ==
The Volkswagen Passat initially hit a white Renault Mégane on the narrow R238 road, leaving the female driver unhurt. A motorist had also flashed his lights in an attempt to warn the Passat to slow down. Then the Passat collided with the Toyota Corolla. Both ended up in a ditch.

Those killed came from Buncrana, Clonmany and Fahan. The Volkswagen Passat was occupied by eight men, aged between 19 and 23: Mark McLaughlin, aged 21; Paul Doherty, aged 19; Ciaran Sweeney, aged 19; PJ McLaughlin, aged 21; James McEleney, aged 23; Eamonn McDaid, aged 22, and Damien McLaughlin, aged 21, who all died. An eighth occupant, Shaun Kelly (the driver), was brought to Letterkenny General Hospital. The car had five seat belts between the eight men and some corpses were retrieved outside the vehicle. The crash occurred near the home of one of those who died. The Toyota Corolla was occupied by one man, 66-year-old Hugh Friel. He was taken to the same hospital and died there. He had been driving home from Buncrana after participating in a bingo session.

There was a delay in publishing the identities of those killed as some relatives were abroad, while others were at the Oxegen 2010 music festival in County Kildare. A press conference was held at Buncrana Garda Station on 12 July during which the identities of the dead were made public. Alcohol was ruled out as a cause of the accident. The R238 road was forensically examined, before being reopened on 13 July. Relatives inspected the crash scene and laid flowers before the road reopened. On 15 July, another appeal for witnesses was issued, though authorities also praised the "excellent co-operation" of members of the public.

== Victims ==
The crash killed eight men.

- Damien McLaughlin, aged 21
- Paul Doherty, aged 19
- Eamonn McDaid, aged 22
- Ciarán Sweeney, aged 19
- James McEleney, aged 23
- Mark McLaughlin, aged 21
- PJ "Mick" McLaughlin, aged 21
- Hugh Friel, aged 66

== Response ==
Assistant Garda Commissioner Kieran Kenny described it as the worst crash scene he had witnessed in 34 years in the force. A curate who visited the hospital said he too had never experienced anything like it in his time in the priesthood, describing scenes of upset which not only included relatives but also hospital staff. He said a special Mass the following morning. Another priest said: "Somebody described it as a tsunami, rolling across Inishowen, overwhelming us all". Gardaí and fire service personnel were themselves reported to be "traumatised" at what they had witnessed and in need of counselling. One fireman said he had never seen anything like it in 32 years of service. A special helpline was established by the Health Service Executive in the aftermath of the crash, while leaflets offering advice were distributed. Local people openly cried, described an "eerie" atmosphere, were hesitant while driving if another vehicle approached; work was affected. One man was heard to say that a friend living in Boston, USA was to return to Ireland but "He has changed his mind now because all his friends are dead".

=== Political response ===
Taoiseach Brian Cowen expressed shock at the "devastating news" and paid tribute from New York. Minister for Transport Noel Dempsey praised the emergency services who assisted at the scene. Minister for Justice and Law Reform Dermot Ahern said it was "horrific" and called for an improvement in road safety education. Local Senator, Cecilia Keaveney, called it "an ordeal". Labour transport spokesperson Joe Costello called it a "tragedy of immense proportions" and called for "tightening up the law". MEP Pat "the Cope" Gallagher paid tribute and described "a dark cloud" over Inishowen.

Mayor of Buncrana/Deputy Mayor of Donegal Pádraig Mac Lochlainn said there was "mind numbing devastation" in the community. Fine Gael Donegal North-East TD Joe McHugh called the crash a "nightmare", and "a terrible day for the county", suggesting that everyone in the area would have been familiar with at least one of those who died. Fianna Fáil Donegal North-East TD Jim McDaid also expressed sympathy. Fine Gael councillor John Ryan said: "I don't think I've ever come across anything of this magnitude or this level of carnage. It's unbelievable".

Northern Ireland's deputy First Minister Martin McGuinness also paid tribute.

After the funerals, two council meetings were thought to be planning to talk about road safety and counselling. There was a call for the establishment of a co-ordinated response strategy for Inishowen.

== Funerals ==
The funerals took place over a three-day period, attended by hundreds of people and each receiving extensive media coverage. On 14 July, the funerals of Hugh Friel, Mark McLaughlin and Patrick "PJ" McLaughlin took place. On 15 July, the funerals of Paul Doherty, Eamonn McDaid, Ciaran Sweeney and Damien McLaughlin took place. Paul Doherty was buried on what would have been his twentieth birthday. On 16 July, the final funeral, that of James McEleney, took place. By the time of the final funeral, Kelly, the sole survivor, was not well enough to be interviewed; a long spell in hospital was expected with the possibility of surgery. It was revealed on 27 July that he had been informed of the deaths of his friends; he had woken from a coma but was sent to a hospital in Dublin for further treatment.

== Trial ==
On 10 November 2011, the driver of the Passat was charged with dangerous driving causing eight deaths, with the defence saying his injuries meant he did not pose a "flight" risk.

On 9 February 2012, the Book of Evidence was served on the driver Shaun Kelly at Buncrana District Court, and the case was adjourned until the following month.

Kelly was convicted at trial. His sentence later increased on appeal as 'unduly lenient' for the ‘worst case of dangerous driving in history of the State’.

== Inquest ==
In a 2016 inquest, a solicitor for Shaun Kelly (then serving a sentence after pleading guilty to causing death by dangerous driving) made claims of a "coverup", stating that his client "accepted causing the deaths of the eight men, but denied causing the accident". He alleged that the driver of another car was "inches on the wrong side of the road" when the first collision occurred, a claim refuted by other statements at the inquest (including Garda evidence that the other car was 90 cm on the correct side of the road at time of impact). Ultimately the inquest upheld the verdict, with the inquest jury stating that the victims were "unlawfully killed consistent with dangerous driving". Kelly's original 4-year sentence was doubled to 8-years by the court of appeal.

== Legacy ==
John McLaughlin (46), the father of Mark McLaughlin - one of the victims, took his own life in 2013 on the third anniversary of the crash. The family said he had never gotten over the death of his son.
