= R239 road (Ireland) =

Road in Ireland

Coordinates: 55.064075°N 7.319948°W

R239 road
- Bóthar R239
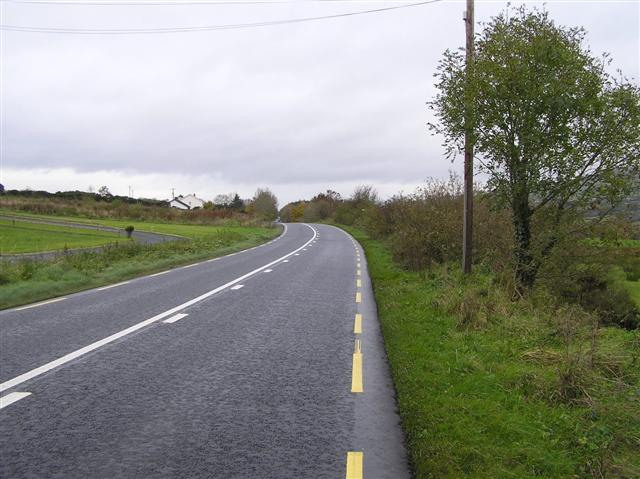
- R239 at Drumhaggart

Route information
- Length: 11.5 km (7.1 mi)

Major junctions
- From: N13 Carrownamaddy
- R238 Burnfoot
- To: R238 Muff

Location
- Country: Ireland

Highway system
- Roads in Ireland; Motorways; Primary; Secondary; Regional

The R239 road is a regional road in Ireland, located in County Donegal.
