= R242 road (Ireland) =

Irish regional road

R242 road
- Bóthar R242
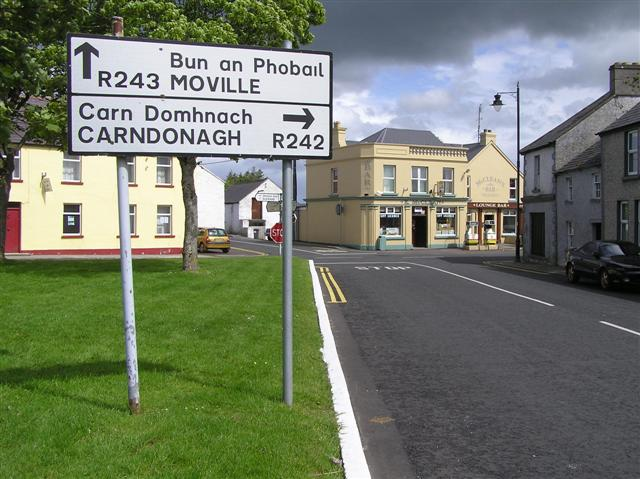
- R242 in Malin

Route information
- Length: 15.1 km (9.4 mi)

Major junctions
- From: R238 at Drumaville, County Donegal
- R243 at Malin
- To: Slievebane (or Slievebawn)

Location
- Country: Ireland

Highway system
- Roads in Ireland; Motorways; Primary; Secondary; Regional
← R241	→ R243

The R242 road is a regional road in Ireland. It is a road on the northern Inishowen Peninsula in County Donegal. The R242 is Ireland's northernmost regional road and leads to Malin Head. The road forms part of the Wild Atlantic Way.

The R242 travels north from the R238 at Drumaville to Malin village. From Malin the road travels along Trawbreaga Bay before turning inland and northward. The R242 ends at the coastguard station at Slievebawn, but minor roads continue from here towards Malin Head. The R242 is 15.1 km (9.4 mi) long.
