= HMS Ferret (1940 shore establishment) =

Shore establishment and naval base of the Royal Navy during the Second World War

Coordinates: 54.99836°N 7.31196°W

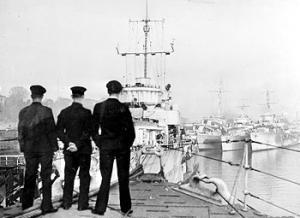
- Three sailors view numerous destroyers of the escort group B7, which are moored alongside each other after returning home to Londonderry, Northern Ireland from a patrol in the north Atlantic. Identifiable vessels include HMS Versatile, HMIS Godavari, HMS Vanessa, HMS Vidette and HMS Rochester.

History

United Kingdom
- Name: HMS Ferret
- Commissioned: 9 December 1940
- Decommissioned: 21 June 1947
- Fate: Decommissioned, re-established as HMS Sea Eagle

General characteristics
- Class & type: Stone frigate

HMS Ferret was a shore establishment and naval base of the Royal Navy during the Second World War, located in Derry. It was given a ship's name as a stone frigate.

== History ==
With the outbreak of the Second World War and the start of the Battle of the Atlantic, the Admiralty decided to develop a large new naval base in Northern Ireland to serve as a base for convoy escorts, providing repair and refuelling facilities. Derry was selected as a prime location due to Londonderry Port being the UK's most westerly port it provided the fastest access into the Atlantic. Royal Navy warships could then quickly come to the aid of convoys under attack by German U-boats, and help to escort the convoys in and out of British ports.

Part of Ebrington Barracks was handed over to the Royal Navy in mid-1941. The entire barracks came under Admiralty command in 1943 as RN Barracks Ebrington, part of the Londonderry shore base known as HMS Ferret. The old North of Ireland shipyard at Pennyburn was also taken over to be used as a ship repair facility, manned by workers from the Harland and Wolff yard at Belfast. Ships based at Ferret were under the operational control of Western Approaches Command, located in Plymouth for the early part of the war. The main headquarters for the Western Approaches Command was moved to Liverpool in February 1941 as the North Western Approaches became the most vital area of convoy activity. Ferret was then the backup for the Liverpool headquarters, with the other main bases in the area being at Greenock, and later at Belfast. The organisational function of Ferret was to form Escort Groups of the warships based there, mostly small destroyers, frigates, corvettes and armed trawlers. From 1 February 1941 these craft had a separate accounting system from the main base. By 1942 this system had been extended to handle the accounts of Royal Navy ships at St John's and Argentia naval bases in Newfoundland. A Coastal Forces base was established in April 1941, under the name HMS Ferret II.

== American presence ==
The Destroyers for Bases Agreement was finalised between Winston Churchill and Franklin Roosevelt in September 1940, and fifty ageing American destroyers were transferred to the Royal Navy as the Town class, in return for bases across the empire. As part of the deal four hundred American technicians were transferred to HMS Ferret, arriving on 30 June 1941 and started working in civilian clothes as America was not officially at war. The American personnel later moved out of Ferret and into camps constructed in the area, and on 5 February 1942 a US base was officially established. US Marines also arrived, and were used to guard the camps and the main base, as well as outlying ammunition dumps. In November 1942 Eleanor Roosevelt visited the base, accompanied by Lady Montgomery, the mother of Field Marshal Bernard Montgomery.

== Later developments ==
By 1942 Beech Hill Camp had been commissioned as HMS Ferret III, and the base had become an important centre for anti-submarine training. British and other allied submarines were sometimes used to simulate real conditions. New technological developments were also worked on to improve anti-U-boat measures. One of the innovations developed here was the Squid Mortar. The base became an important centre to train new crews, and refit ships transferred from America with the more effective British developments. Some buildings were set aside to train crews in how to handle objects on deck, one building had a full cross-section of a destroyer's deck built inside it.

== Surrender of the U-boats ==
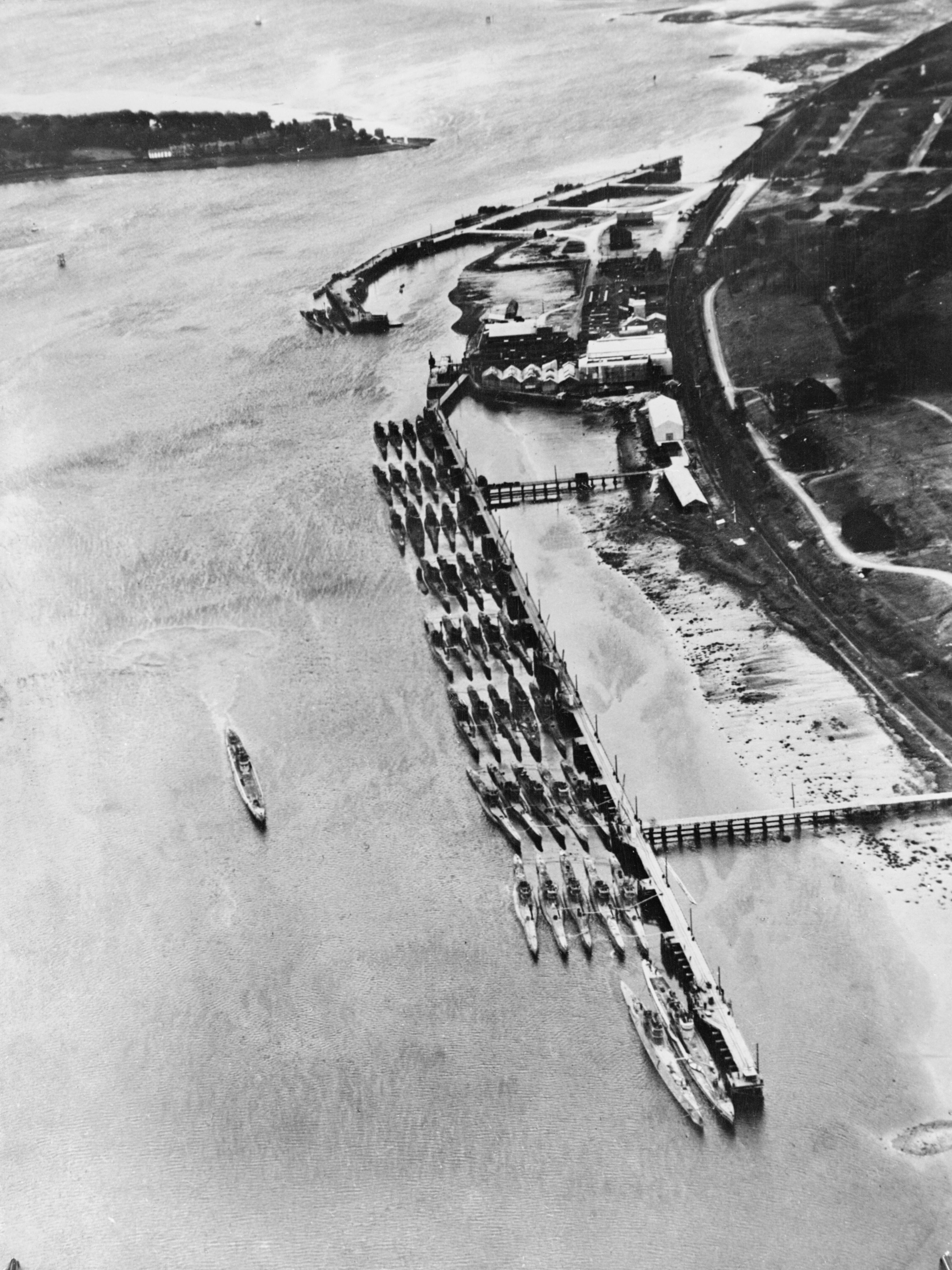
A mass of surrendered German U-boats at their mooring at Lisahally, Northern Ireland. There are nine Type XXIs (1,600 tons carrying 23 torpedoes), four Type IXs (500 tons) and thirty-nine of the Type VIIs (also 500 tons), a total of fifty-two U-boats.

After the end of the war, large numbers of captured German U-boats were surrendered to British forces on the Scottish and Irish coasts and were brought to Lisahally. The American base had been transferred to the Royal Navy on 31 October 1944 and then closed on 2 September 1944. The site was commissioned in May 1945 as HMS Ferret IV specifically for the internment. Eventually nearly sixty U-boats were brought in to Ferret IV. After a period of study and other trials, many were sunk off Lisahally and Loch Ryan during late 1945 and 1946 in Operation Deadlight. After this had been completed, Ferret IV was paid off to care and maintenance on 19 July 1946.

== Postwar ==
Eventually over twenty thousand allied troops and sailors had passed through Ferret, and the base had been home to over two hundred ships of the Royal Navy, US Navy and the Royal Canadian Navy, as well as ships from the Free French and Free Dutch naval forces and some ships of the Royal Indian Marine. There was a debate over the future of the base, but the Admiralty decided to retain the property but to convert it into a proper school for anti-submarine warfare training. There had been plans to commission the establishment under the name HMS Phoenix, but this was changed in preference to HMS Sea Eagle. Ferret was paid off on 21 July 1947, and HMS Sea Eagle commissioned that same day.

== Assessment ==
Professor J. W. Blake, in his 1956 book Northern Ireland and the Second World War summarised the importance of the work of HMS Ferret:

"Londonderry held the key to victory in the Atlantic. It became our most westerly base for the repair, the working up and refuelling of destroyers, corvettes and frigates. By that critical Spring (1943) when battle for the security of our Atlantic lifelines finally turned our way, Londonderry was the most important escort base in the north-western approaches."
