= R240 road (Ireland) =

Road in Ireland

Coordinates: 55.228694°N 7.268899°W

R240 road
- Bóthar R240
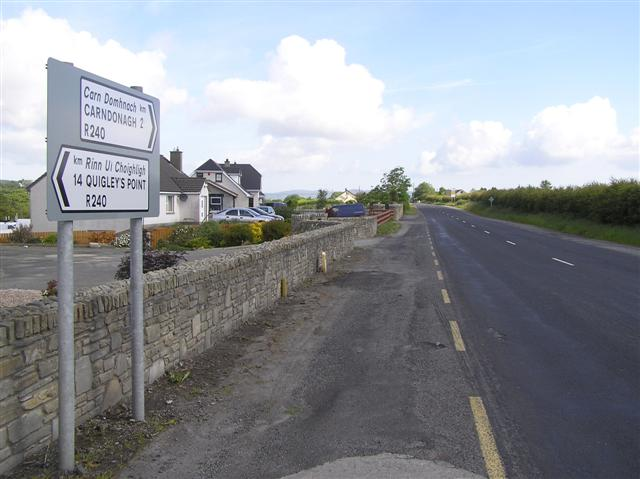
- R240 at Ballyloskey

Route information
- Length: 15.7 km (9.8 mi)

Major junctions
- From: R238 Carndonagh
- To: R238 Quigley's Point

Location
- Country: Ireland

Highway system
- Roads in Ireland; Motorways; Primary; Secondary; Regional

The R240 road is a regional road in Ireland, located on the Inishowen Peninsula, County Donegal.
