= Trawbreaga Bay =

Sea inlet in County Donegal, Ireland

Coordinates: 55°17′N 7°18′W

Designations

Ramsar Wetland
- Designated: 7 June 1996
- Reference no.: 841

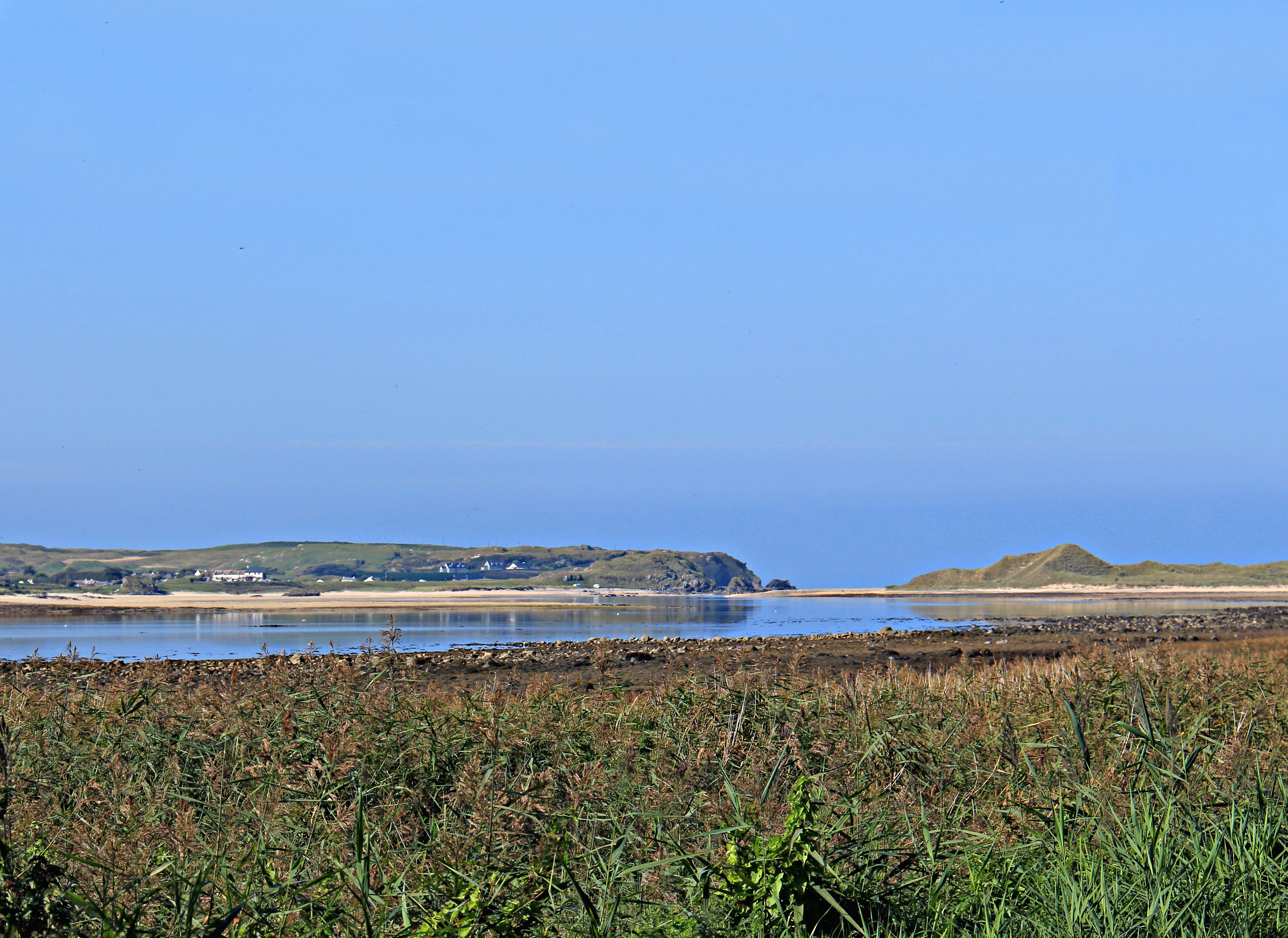
Trawbeaga Bay

Trawbreaga Bay (Irish: Trá Bhréige) is a small bay (or sea lough) located on the northern tip of the Inishowen Peninsula, County Donegal, Ireland. It is a designated Special Protection Area (SPA) and its features of interest include: the barnacle goose (Branta leucopsis), the light-bellied brent goose (Branta bernicla hrota), the chough (Pyrrhocorax pyrrhocorax) and diverse wetland and waterbirds.
