= Shrove, County Donegal =

Place in County Donegal, Ireland

Shrove An tSrúibh / Srúibh Bhrain
- hamlet and townland
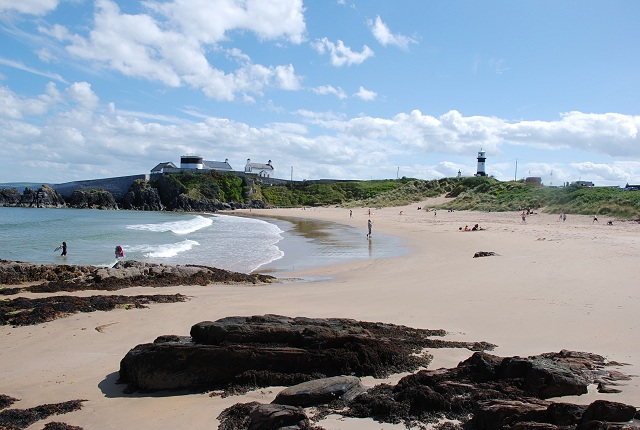
- Beach at Big White Bay, Shrove

- Location within Ireland
- Coordinates: 55.2270°N 6.9294°W
- Country: Ireland
- Province: Ulster
- County: County Donegal
- Barony: Inishowen East
- Civil Parish: Moville Lower

Shrove (/ˈʃruːv/; pronounced as 'Shroove' to rhyme with 'prove'; Irish: An tSrúibh or, originally, Srúibh Bhrain) is a coastal hamlet and townland in Inishowen in the north of County Donegal in Ulster, the northern province in Ireland. The hamlet is located a short distance to the north of Greencastle in the north-east of Inishowen, a peninsula on the north coast of Ireland. The name of both the hamlet and the townland is also sometimes written as Shroove, and is sometimes written as Stroove by some government bodies.

The hamlet of Shrove (pronounced as 'Shroove') is located beside White Bay, also known as Big White Bay, at the southern end of the townland of Shrove. Shrove Strand, also known as Shrove Beach, runs along the western edge of White Bay, the bay being slightly to the north of the entrance into Lough Foyle. Shrove lies immediately north of Magilligan Point, a hamlet a short distance away on the opposite shore in County Londonderry. All of the townland of Shrove, including the entire hamlet of Shrove, is part of the Civil Parish of Moville Lower. Shrove is at the northern end of the Wild Atlantic Way, the hamlet being on the eastern coastline of Inishowen.

== Name ==
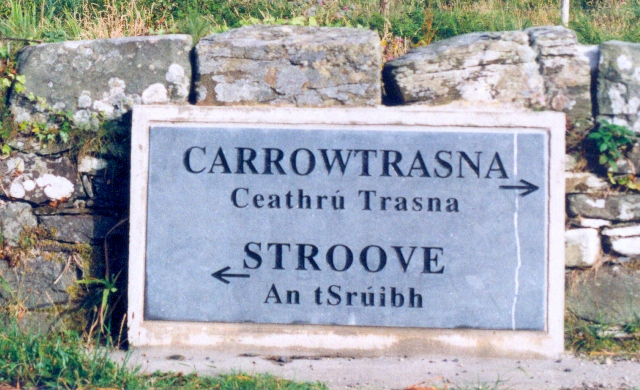
Boundary marker between the townland of Shrove (Irish: An tSrúibh) and the neighbouring townland of Carrowtrasna (Irish: Ceathrú Trasna). The alternative name 'Stroove' is used on this boundary marker.

Shrove is known in the English language by several different names. All but one of these names (that being the erroneous 'Inishowen Head') are derived from its earliest-recorded Irish language place-name, which was Srúbe Brain, later written as Srúibh Bhrain, meaning either 'point / beak of the raven' or 'Bran's point'. Srúibh Bhrain was originally the name for the headland that later became known, in the English language, as Inishowen Head, a headland also known as Inishowen Heid (Ulster-Scots), Shrove Point, Shrove Head, or Shrove Heid (Ulster-Scots). Srúibh Bhrain still remains the official Irish language name for Inishowen Head, the headland at Shrove that juts out into the Atlantic Ocean.

Over the centuries, the name of the coastal settlement and townland beside White Bay also became known as Srúibh Bhrain, later being shortened to An tSrúibh, which simply means 'the point' or 'the beak'. It is from the word Srúibh, from which most of the English language names for the hamlet derive, these names being Shrove, Shroove and Stroove. However, locally, the name of both the hamlet and the townland has been written in English as Shrove for centuries, with that spelling always being pronounced locally as 'Shroove' (to rhyme with 'prove'). The local pronunciation of the place-name Shrove is very similar to how Srúibh is pronounced in the County Donegal dialect of Ulster Irish.

In recent years, the hamlet of Shrove has often erroneously been called 'Inishowen Head' or 'Stroove' by certain tourism bodies and some tourist companies in Ireland (North and South). This has not been popular locally, where locals insist that their hamlet is called Shrove. In addition, in recent years, there has been a growing tendency by some tourism bodies and some private companies to try and change the Irish language name for Inishowen Head itself, trying to rebrand it in Irish as Ceann Inis Eoghain, when both the historic and official Irish language name for that headland is Srúibh Bhrain.

Shrove is usually written as Stroove on official documents and publications, such as maps, issued by the authorities in either Dublin or Belfast. However, this version of the place-name is never used locally. Locals consider 'Stroove' to be a completely incorrect version of the place-name.

== Inishowen Head ==
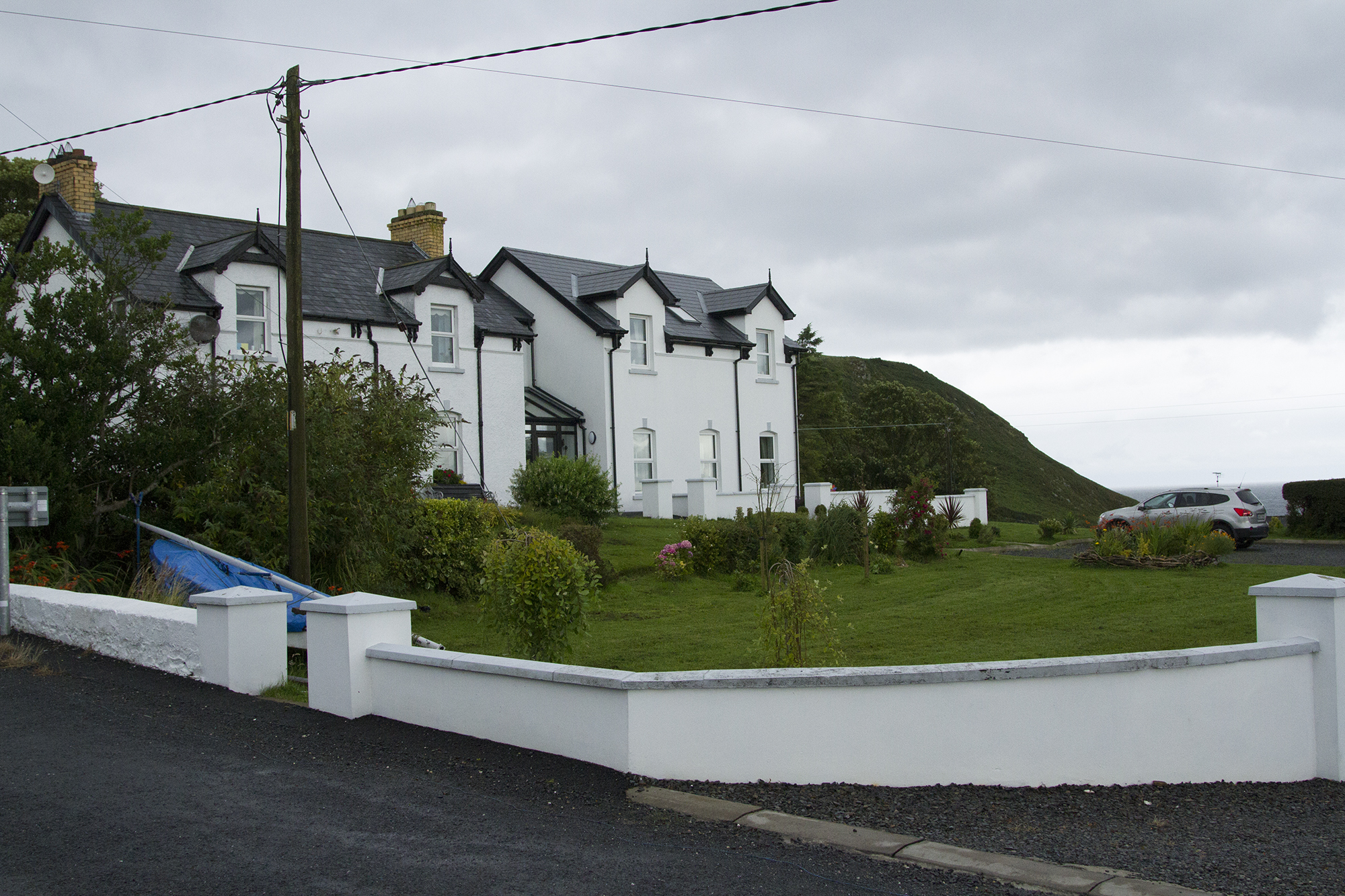
Houses in Shrove townland

Inishowen Head is a prominent headland in the townland of Shrove that juts out into the Atlantic Ocean. The headland is the most easterly place on the County Donegal mainland, and is located just to the north of Big White Bay. The original name for the headland was Srúibh Bhrain, which remains the official Irish language name for Inishowen Head. It is from Srúibh Bhrain that the hamlet and townland of Shrove derive their English language names.

== Shrove lighthouses ==
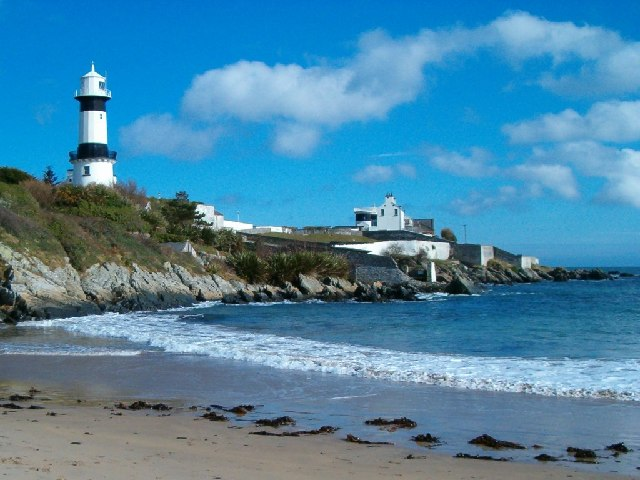
Lighthouses at Dunagree Point at Shrove.

The two lighthouses at Shrove, both located at Dunagree Point, were designed by George Halpin and were built in the 1830s. The lighthouses were built at the suggestion of the Derry Ballast Office. The light in the East Lighthouse was decommissioned in 1961, while the West Lighthouse remains in use. The structures are sometimes referred to as the Inishowen Head Lighthouses, and both are owned and operated by the Commissioners of Irish Lights (C.I.L.).

== History ==
=== Saint Columba and Portkill ===
Portkill (Irish: Port Cille; probably a shortened version of Port Cholum Cille, meaning 'Colum Cille's port' or 'Colum Cille's landing place') is a small bay just north of Shrove; the bay is located just north-west of Inishowen Head. According to local tradition, Portkill is the point from which Saint Columba (also known as Colum Cille) left Ireland when he sailed into exile in Scotland in the mid-sixth-century. Local tradition says that Columba and his followers, having sailed up Lough Foyle from Derry, landed on the small beach at Portkill in order to take on some drinking water from a spring there.

While at Portkill, Columba allegedly scrambled to the top of the steep hillside overlooking the beach in order to take one last, mournful look at his homeland. Columba and his companions then re-boarded their boat and sailed off into exile, making Portkill, according to local tradition, the last place in Ireland where Columba set foot. However, modern historians have been unable to verify if any of these Columban associations with Portkill are historically accurate. A rock with an ancient inscribed cross upon it is still located beside the small beach at Portkill. Local tradition says that Columba himself cut this cross into the rock using his finger. A holy well is also located beside the beach.

=== Mercedes Gleitze ===
In August 1929, Mercedes Gleitze, the professional British sea swimmer, swam from Shrove in Inishowen across to Portstewart, a small town on the coast of County Londonderry. 'As the crow flies', this is a distance of around 11 miles (18 km), Portstewart being to the south-east of Shrove. This involved swimming in the open sea, just north of the entrance into Lough Foyle. Gleitze had become internationally famous in October 1927 for completing the first known swim across the English Channel by a British woman. As far as is known, she was only the third woman in history to swim across the English Channel.

Gleitze initially attempted to swim from Portstewart across to Inishowen, making this attempt on 15 August 1929. However, she had to abandon this attempt half-way through, being brought the rest of the way by a motor boat to Moville on the Inishowen side. Unperturbed by this upset, she decided to try again, this time swimming from Inishowen across to Portstewart.

At 3am on the morning of Saturday, 17 August 1929, Gleitze left her lodgings at McConnell's Hotel (now The Foyle Hotel) on The Square in Moville. She was conveyed by motor car to the Pilot's Station at Inishowen Head in Shrove, where, at exactly 4:05am, she entered the water. From Shrove, she swam directly across to Portstewart. This swim took just over eight hours, which she successfully completed, becoming the first known person to complete this feat. She emerged from the sea at Bearnville Port in Portstewart at 12 noon later the same day.

Gleitze made the 'return swim' a few days later, on 20 August 1929. On this occasion, she swam from Portstewart to Black Rock Bay, between Moville and Greencastle.
