= Strabane Lifford Development Commission =

Strabane Lifford Development Commission is a cross-border body in Ireland, to develop cultural and economic development ties between Strabane in County Tyrone, Northern Ireland and Lifford in County Donegal, Republic of Ireland, just across the border marked by the River Foyle.

In 2000 a sculpture group was erected at the border between Strabane and Lifford, close to the Lifford Bridge by Strabane Lifford Development Commission. Created by Maurice Harron, the bronze and stainless steel sculpture depicts a group of musicians and dancers, symbolizing the two uniting art forms of North and South Ireland.
