= Greencastle, County Donegal =

Fishing port in County Donegal, Ireland

Greencastle An Caisleán Nua
- Town
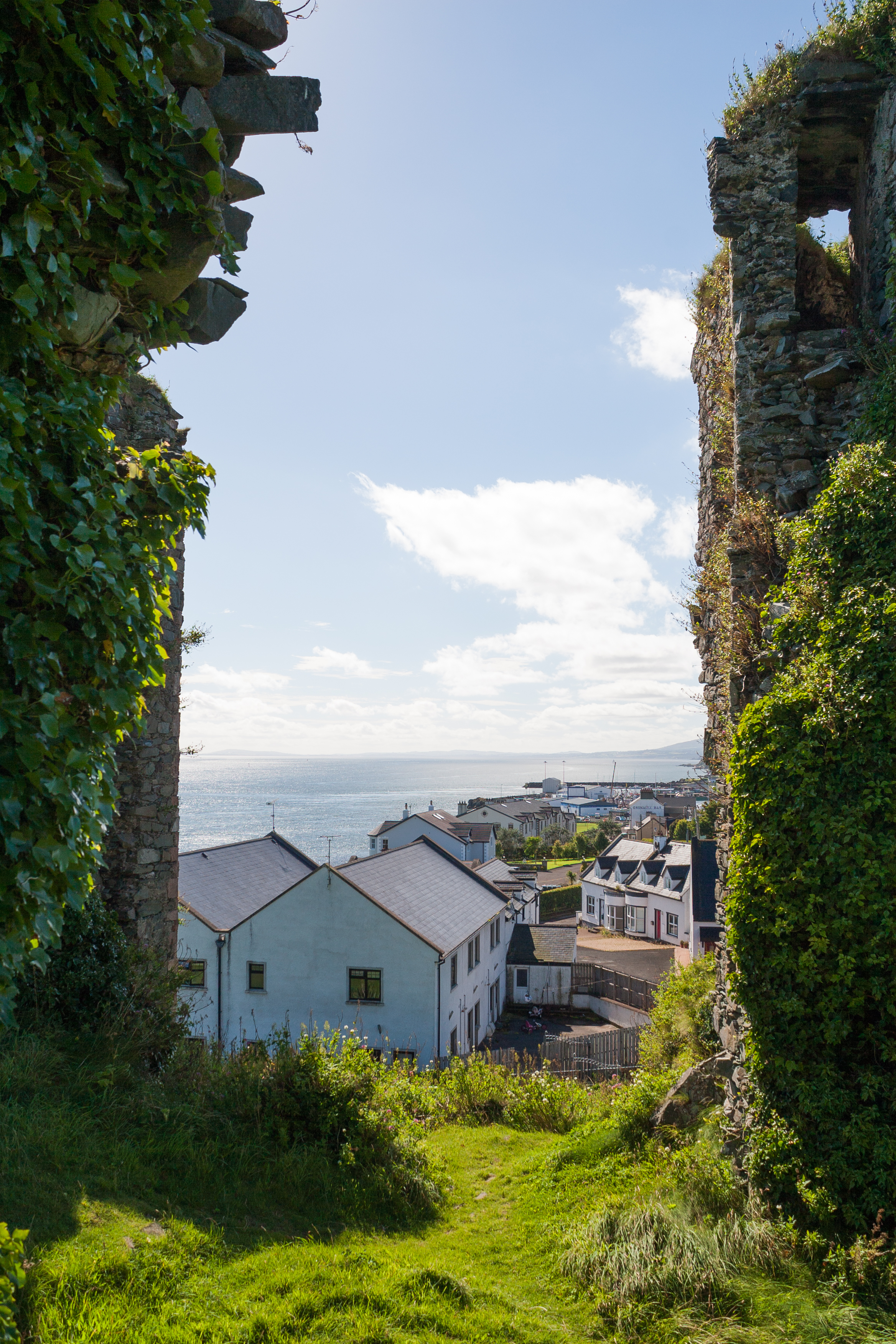
- Greencastle and Lough Foyle from the castle

- Location in Ireland
- Coordinates: 55°12′00″N 6°59′00″W
- Country: Ireland
- Province: Ulster
- County: County Donegal
- Barony: Inishowen East
- Elevation: 30 m (98 ft)

Population (2022)
  - Total: 1,268
- Time zone: UTC+0 (WET)
  - Summer (DST): UTC-1 (IST (WEST))
- Irish Grid Reference: C648397

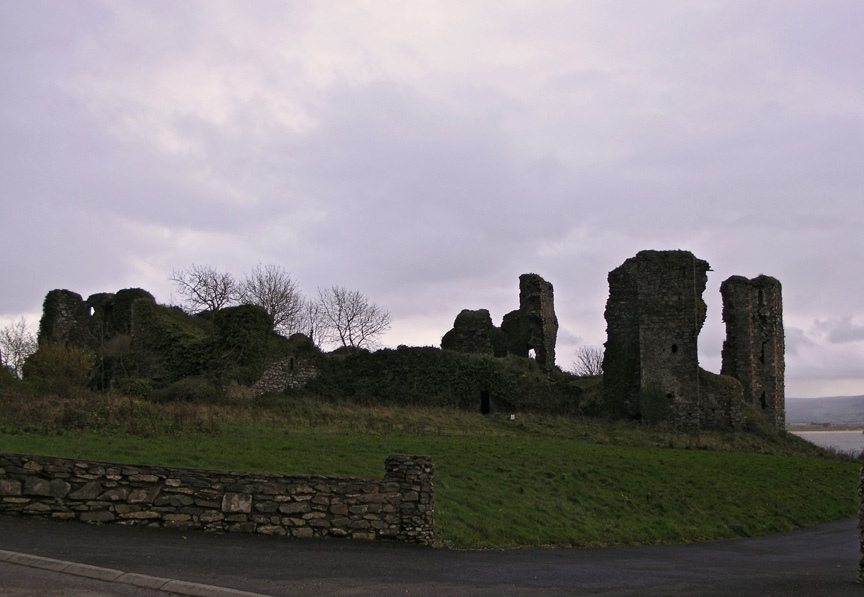
The ruins of Green Castle, also known as Greencastle Castle or Northburgh Castle, in Greencastle.

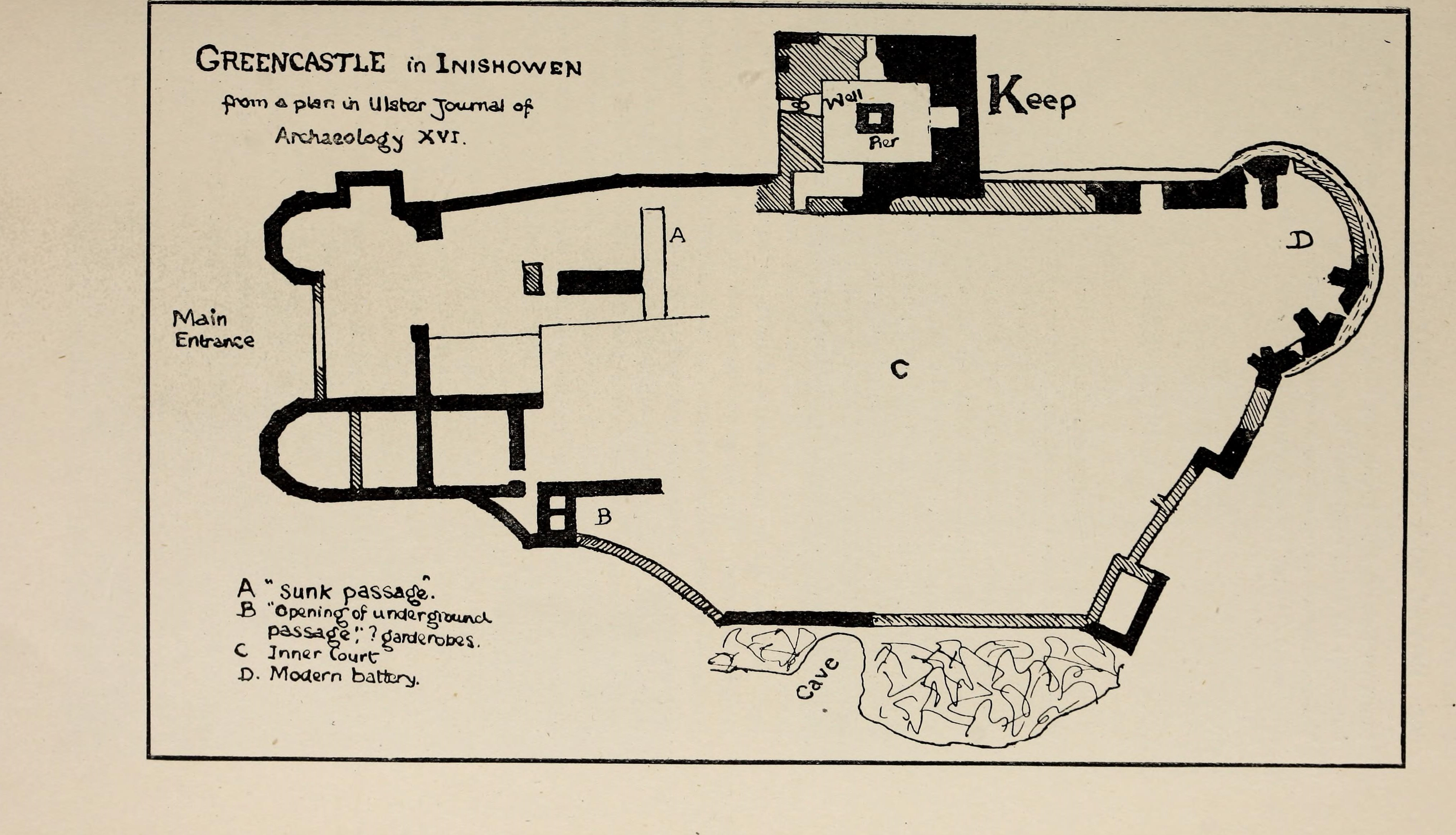
Plan of the castle

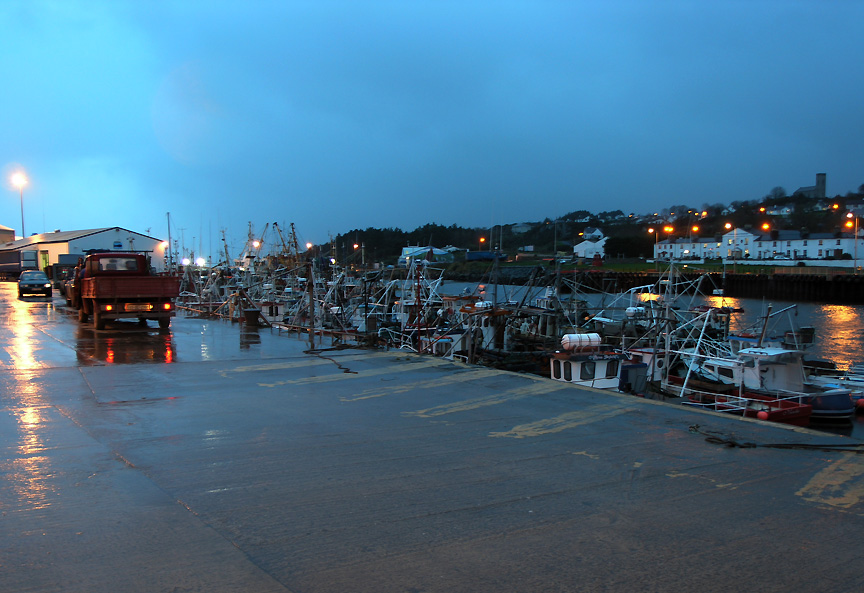
Greencastle Pier at dusk

Greencastle (Irish: An Caisleán Nua, meaning 'New Castle') is a commercial fishing port located in the north-east of the Inishowen Peninsula on the north coast of County Donegal in Ulster, Ireland. The port is on the western shores of Lough Foyle. Nowadays, given the decline in the fishing industry, it resembles more closely a 'typical' Donegal holiday village. It is located a few miles from Moville and is about 20 miles from Derry.

Greencastle's name comes from the castle in the area, which, in turn, may have derived its name from the green freestone with which it was built. The castle, originally built by the Anglo-Normans, is also known as Northburgh Castle.

The port was the fastest growing urban area in County Donegal between the 2016 and 2022 census, with a population increase of 52.6% from 831 to 1,268.

== History ==
The first proper pier was built in 1813 and has been added to several times since. Today, as well as being a tie-up for trawlers and inshore fishing boats and the home of the Greencastle Fishermen's Co-Op, the Foyle Fishermen's Co-Op and Fresco Seafoods, the pier also has a very different "catch". Visitors disembark from the Magilligan-Greencastle ferry which was inaugurated in 2002. The official website advertises the fact that this saves 78 km (or 49 miles) of driving, which would be through Derry. The Lough Foyle Ferry Company operates a Lough Swilly ferry service that runs between Buncrana and Rathmullan seasonally. The pier also contains a newly built pilot office to replace the decommissioned pilot office at Carrickarory Pier.

Greencastle is also one of the disembarkation ports for cruise ships visiting Derry. Due to the tidal nature of the Foyle Estuary, it is sometimes too shallow for cruise ships to make their way to Lisahally docks in Derry. Stopping at Greencastle also saves 5 hours sailing round trip. However, passengers are required to disembark using tenders as, unlike Lisahally docks, the Greencastle pier was not designed to allow a cruise ship to dock.

The castle at Greencastle has been linked with the castle in the background of the Derry crest.

The castle was built in 1305 to provide a base for Anglo-Norman power in the North West. This building was named "Northburg". There is a more modern Martello Fort beside the Norman ruin. This was built by the British to stop Napoleon invading circa 1800.

The National Fisheries College (NFC) is located in Greencastle. The NFC recently completed a €1.1 million extension funded under the INTERREG 11 Initiative, thus providing better facilities including a realistic simulator bridge deck.

In 2011, it was rumoured (against a backdrop in which a private company was seeking to establish a private marina in the public harbour) that visiting yachts had been turned away during a storm. A subsequent Garda investigation found that these accusations had no foundation.

== Notable people ==
- William FitzSimons (1870-1926) - Australian politician who was born in Greencastle.
- Brian Friel (1929-2015) - Playwright who lived in Greencastle from 1982 until his death in 2015.
- Mark Farren (1982-2016) - Derry City player.
- Saoirse-Monica Jackson (born 1993) - actress who was raised in Greencastle, where her parents ran a pub.
- Roma McLaughlin (born 1998), footballer for the Republic of Ireland national team.

== See also ==
- List of populated places in the Republic of Ireland
- Bellarena station
- Shrove
