= Lough Foyle =

Estuary of the River Foyle, northern part of Ireland

- Loch Feabhail (Irish)
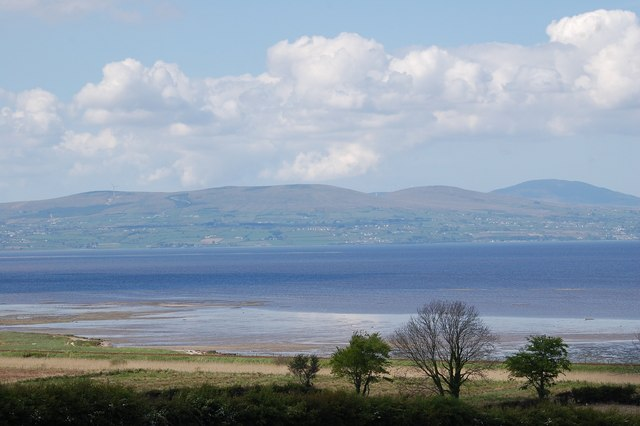
- From south shore
- Interactive map of Lough Foyle
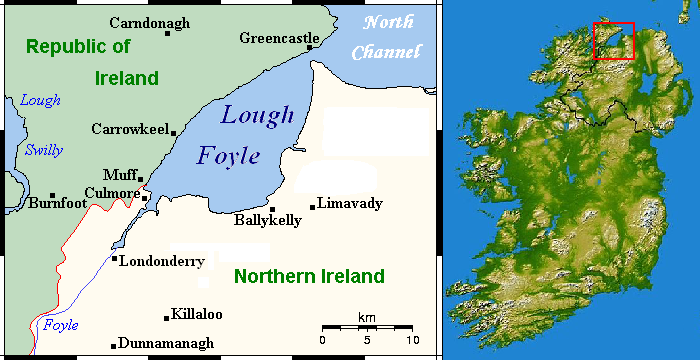
- Location: Republic of Ireland–United Kingdom border
- Coordinates: 55.12°N 7.10°W
- River sources: River Foyle, River Roe, River Faughan
- Ocean/sea sources: Atlantic Ocean
- Basin countries: United Kingdom (Northern Ireland); Republic of Ireland
- Settlements: Ballykelly, Derry, Greencastle, Shrove, Magilligan, Moville, Muff

Ramsar Wetland
- Designated: 2 February 1999
- Reference no.: 974

Lough Foyle, sometimes Loch Foyle (Irish: Loch Feabhail, meaning 'Feabhal's loch' or "lough/estuary of the lip"), is the estuary of the River Foyle, on the north coast of Ireland. It lies between County Londonderry in Northern Ireland and County Donegal in the Republic of Ireland. Sovereignty over the waters has been in dispute since the partition of Ireland and the establishment of the Irish Free State in December 1922.

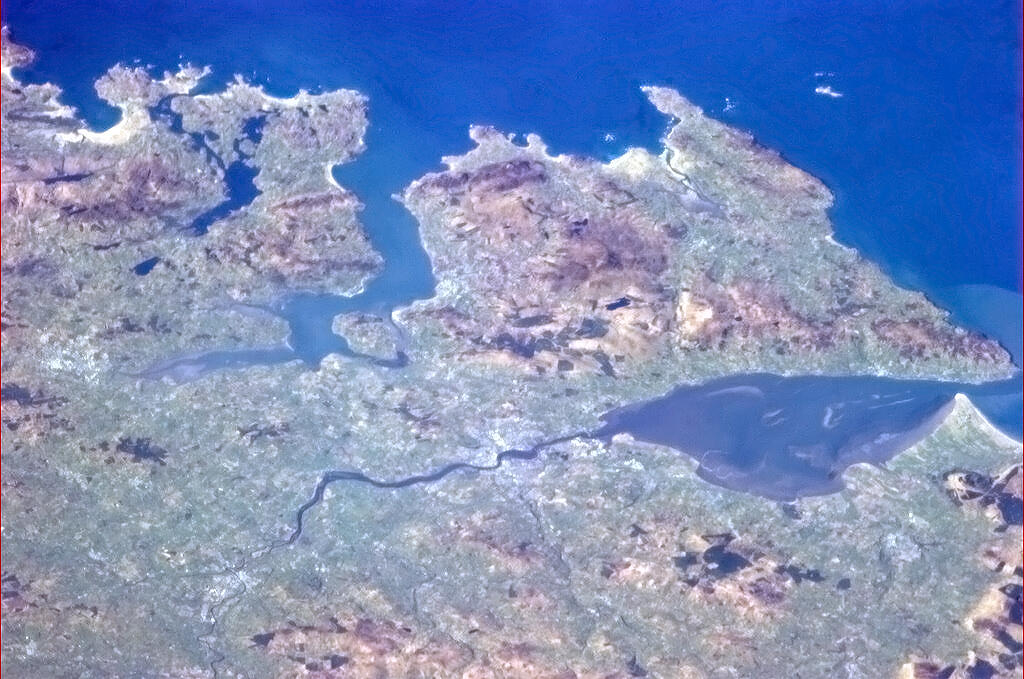
Seen from Space: Derry with the Ulster coastline with Lough Swilly west and Lough Foyle east of the city and the Inishowen peninsula.

== Flora and fauna ==
=== Flora ===
A survey of Lough Foyle was made between March 1937 and June 1939 by Helen Blackler. In this, a map shows the distribution of certain species of algae in the lough and a full annotated list of the algae recorded along with photographs of the different sites. The list included: Cyanophyceae, Chlorophyceae, Phaeophyceae, Rhodophyceae, lichens and two species of Zostera. The marine algae of Lough Foyle are also included in Morton (2003).

=== Fauna ===
The Royal Society for the Protection of Birds has a reserve at the lough.

== Transport ==
In 1792 the four-mile Strabane Canal was constructed from the tidal waters of Lough Foyle at Leck, to Strabane. The canal fell into disuse in 1962. In June 2006 the Strabane Lifford Development Commission awarded a £1.3m cross-border waterways restoration contract. The project involves the restoration of one and a half miles of canal and two locks to working order. Work began on the Lough Foyle side of the canal in the summer of 2006, but by 2010 the partial restoration was deemed unsatisfactory and the local council refused to continue to maintain the canal. The Broharris Canal was constructed in the 1820s when a cut – some two miles long on the south shore of Lough Foyle near Ballykelly – was made in the direction of Limavady. It served both as a drainage channel and a navigation, with goods being brought from the Londonderry Port, and shellfish and kelp from the sandbanks along the shore.

In the summertime, a ferry service operates between Greencastle and Magilligan across Lough Foyle.

=== Railway travel ===
NI Railways runs from Derry ~ Londonderry railway station along the scenic shore of Lough Foyle – with views of Inishowen, County Donegal as well as the Atlantic Ocean – via Coleraine to Belfast Lanyon Place and Belfast Grand Central. The strategically important Belfast–Derry railway line is to be upgraded to facilitate more frequent trains and improvements to the permanent way, such as track and signalling to enable faster services.

From Londonderry railway station the next stop is Bellarena followed by Castlerock then Coleraine en route to Belfast. Walkers alighting from trains arriving at Castlerock can walk to Mussenden Temple owned by the National Trust and can see the mouth of Lough Foyle and Greencastle some distance away in County Donegal.

== Literature ==
The main character of Alfred Bester's science fiction novel, The Stars My Destination, is named Gulliver Foyle. Bester took the names of his characters from various locations in Ireland and Great Britain.

== First World War ==
The United States Navy established the Naval Air Station Lough Foyle on the Inishowen side of the lough on 1 July 1918 to operate seaplanes during the First World War. The base closed shortly after the First Armistice at Compiègne.

== Second World War ==
At the end of the Second World War, after the Allied victory, the remainder of the German Atlantic fleet of U-boats used to attack supply lines from North America to Britain during the Battle of the Atlantic were assembled in Lough Foyle and scuttled as part of Operation Deadlight.

== Disputed status ==
Lough Foyle is a disputed territory between the Republic of Ireland and the United Kingdom; after the partition of Ireland and the establishment of the Irish Free State in December 1922, each side claimed that it was in their own territory. Although this dispute is still ongoing, there are currently no negotiations as to its ownership.

The UK's Foreign and Commonwealth Office (FCO) underlined its view on 2 June 2009 that all of Lough Foyle is in the United Kingdom, a spokesperson stating: "The UK position is that the whole of Lough Foyle is within the UK. We recognise that the Irish Government does not accept this position... There are no negotiations currently in progress on this issue. The regulation of activities in the Lough is now the responsibility of the Loughs Agency, a cross-border body established under the Good Friday Agreement."

In November 2016, James Brokenshire, the UK's Secretary of State for Northern Ireland, reiterated the UK's view that all of Lough Foyle is in the UK, whilst Charles Flanagan, the Irish Minister for Foreign Affairs, stated that the Irish government did not recognise Britain's claim to the entirety of Lough Foyle.

== See also ==
- List of loughs in Ireland
- List of Ramsar sites in Northern Ireland
- Wild Atlantic Way
