= Moville =

Port town in County Donegal, Ireland

Moville Bun an Phobail
- Town
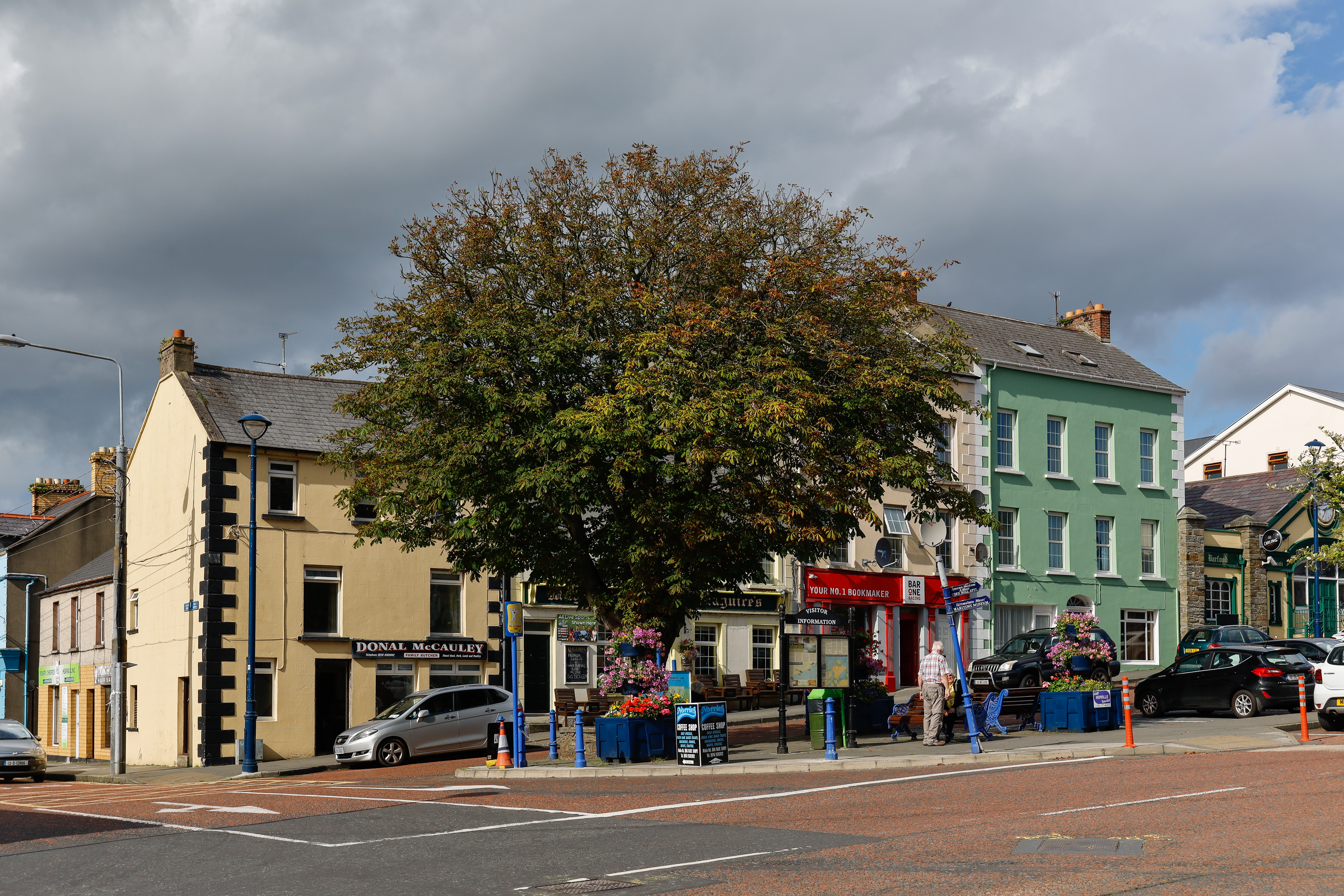
- Moville Market Square

- Location in Ireland
- Coordinates: 55°11′20″N 7°2′26″W
- Country: Ireland
- Province: Ulster
- County: County Donegal
- Elevation: 30 m (98 ft)

Population (2022)
  - Total: 1,390
- Irish Grid Reference: C648397

Moville (moh-VIL; Irish: Bun an Phobail) is a coastal town located on the Inishowen Peninsula of County Donegal, Ireland, close to the northern tip of the island of Ireland. It is the first coastal town of the Wild Atlantic Way when starting on the northern end.

== Location ==
The town is located on the western shore of Lough Foyle, approximately 30 kilometres (20 mi) from Derry, which lies across the border in Northern Ireland. Features include a pier and small working harbour; and Moville Green, a large seaside park in the Victorian style which features bandstands, walking trails, playgrounds, a coastal footpath and views east across the waters of the lough to Northern Ireland. Moville is close to several beaches and receives visitors and daytrippers in the summer months.

The town is in the civil parish of Moville Lower (Irish: Maigh Bhile Íochtarach). This alternative Irish language version of the place name, Maigh Bhile, which means “plain of the ancient tree”, is one possible origin of the English language name.

Moville Community College is located to the south of the town centre, in the townland of Carrownaff.

== History ==
In the second half of the 19th century, Moville was a point of embarkation for travellers, especially emigrants, to Canada and the United States of America. In the late 19th century, steamships of the Glasgow-based Anchor Line and Allan Line made port at Moville while en route to and from New York, while just after the turn of the 20th century, the Canadian Pacific Line also established a terminal at the port as part of their service connecting Liverpool and Montreal for Canadian-bound Irish immigrants. Today, the town receives little maritime traffic but retains a small fishing harbour. The commercial fishing port at Greencastle lies a few miles away.

The ancestors of Field-Marshal Bernard Montgomery, the Montgomerys of New Park, were a landed family of the town. When flying over the town in 1947 he commented: "It looks just the same. My dear old Irish home". His grandfather Robert Montgomery had built Montgomery Terrace in 1884.

== Festivals ==
An annual regatta is held at Moville every year and has done so since early in the 19th century.

Several music festivals take place in the area annually, including a festival of Bob Dylan music (DylanFest) which has taken place on the last weekend in August since 2007, and a festival of Beatles' music (BeatlesFest) which takes place on the August bank holiday weekend at the start of the month.

== Notable people ==
- Damien Faulkner (born 1977) – racing driver
- Sheila McClean (1932–2016) – painter
- Henry Montgomery (1847–1932) – Church of England cleric who served as Bishop of Tasmania from 1889 to 1901. Born in what was then Cawnpore in India, he was the son of Sir Robert Montgomery and father of Bernard Montgomery, 1st Viscount Montgomery of Alamein. Henry Montgomery inherited New Park in Moville in 1887, later retiring and living there until his death in 1932. He was buried in Moville.
- Sir Robert Montgomery (1809–1887) – British colonial administrator who was the son of Samuel Law Montgomery, rector of Lower Moville.
- Art Parkinson (born 2001) – actor

== Gallery ==
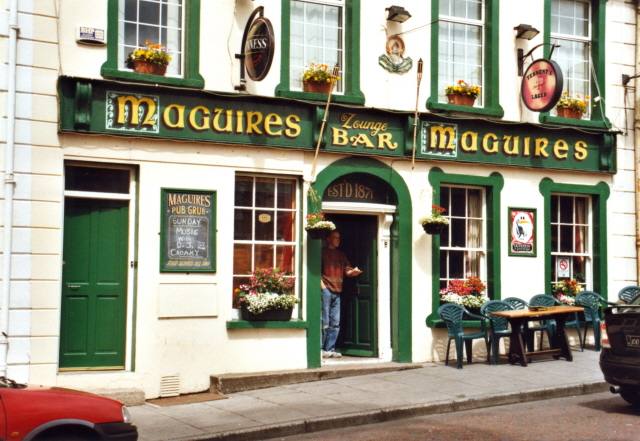
Maguire's Pub, established 1871.

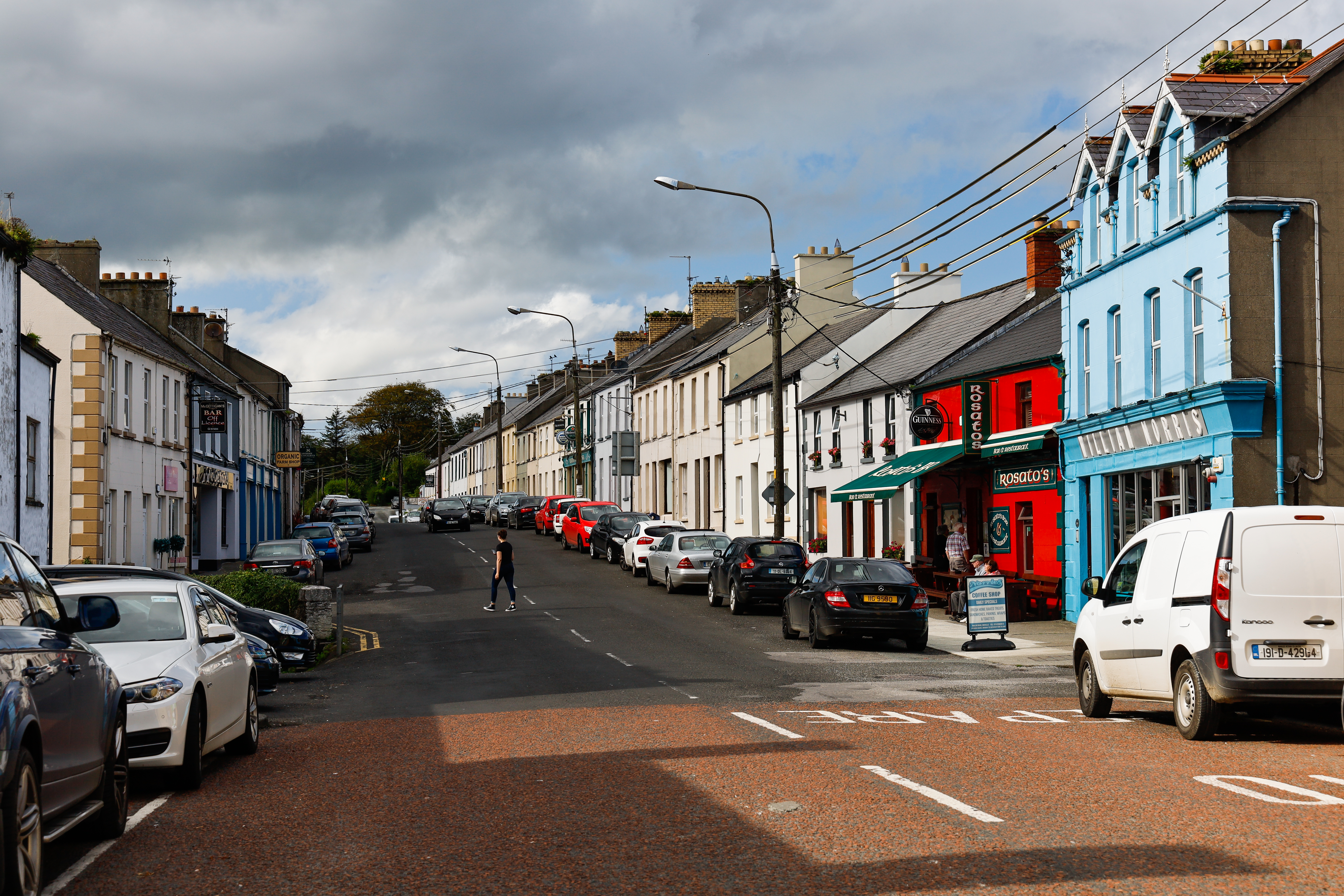
Malin Road, Moville

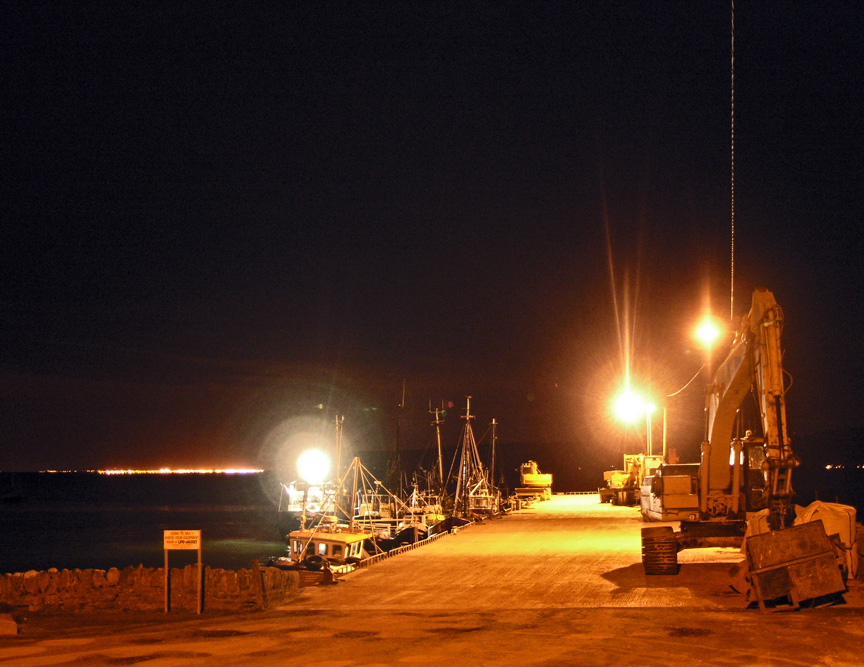
Carrickarory Pier at night - Lights of Magilligan prison on left.

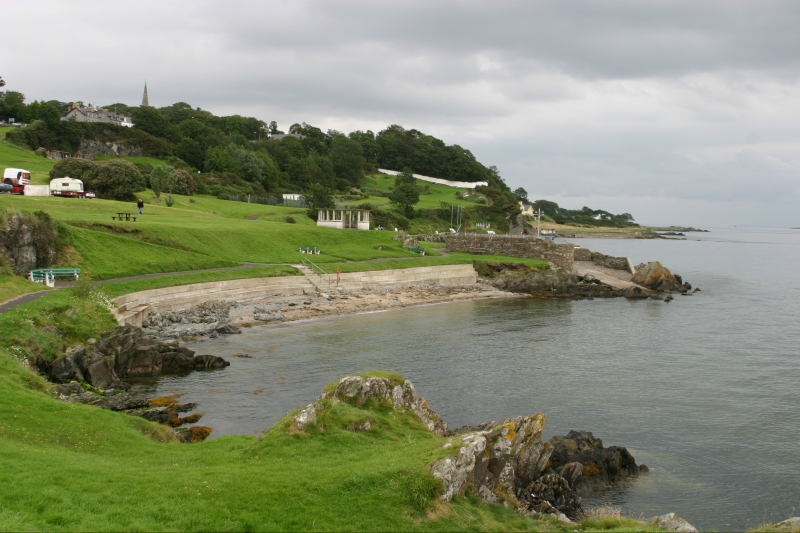
View of Moville's Green and Lough Foyle coast

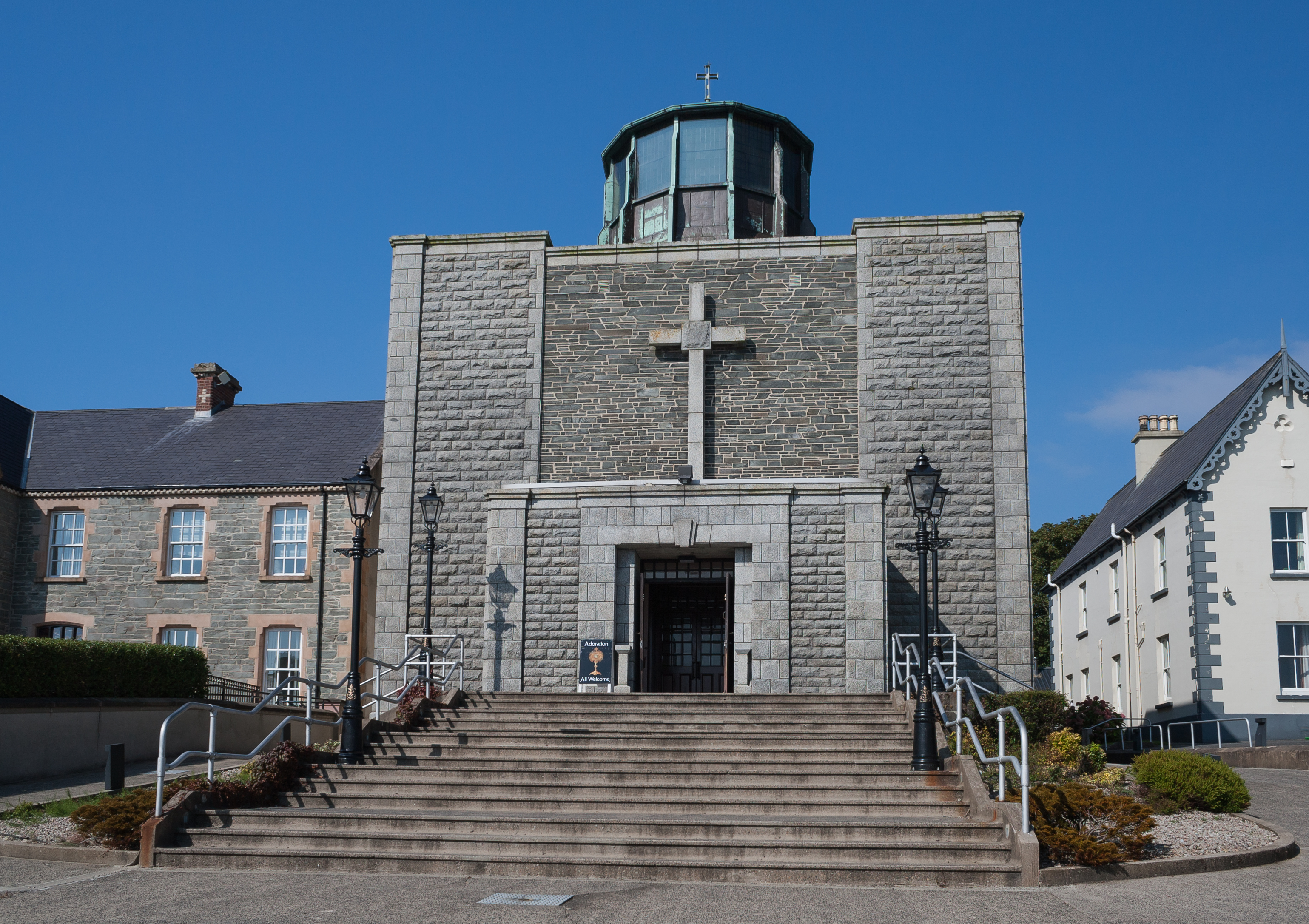
Roman Catholic Parish Church of St. Pius X with a dodecagonal lantern, built in the 1950s

== See also ==
- List of towns and villages in Ireland
