= Kinnear =

Kinnear is a Scottish name of Pictish origin which means "chieftain". Notable persons with that name include:

- A. E. Kinnear (born 1868), Australian Secretary to the Public Service Commissioner
- Andrew Kinnear (1750–1818), Canadian politician
- Ben Kinnear (born 1979), Australian footballer
- Bob Kinnear (born 1970/1), Canadian labour leader
- Charles Kinnear (1830–1894), Scottish architect
- David Kinnear (1917–2008), Scottish association football player
- David Kinnear (journalist) (c. 1806–1862), Canadian journalist
- Dominic Kinnear (born 1967), Scottish-American association football player and manager
- George Kinnear (1836–1912), American military officer and real estate developer
- Greg Kinnear (born 1963), American actor
- Kent Kinnear (born 1966), American tennis player
- Helen Kinnear (1894–1970), Canadian lawyer
- Joe Kinnear (Australian footballer) (1912–1981), Australian rules footballer
- Joe Kinnear (1946–2024), Irish association football player and manager
- John Kinnear (Irish politician) (1824–1894), Irish politician
- John Boyd Kinnear (1828–1920), Scottish lawyer, writer and politician
- Mary Elizabeth Kinnear (1898–1991), Canadian politician
- Norman Boyd Kinnear (1882–1957), Scottish zoologist
- Roy Kinnear (1934–1988), English actor
- Rory Kinnear (born 1978), English actor, son of Roy Kinnear
- Wally Kinnear (1880–1974), Scottish rower

== See also ==
- Kinnear Mountains, a range of mountains in Antarctica
- Kinnear, Wyoming, an unincorporated community
- Kinneir
