= George Downame =

British bishop

George Downame (c. 1566—1634), otherwise known as George Downham, was an author of influential philosophical and religious works who served as Bishop of Derry during the early years of the Plantation of Ulster. He is said to have been a chaplain to both Elizabeth I and James I.

== Early life and education ==
George Downame was a son of William Downame, Bishop of Chester, and an elder brother of John Downame. He matriculated at Christ's College, Cambridge, in November 1581, graduated B.A. in 1584/5, obtained the further degree of B.D. in 1595, and was made D.D. in 1601. In the early 1580s he was, although a bishop's son, briefly a "zealous espouser of puritan principles" and it was only after "mature study" that he "heartily embraced episcopy".

== Career to 1601 ==
Downame was elected a Fellow of Christ's College, Cambridge in 1587 and shortly afterwards was chosen to be Professor of Logic at the University. Thomas Fuller considered "no man was then and there better skilled in Aristotle or a greater follower of Ramus". The supremacy of Aristotle in the study of Logic (or Dialectics) was in decline and the writings of Petrus Ramus became increasingly dominant, in large part due to Downame's role as "the Cambridge apostle" for Ramus's approach. In 1601 he published an 800-page commentary on Ramus's 95-page Dialecticae, the eloquence of Downame so opening the "clenched fist" of the subject matter as to "smooth and stroke one with the palm thereof".

By 1593, he was divinity lecturer at St Paul's Cathedral, where he held the prebend of Caddington Major, and on appointment to the vicarage of Sandbach in the following year he also became a prebendary of Chester. In September 1596 he was preferred by Elizabeth I to the rectory of St Margaret's, Lothbury, continuing there until 1601 when his brother John succeeded him in the living.

Among his parishioners at Lothbury was the diplomat Sir Henry Killigrew, to whom Downame dedicated the printed text of his Easter Sermon of 1602, declaring that "to your Worship, your loving brother and the virtuous Lady your wife I am for great benefits exceedingly bound". Both Sir Henry and his brother Sir William Killigrew were on intimate terms with the Earl of Essex, which may have contributed to Downame's appointment as chaplain to the ill-fated Earl by 1599. He is said also to have served as a chaplain to Elizabeth I and James I.

== Career from 1601 ==
Downame held the rectory of Munden Magna, Hertfordshire, from 1601. While there he published the substance of his teaching at St Paul's in successive volumes.

In 1616 he was appointed Bishop of Derry. His diocese, comprising 45 parishes, was potentially valuable but in a state of decay. Little remained of the fabric of its old cathedral and 34 of its churches were ruinous or roofless.

Downame's seventeen years as bishop saw the commencement and completion of Derry's new Cathedral Church of St Columb (the first non-Roman Catholic cathedral to be built in Western Europe) and, following his failure to agree terms with the Irish Society for a suitable site within the city, he built a new Bishop's Palace overlooking Lough Swilly at Fahan. Although this was constructed on ecclesiastical land, the building costs of 2,000 marks were paid by Downame from his own private means, and in September 1634 Charles I directed Lord Deputy Wentworth to pay Downame's widow rent for the property out of the Irish Exchequer.

Downame's appointment to the See of Derry was a fitting sequel to the Church of Ireland's adoption of its own confession of faith (the "Irish Articles") in the previous year. Although he had embraced the episcopalian tradition, his theology chimed with the Calvinist tone of the Irish Articles and he brought to Ireland a deep-seated antipathy and hostility to the Church of Rome, which he declared had been controlled by Antichrist since the accession of Boniface III as Pope in 607.

His beliefs made him particularly acceptable to the Scots Presbyterian settlers in Ulster and he was vehement in opposing toleration of Roman Catholic practice. He spoke the Irish Bishops' declaration of opposition when preaching before Lord Deputy Falkland in April 1627, saying toleration made one "an accessory to superstition and idolatry and to the perdition of a seduced people".

Catholic priests had a strong hold over the native population in Downame's diocese and, in despair at the civil and military authorities' acquiescence in this, he obtained from Dublin a special commission allowing him to arrest and detain all within his jurisdiction who refused obedience to him on spiritual matters. He favoured the appointment of clergy who could catechise and preach in Irish in those parishes where it was the most spoken language, and it was perhaps on such account that Fuller declared "This learned bishop was the greatest beauty [of his diocese], endeavouring by gentleness to cicurate and civilise the wild Irish, and proved very successful therein".

== Final years ==
In 1631, Downame published, at Dublin, The Covenant of Grace in which, observed Archbishop James Ussher, he "handleth at full the Controversy on Perseverence [sic] and the Certainty of Salvation". Passages within this exposition (written in 1604) were in conflict with the Arminian tendencies of Archbishop William Laud who, in the King's name, ordered all copies of the book to be seized. By the time Laud's instruction reached Dublin, most copies had already been distributed.

Downame had arrived in Derry three years after agreement had been reached between the King and the City of London for the latter's conduct of the Londonderry Plantation. The City's progress with the enterprise was slow and in 1623 Sir Thomas Phillips was appointed to oversee reform of the Plantation. To encourage the Londoners' implementation of remedial work, their rents were sequestrated in 1625; the sequestration order was quashed in 1627 and a Royal Commission was established to investigate the Plantation's progress and problems. Downame became actively involved in these events, being appointed one of the 1625 sequestrators and a member of the 1627 Commission.

He died on 17 April 1634, aged 67, and was buried in his cathedral four days later.

== Legacy ==
Downame was one of the leading controversialists of his day, writing numerous treatises that were printed or reprinted after his death. His most enduring work was his Commentary on Ramus's Dialecticae which, in original or digest form, was standard reading for students at both English and American universities in the late seventeenth century. In 1858 Augustus De Morgan, perhaps the leading British logician of the mid-19th century, could still acknowledge the book as "an excellent work". It provided the basis, and most of the text, for John Milton's Art of Logic (1672) and, to the extent that exercises in logic are said to have played a part in shaping Milton's other works, Downame's thinking may have indirectly reached a wider audience.

Downame's library, including books that had been his father's and more than one hundred volumes previously owned by his father-in-law William Harrison, forms an important part of the present Derry and Raphoe Diocese Library Collection.

== Family ==
Downame was three times married. His first wife, Ann Harrison, was a daughter of the antiquarian William Harrison and bore him at least eleven children. She died on 18 March 1616, and on 20 April 1617 he married, at St Margaret's, Lothbury, Jaell (née de Peigne), the widow of Sir Henry Killigrew, being the "Virtuous Lady" whose benevolence Downame had acknowledged fifteen years earlier; the marriage, which was solemnised by his brother John, had been expected since the previous December. Jaell Downame was ill and made her will on 16 October 1617 but it was not proved until 1632. Following her death the Bishop married Margery Roe, a natural daughter of Sir Nicholas Bagenal and widow of Sir Francis Roe of Co. Tyrone.

Of Downame's children, James (1611–81) became Dean of Armagh, Mary married George Downing (a Member of the Dublin Parliament of 1634), Jane married a son of Bishop Andrew Knox, Elizabeth married Major Dudley Phillips (son of Sir Thomas), and Dorothy became the wife of Rev. Charles Vaughan, D.D., Prebendary of Comber, Londonderry.

All Downame's marriages and the names of his children and their spouses were recorded in his Funeral Certificate of 1634.

== Theological writings ==
His A Treatise of Justification, published in 1633, was his outstanding work of theology. Downame's other publications in this vein included:

- A Treatise Concerning Anti-christ (1603)
- An Abstract of the Duties Commanded and Sins Forbidden in the Law of God (1620)
- The Christian's Freedom (1635)
- A Godly and Learned Treatise of Prayer (1640).
