= George Downing (politician) =

Pioneer english settler in County Londonderry

George Downing (c. 1584–c.1659) was a pioneer English settler in County Londonderry during its plantation by the Livery Companies of the City of London. He was Sheriff of Derry during the 1620s and a member of the Parliament of Ireland in 1634.

== Background and arrival in Ireland ==
George Downing is generally recognised as a scion of the Downing family of West Lexham, Norfolk, and the support he received in his later years from Philip Skippon points to his being the same George Downing, born in 1584, who was uncle both to Skippon and to Calybute Downing, the subversive Vicar of Hackney. (Note: George Downing was a child of Arthur Downing, who appears with his first wife and their elder children in a pedigree contained in the "Visitations of Norfolk, 1563, 1589 and 1613" (Publications of the Harleian Society, Vol. XXXII, 1891, p. 113); among the children were Calybute, father of the Hackney cleric, and Ann, wife of Luke Skippon, for whom see Ismini Pells, Philip Skippon and the British Civil Wars: “The Christian Centurion”, Routledge, 2020, pp. 14-15.)

It was at Hackney that George Downing married Jane, one of the daughters of Edmund Rookwood of Weston Longville, Norfolk, in 1611. Her sister subsequently married James Higgons, a grocer on Old London Bridge, who engaged Downing to act as his agent at the outset of the Londonderry plantation. When, in February 1617, Higgons reached agreement in principle to take a lease of that part of the plantation allocated to the London Fishmongers' Company, Downing entered into occupation of the 3,210-acre property. In March 1619 he took formal delivery of it for Higgons following sealing of the lease, having himself been granted a superior freehold interest in part of the estate immediately beforehand. (Note: The freeholds of Altinure and Ballytemple were conveyed to him by the Irish Society in October 1618. He subsequently alienated these to Robert Thornton (Mayor of Derry, 1642-47): R. J. Hunter, “The Londonderry Plantation, 1609-41”, in Derry and Londonderry, History and Society, Geography Publications, Dublin, 1999, p. 221.)

== Sheriff of Derry and MP for Limavady ==
Although resident at the “castle” of Ballykelly, in the heart of the Fishmongers’ proportion, Downing quickly obtained influence in the newly-built city of Derry. (Note: In 1618 he was able to muster 31 men for military service at Ballykelly, and Pynnar’s “Survey of the Works and Plantations performed by the City of London in the City and County of Londonderry”, 28 March 1619, recorded him as occupying there a “good house 50 feet square and furnished with good store of arms”: Calendar of State Papers relating to Ireland in the Reign of James I, 1615-1625, p. 380. He was also named in Phillips and Hadsor’s Muster of the Inhabitants of Londonderry with their Arms, 1622, listed as one of the small number in the city equipped with a corslet: Ordnance Survey of the County of Londonderry, Vol. I, Dublin, 1837, p. 189.) He was elected one of its two Sheriffs in 1624 and 1626 and, following his first wife’s death, he married a daughter of Bishop George Downham. The bishop was a member of the 1628 Royal Commission that investigated the London Companies’ conduct of the plantation, and the Commission’s criticisms, as endorsed and enlarged by Sir Thomas Phillips, were supported by a petition to which Downing was a signatory.

Sir Thomas Phillips controlled the borough of Newtown Limavady, three miles east of Ballykelly, and in 1634 Downing was elected by the borough to the Irish Parliament which sat at Dublin in July–August and November–December that year. In 1640 he was succeeded as Limavady’s MP by Sir Thomas’s son, Dudley Phillips, for whom he had acted when the confiscated estates of the London Companies were relet by the Crown.

== Military service ==
From the outbreak of the Irish Rebellion of 1641 he served as an officer in the Company of Foot which Alderman Henry Finch raised in furtherance of a commission issued by the Lords Justices in Dublin (Note: His junior rank of ensign is perhaps surprising but may reflect the circumstance that this three-officer company was the first to be raised in Londonderry: Robert Simpson, The Annals of Derry, Londonderry, 1847, p. 67. Downing and Finch were joint-tenants of property on part of the Fishmongers’ estate within the parish of Faughanvale, from which the company was drawn: Great Parchment Book of the Irish Society, Folio F6r. Finch’s son, also Henry, married Downing’s granddaughter Thomasine Higgons: Fishmongers’ Court minutes of 19 December 1659 and 19 May 1663.) and which became part of the garrison of Derry, and he was among the officers who signed a testimonial in support of Sir Audley Mervyn, the city’s Governor, on 1 March 1645.

== Customs appointment ==
In March 1648 he was by order of both Houses of the English Parliament appointed Comptroller of Customs of the Port of Londonderry. The appointment was for life, was one of profit, and extended to the lesser ports of the plantation. Its value, although currently diminished by the Royalist Sir Robert Stewart’s use of artillery at Culmore to prevent sea access to the Parliamentary stronghold of Derry, suggests influence had been deployed in Downing’s favour within London political circles.

The possibility that Philip Skippon was the influencer is supported by the circumstance that, within a month of the Customs award, Skippon appeared personally before the Court of the Fishmongers’ Company to request Downing be allowed quiet enjoyment of lands held by sublease on the Company’s Londonderry estate.

Downing’s Customs appointment was short-lived. In October 1648 Sir Charles Coote, commanding the garrison in Derry, took Robert Stewart prisoner and on 8 January 1649 a grateful Parliament resolved that Coote was “to hold and enjoy the Fort of Culmore and the Customs of Londonderry, rendering an account of Profits to the Use of the State”. Such enjoyment also proved transitory: in April, Royalist forces began a four-month siege of Derry and Culmore, subjecting the inhabitants to “the greatest extremities” – of which Henry Finch’s letters are the principal surviving account. (Note: See A True Relation of the Twenty weeks Siege of Londonderry… In two Letters from Captaine Henry Finch… To his Friend in London, London, 1649.)

== Last years ==
The Letters Patent by which Cromwell granted Derry a new charter of incorporation on 24 March 1657 named Downing first when listing the twenty-four chief burgesses of the city, but his involvement in Derry’s civic affairs in the 1650s is not otherwise evidenced in extant records. The Civil Survey of 1654 named him as co-lessee with his son-in-law of a minor portion of the Fishmongers’ estate, and in 1658 the Fishmongers heard a further application for him to be free from disturbance on his land there. (Note: Pender's Census names him as one of three men having title to property in Ballykelly in the period 1654-59: A Census of Ireland circa 1659, ed. Seamus Pender, Stationery Office, Dublin, 1939, p. 129. For Downing’s holdings c. 1640, see Hunter, p. 243.) On the latter occasion the application was presented by “Major Cruso”, probably John Cruso the military tactician and long-standing friend of Philip Skippon. (Note: Cruso’s The Art of Warre, or Military Discourses (Cambridge, 1639) was dedicated “To the worshipfull, my worthily honoured friend, Philip Skippon Esquire.”)

== Death and family ==
Downing died at some point between his attending a meeting of the burgesses constituting the Corporation of Limavady, on 24 June 1659, and the election of his successor as a burgess on 26 June 1660.

In 1664 his widow travelled to the Fishmongers’ Court in London to protest her poverty and her apprehension arising from the Company’s lease of its Irish estate to Sir Randal Beresford. She was Downing’s third wife. There is no evidence he had any child who survived to maturity other than a daughter, Mary, who married James Higgons junior (son of the Fishmongers’ first lessee at Ballykelly) and, after his death in 1642, Capt. Nicholas Lane (son of the cartographer Nicholas Lane).
