= Limavady Distillery =

Distillery

Coordinates: 55°3′27″N 6°56′55″W

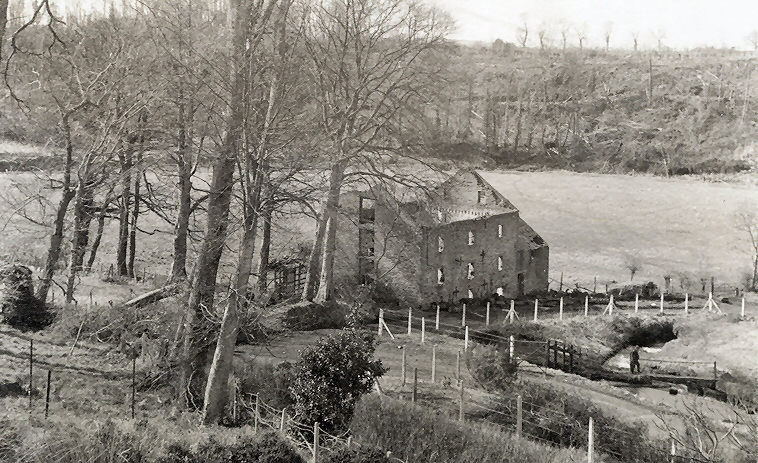
- Location: Limavady, County Londonderry
- Founded: 1750
- Founder: John Alexander
- Status: Defunct
- Water source: River Roe

The Limavady Distillery was an Irish whiskey distillery founded in 1750 in the borough of Limavady, County Londonderry, Ireland, close to Binevenagh mountain. All of the whiskey bottled under the Limavady whiskey brand was produced at the Limavady Distillery and used water drawn from the River Roe.

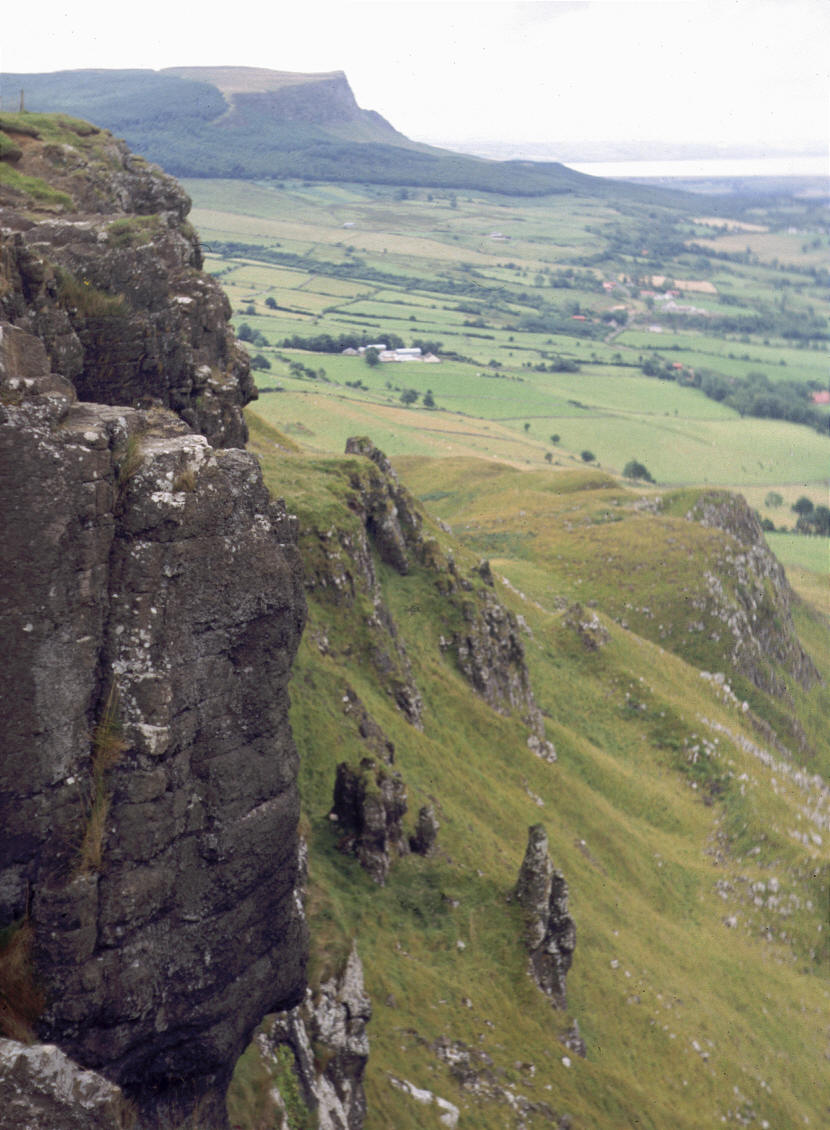
View towards Limavady Distillery and town of Limavady on Binevenagh mountain.

== History ==
The Limavady area (also known as O'Cahan's country) has a long tradition with distillation. In 1608, a licence was granted to Sir Thomas Phillips by King James VI and I to distill whiskey.

for the next seven years, within the countie of Colrane, otherwise called O Cahanes countrey, or within the territorie called Rowte, in Co. Antrim, by himselfe or his servauntes, to make, drawe, and distil such and soe great quantities of aquavite, usquabagh and aqua composita, as he or his assignes shall thinke fitt; and the same to sell, vent, and dispose of to any persons, yeeldinge yerelie the somme 13s 4d...

1613 - Sir Thomas Phillips, who was granted by King James I the first licence to distil whiskey in Ireland in 1608, founded Newtown Limavady.

1750 – Irish whiskey distillery was established in Limavady by John Alexander in 1750 on his family lands.

1805 - A David Cather took over the Limavady distillery and added a brewery on the outskirts of the town and records confirm that a lineal descendant of the O’Cahans clan, a stonemason by trade, built the chimney stack of this distillery.

1864 - The brewing and malting firm James Galloway & Co acquired the business from the Cather family.

1880 – James McLoughlin acquired the Limavady distillery from James Galloway & Co.

1883 – James McLoughlin sold Limavady Distillery Co to Young, King & Co Ltd a Belfast Whiskey Blending Firm.

1886 - Alfred Barnard visited Limavady Distillery and said Limavady whiskey "cheers the heart of many an ‘Exile of Erin’ in distant colonies of the Empire".

1890 – Production hits 1.2 million litres of pure alcohol per annum.

1913 – Young, King & Co become part of the Distillers Finance Corporation (DFC), a primarily Scotch whisky company.

1915 – Limavady Distillery closed – DFC rationalised the distilling industry by acquiring more Irish distilleries and closing them within two years of their acquisitions.
