= Myroe =

Hamlet in County Londonderry, Northern Ireland

Coordinates: 55.077°N 6.965°W

Myroe is a large farming hamlet on the outskirts of Limavady in County Londonderry, Northern Ireland. It was built in the late 18th century CE on reclaimed land in the Roe Valley close to Lough Foyle.

The hamlet was the venue for the 1991 World Ploughing Contest.

Local tradition holds that Jane Ross first wrote down the tune The Londonderry Air after hearing it played by a blind fiddler from Myroe named Jimmy McCurry.
