= Limavady =

Town in County Londonderry, Northern Ireland

Coordinates: 55.053°N 6.946°W

Limavady: Irish: Léim an Mhadaidh; Scots: Limavadie
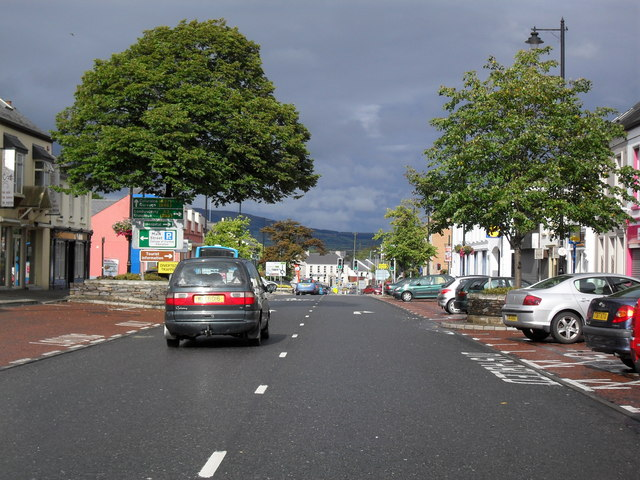
- Main Street

- Location within Northern Ireland
- Population: 11,279 (2021 census)
- District: Causeway Coast and Glens
- County: County Londonderry
- Country: Northern Ireland
- Sovereign state: United Kingdom
- Post town: LIMAVADY
- Postcode district: BT49
- Dialling code: 028
- Police: Northern Ireland
- Fire: Northern Ireland
- Ambulance: Northern Ireland
- UK Parliament: East Londonderry
- NI Assembly: East Londonderry
- Website: Causeway Coast and Glens Borough Council

Limavady (/lɪməˈvædi/; from Irish Léim an Mhadaidh 'leap of the dog') is a market town in County Londonderry, Northern Ireland, with Binevenagh as a backdrop. Lying 17 miles (27 km) east of Derry and 14 miles (23 km) southwest of Coleraine, Limavady had a population of 11,279 people at the 2021 Census. In the 40 years between 1971 and 2011, Limavady's population nearly doubled. Limavady is within the Causeway Coast and Glens local government district.

From 1988 to 2004, a total of 1,332 dwellings were built in the town, mainly at Bovally along the southeastern edge of the town. The large industrial estate at Aghanloo is 2 miles (3 km) north of the town.

== History ==
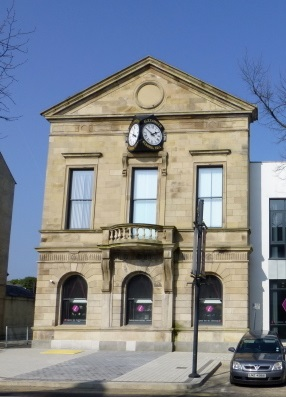
Limavady Town Hall, now part of the Roe Valley Arts & Cultural Centre

Limavady and its surrounding settlements derive from Celtic roots, although no-one is sure about the exact date of Limavady's origins. Estimates date from around 5 CE. Early records tell of Saint Columba, who presided over a meeting of the Kings at Mullagh Hill near Limavady in 575 CE, a location which is now part of the Roe Park Resort.

Gaelic Ireland was divided into kingdoms, each ruled by its own family or clan. In the Limavady area, the predominant family was the O'Cahans. Their mark is found everywhere in the town and surrounding area. O'Cahan's Rock is one of Limavady's main historical points. This is where, according to local myth, a dog belonging to one of the Chiefs jumped the river to get help from nearby clans after a surprise enemy attack. This gave Limavady its name, Limavady being the anglicised version of Leim an Mhadaidh, which means leap of the dog. This rock, along with other relics of Limavady's history, can be seen at Roe Valley Country Park.

The town developed from a small Plantation settlement founded by Sir Thomas Phillips. In 1610 Sir Thomas Phillips was granted 13,100 acres of land at Limavady which included an O'Cahan castle. He commenced the building of the 'Newtown of Limavady' which was laid out in a cruciform road pattern. Newtown Limavady was incorporated, with the appointment of a Provost and 12 Burgesses, on 31 March 1613 with a charter granted by James I. By 1622, 18 one-storey houses and an inn had been built and they were centred on the crossroads which contained a flagpole, a cross and stocks.

Limavady had an early association with the linen and Irish whiskey industries. In 1608, a licence was granted to Sir Thomas Phillips by James I to distil whiskey.

for the next seven years, within the countie of Colrane, otherwise called O Cahanes countrey, or within the territorie called Rowte, in County Antrim, by himselfe or his servauntes, to make, drawe, and distil such and soe great quantities of aquavite, usquabagh and aqua composita, as he or his assignes shall thinke fitt; and the same to sell, vent, and dispose of to any persons, yeeldinge yerelie the somme 13s 4d...

The Limavady Distillery was founded in 1750 on the banks of the River Roe. Limavady, however, did not benefit from subsequent expansion of linen manufacturing in the 19th century. As a result, it remained a modest sized market town until the late 20th century. Limavady Town Hall, later known as the Alexander Memorial Hall and now part of the Roe Valley Arts & Cultural Centre, was completed in 1872.

In 1941 RAF Limavady, a base for air patrols over the Atlantic during World War II, was opened just to the north of the town. The RAF left the base in 1945 but it continued as a naval air station until 1958, when the land was returned to agricultural use.

During the Troubles in Northern Ireland, four people were killed in or near Limavady by the Provisional IRA. Two were members of the security forces and two were civilians who were killed by a bomb as they drove past Limavady Royal Ulster Constabulary station.

In 1987, Limavady became famous as the unintended arrival point for the world's first transatlantic hot air balloon crossing by Richard Branson and Per Lindstrand.

== Townlands ==
Limavady sprang up within the townland of Rathbrady Beg in the parish of Drumachose and was originally known as Newtown Limavady. Over time, the urban area has expanded into the surrounding townlands. These include:

- Bovally (from Irish Bóbhaile 'cow town' or Bóbhealaigh, 'cow pass')
- Carran (historically Carrownakilly, from Ceathrú na Coille, 'quarter of the wood')
- Coolessan (from Cúil Leasáin, 'nook of the little fort')
- Deer Park (historically Gortney, probably from Gort an Fhia, 'field of the deer')
- Enagh (probably from Eanach, 'marsh')
- Killane (from Cill Liadhaine, 'Leonard's church')
- Mullagh (from Mullach, 'hilltop' – location of Roe Park, and historical site of Druim Ceat)
- Rathbrady Beg and Rathbrady More (from Ráth Bhríde, 'fort of Saint Brigid')

== Politics ==
Limavady is in both the Causeway Coast and Glens area. In 2023, the residents of Limavady district elected 2 Democratic Unionist Party, 1 Social Democratic and Labour Party, 1 Sinn Féin and 1 Alliance Party councillor to the borough council. It is in the East Londonderry constituency for elections to the Westminster Parliament and Northern Ireland Assembly.

== Places of interest ==
- Limavady lies in the scenic Roe Valley area and the Roe Valley Country Park on the River Roe lies to the southwest of the town.
- The birthplace of New Zealand Prime Minister Rt. Hon. William Massey is on Irish Green Street. Nearby Massey Avenue is named after him.
- A bronze statue of Rt. Hon. William Massey is positioned outside of the Causeway Coast and Glens Borough Council's Limavady Office, and the Limavady Library. The statue was subject to controversy due to Massey's position as the Grand Master of the Orange Order in New Zealand. Sinn Féin requested the removal of the statue because of his Orange Order links.
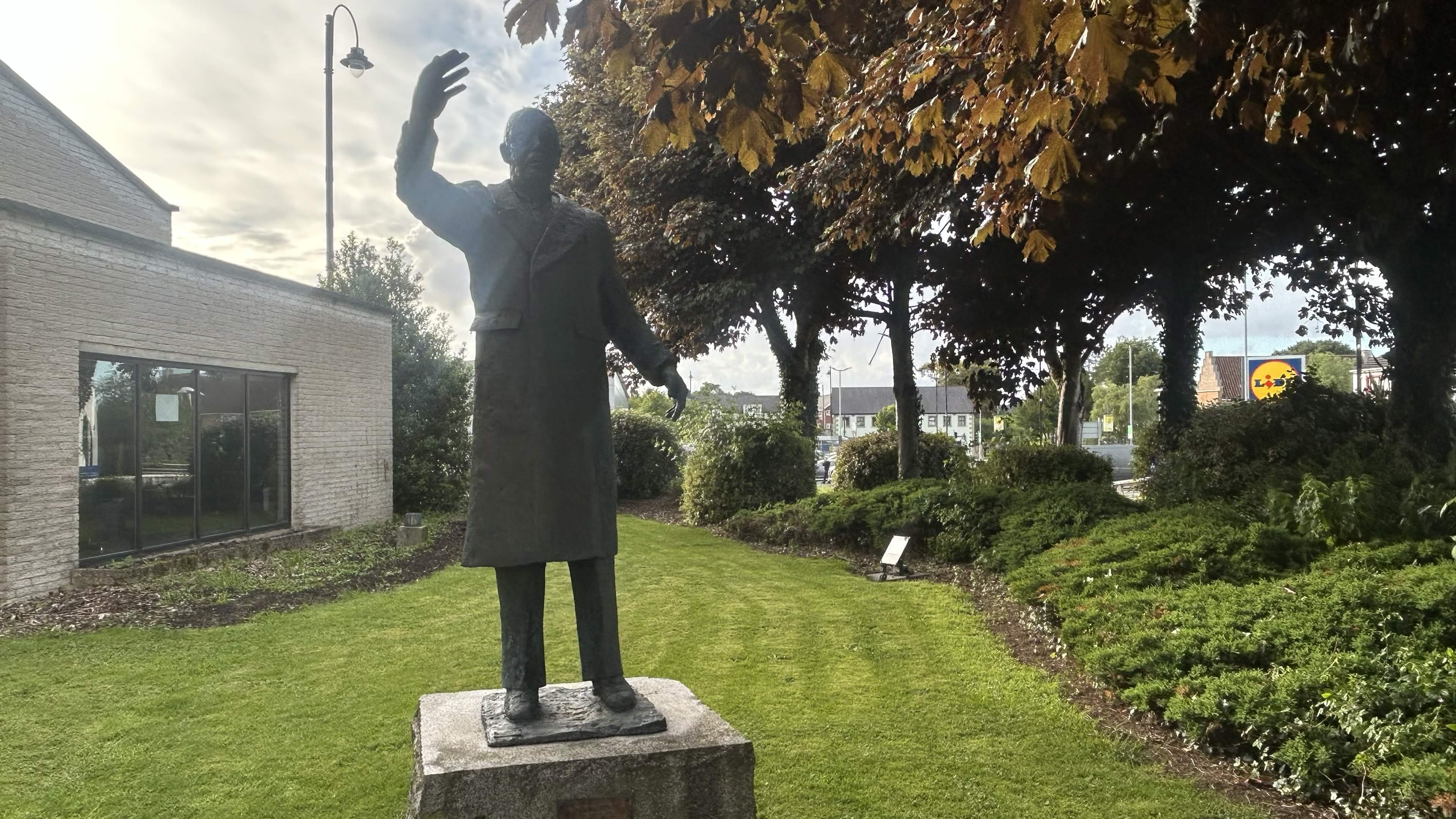
  The bronze statue of Rt. Hon. William Massey in front of the Limavady Library.
- The archaeologically significant Broighter Gold collection was found nearby in 1896. It is currently in the National Museum in Dublin, having previously been on display in the town in 2013.
- Jane Ross, who first transcribed Londonderry Air, was born and lived in Limavady. A plaque is shown above her old house on Main Street.

== Demography ==
=== 2021 census ===
On census day (21 March 2021) there were 11,729 people living in Limavady. Of these:

- 19.26% were aged under 16, 62.83% were aged between 16-65, and 17.90% were aged 66 and over.
- 51.4% of the usually resident were female and 48.6% were male.
- 47.6% belong to or were brought up Protestant (including other Christian-related denominations), 45.65% belong to or were brought up Catholic, 0.45% belong to or were brought up in an 'other' religion, and 6.3% did not adhere to or weren't brought up in any religion.
- 39.93% indicated that they had a British only identity, 26.47% had a Northern Irish only identity, 18.51% had an Irish only identity, 3.78% had an 'other' national identity and the remaining 11.31% indicated a mixture of identities. When accounting for the fact respondents could select multiple national identities, 50.6% indicated that they had a British identity, 37.45% had a Northern Irish identity, and 22.20% had an Irish identity.
- 10.24% had some knowledge of Ulster Scots and 8.15% had some knowledge of Irish (Gaeilge).

=== 2011 census ===
On census day (27 March 2011) there were 12,032 people living in Limavady (4,759 households), accounting for 0.66% of the NI total. Of these:

- 21.52% were aged under 16 years and 13.54% were aged 65 and over
- 51.37% of the usually resident population were female and 48.63% were male
- 51.83% belong to or were brought up in a 'Protestant and Other Christian (including Christian related)' religion and 44.41% belong to or were brought up in the Catholic religion
- 56.27% indicated that they had a British national identity, 31.08% had a Northern Irish national identity and 18.47% had an Irish national identity (respondents could indicate more than one national identity)
- 37 years was the average (median) age of the population
- 9.20% had some knowledge of Ulster-Scots and 6.43% had some knowledge of Irish (Gaeilge).

== Transport ==
Limavady is in close proximity to City of Derry Airport, 9 miles (15 km) to the west, and the Port of Londonderry, 13 miles (22 km) to the west.

=== Road ===
In 2003 a road bypass was completed to the north of Limavady at a cost of £11.5 million. This bypass aimed to reduce the time taken to travel on the A2 between Derry and Coleraine.

=== Rail ===
The Limavady Railway was a branch line to the main Belfast–Derry line. Limavady railway station opened on 29 December 1852, closed for passenger traffic on 3 July 1950 and finally closed altogether on 2 May 1955. Nowadays it is the site of the bus station, which Ulsterbus occupies. Limavady Junction railway station opened on 1 March 1855 and finally closed on 17 October 1976. Limavady is no longer served by the branch line – the nearest station is at Bellarena, approximately 5 miles (8.0 km) from the town.

Bellarena railway station has direct trains west to Derry~Londonderry and east to Castlerock, Coleraine (for stations to Portrush), and stations to Belfast Lanyon Place and Belfast Grand Central.

An All-Island Review on railways commissioned in 2021 recommended that a short spur of the Limavady branch line be reinstated up to Limavady to restore services.

=== Canal ===
The Broharris Canal was constructed in the 1820s when a cut, some 2 miles (3.2 km) long on the south shore of Lough Foyle near Ballykelly was made in the direction of Limavady. The inhabitants of Limavady appealed for the building of a canal from Lough Foyle to the town but were turned down, and the Broharris Canal was the nearest they came to achieving such a navigable link.

== Education ==
There are five primary schools, three secondary schools, a regional college and a special education school in Limavady. Limavady's schools are closely located in an 'education circle'. The three secondary schools are all located along the same stretch of road (Ballyquin Road and Irish Green Street), with Rossmar Special School adjacent to Limavady Grammar School, Termoncanice Primary opposite Limavady High School and St. Mary's High School. Limavady Central Primary School is located a short distance from the other schools. Roe Valley Integrated is situated further down Ballyquin Road. Gaelscoil Leim An Mhadaidh, is situated where Roe Valley Integrated previously lay on Roe Mill Road.

=== Primary schools ===
- Termoncanice Primary School
- Roe Valley Integrated Primary
- Limavady Central Primary School
- Drumachose Primary School
- Gaelscoil Leim An Mhadaidh

=== Secondary schools ===
- St Mary's High School
- Limavady Grammar School
- Limavady High School

=== Regional college ===
- North West Regional College

=== Special needs schools ===
- Rossmar Special School (formerly Limegrove/Greystone Hall)

== Sport ==
- Limavady CRFHC is the local Cricket, Rugby, Football, and Hockey Club
- Limavady United F.C.
- Roe Valley F.C.
- Roe Rovers F.C.
- Newtowne F.C.
- Drummond Cricket Club

== Popular culture ==
=== Danny Boy ===
Limavady is most famous for the tune "Londonderry Air" collected by Jane Ross in the mid-19th century from a local fiddle player. The tune was later (ca. 1913) used for the song "Danny Boy".

=== Events ===
The town hosts events such as the NI Super Cup, the Danny Boy Jazz and Blues Festival, the Roe Valley Folk Festival; the Stendhal Festival of Art, and the Bishop Hervey International Summer School.

== Notable people ==
- Rev. Robert Bradford MP - Methodist Minister and MP for South Belfast. Murdered by the Provisional IRA on 14 November 1981.
- David Brewster LLB - noted Solicitor and former UUP Forum member for East Londonderry 1996.
- John Deighan – Derry GAA Gaelic footballer and SDLP Councillor.
- Sir Denis Desmond, KCVO, CBE (Born 1943), is a retired British company director and public administrator, who was Lord Lieutenant of County Londonderry from 2000 to 2018. Lives in Bellarena House just outside Limavady.
- Boyd Douglas (born 13 July 1950) - Councillor on Limavady Borough Council and later Causeway Coast and Glens Borough Council from 1997 - 2014. He also served as MLA for East Londonderry from 1998 to 2003.
- William Douglas - Flight Lieutenant in the Royal Air Force during the Second World War. He rose to prominence as Limavady District Master in the Orange Order. From 1960 to 1973, he served on Limavady Rural District Council. He was then elected in Londonderry for the Ulster Unionist Party at the 1973 Northern Ireland Assembly election, and held his seat on the Constitutional Convention and at the 1982 Assembly.
- George Downing – seventeenth-century politician.
- Senator John Cherry Drennan CBE JP born 1899 died 1983) Drennan studied at Foyle College before working as a farmer in the Limavady area. He became active in the Ulster Unionist Party, and served for it in the Senate of Northern Ireland from 1961 until it was prorogued in 1972. Lord Lieutenant for County Londonderry 1965 - 1974.
- Very. Rev. Victor Griffin – formerly Dean of St Patrick's Cathedral, Dublin
- Ruth Kelly – Labour MP and former Cabinet Minister.
- Andrew Kinnear - (ca 1750 – 23 May 1818) was an Irish-born political figure in New Brunswick. He represented Westmorland in the Legislative Assembly of New Brunswick from 1786 to 1792.
- Senator John Andrew Long - Former Chairman of Limavady Rural Council and Northern Ireland Senator 1921-1941 (elected) Deputy Speaker 1927–28; Deputy Leader 1930–41, Parliamentary Secretary in the Department of the Prime Minister from 1930 to 1941.
- Charles Logue (1858–1919) - born Limavady, founded the Charles Logue Building Company in Boston. It constructed many churches, as well as Fenway Park baseball stadium.
- Professor Charles Gibson Lowry FRCOG (1880 - 1951) surgeon at the Royal Victoria Hospital and the Royal Maternity Hospital in Belfast. In 1921 he became professor of midwifery at Belfast and a Pro-Chancellor of, Queen's University, Belfast. He was a foundation fellow of the Royal College of Obstetricians and Gynaecologists. He served with the Royal Army Medical Corps during the First World War.
- Rt. Hon. William Lowry MP - (19 March 1884 – 14 December 1949) was an Irish barrister, judge, Ulster Unionist Party Member of Parliament, and Attorney General for Northern Ireland.
- William Ferguson Massey – 19th Prime Minister of New Zealand (from 1912 to 1925) was born and educated in the town before migrating.
- Thomas St George McCarthy (1862–1943) – was an Ireland rugby union international and founder member of the Gaelic Athletic Association. He also played soccer for Limavady FC when he was stationed in the town in 1888, and captained both the town's football and cricket clubs. He was a double winner of the County Londonderry senior cup in football and the inaugural County Londonderry Senior cricket cup final in 1888. He rose to become vice-president of the North West of Ireland Football Association and captain of the County Londonderry representative cricket side that played against the Northern Cricket Union.
- Rt. Hon. Maurice Marcus McCausland - He was High Sheriff of County Londonderry in 1908, and in 1926, he was appointed as Lord Lieutenant of County Londonderry, serving until his death. In 1934, he was appointed to the Privy Council of Northern Ireland.
- Judge John McCunn (1820–1872) Judge of the Superior Court New York from 1863 to 1870
- Jimmy McCurry (1830–1910) – folk musician, traditionally associated with the Londonderry Air.
- Gerry Mullan – Former Glentoran, Everton and Northern Ireland footballer.
- Sir David Ogilby (1755 - 1834) was born in Limavady, County Londonderry, and went to India to serve with the East India Company. After twenty-two years he was knighted and returned to Ireland. He wrote and published poems, which included translations of Indian poets, in Walker's Hibernian Magazine in 1804.
- John Scott Porter (31 December 1801 – 5 July 1880) educated locally and at the Royal Belfast Academical Institution. For a time he was a schoolteacher and edited The Christian Observer in London. In 1826 he became a Presbyterian minister, and from 1831 he had a congregation at Rosemary Street, Belfast. In 1838 he was appointed Professor of Theology and in 1851 Professor of Hebrew to the Association of Irish Non-Subscribing Presbyterians. He edited the Christian Moderator and the Bible Christian and was a prolific theological writer. Among his works was Principles of Textual Criticism, published in 1848. He was devoted to the preservation of the Irish language.
- William Porter – His Majesty's Attorney General at the Cape of Good Hope, South Africa
- William Preston – (25 December 1729 – 28 June 1783) was an Irish-born American military officer, planter and politician who founded a political dynasty.
- Dr. Muriel Robertson FRS, protozoologist and bacteriologist
- Willie Ross - Former Limavady Councillor and MP for Londonderry then East Londonderry 1974–2001.
- Thomas Teevan LLB MP - West Belfast MP and youngest Limavady Urban Council Chairman.
- Samuel Young (1822–1918), MP, was Limavady Brewery's founder.

== See also ==
- List of localities in Northern Ireland by population
