= Kinneir =

Kinneir is a surname. Notable people with this surname include:

- Jock Kinneir (1917–1994), British typographer and graphic designer
- John Macdonald Kinneir (1782–1830), Scottish army officer
- Septimus Kinneir (1871–1928), English cricketer

== See also ==
- Kinnear
