= Foyle College =

Location
- 67 Limavady Road; Derry, BT47 6LR; Northern Ireland; 55.00331°N 7.29331°W

Information
- Type: Grammar school
- Motto: Fostering Opportunities for Young Learners to Excel
- Established: 1617
- Founder: Mathias Springham
- Principal: Deirdre McLaughlin
- Gender: Co-educational
- Age: 11 to 18
- Enrolment: 850
- Houses: Lawrence, Duncreggan, Springham, Northlands
- Colours: Maroon, Blue & White
- Publication: Falcon - Foyle College Official News
- Board of Governors: Representatives from The Honourable The Irish Society, Department of Education, Foundation, Presbytery of Derry and Strabane, Diocese of Derry and Raphoe (Church of Ireland), University of Ulster, Old Boy's Association, Old Girl's Association, Staff & Parents.
- Website: sch.foylenet.org.uk

Foyle College is a co-educational non-denominational voluntary grammar school in Derry, Northern Ireland. The school's legal name is Foyle and Londonderry College. In 1976, two local schools, Foyle College and Londonderry High School, merged under the Foyle and Londonderry College Act 1976 (c. xviii) to form Foyle and Londonderry College. In 2011, the Board of Governors re-branded the school as 'Foyle College' and updated the school's crest.

== History ==
Foyle College and Londonderry High School have been providing education for young people in the Derry area and further afield for more than 400 years. In October 2007, the school celebrated its 390th anniversary with a plaque commemorating headmasters of the school since 1617. The school then celebrated their 400th anniversary, in 2017, with a service in St Columb's Cathedral on the official anniversary date of 3 March. a commemorative concert in Derry's Guildhall was held, a special dinner also took place. A proposed plaque is to be unveiled and many artifacts from Foyle College's past were exhibited in the Siege Museum, on Society Street, from April 2017 to October 2017. Many more commemorative events also took place throughout the course of 2017.

=== Foyle College ===
Londonderry School Act 1808
- Act of Parliament
- Parliament of the United Kingdom
- Long title: An Act to enable His Majesty to vest the Right of Appointment of Master of the Free School of Londonderry in the City and County of Londonderry, in the Bishop of Derry for the Time being.
- Citation: 48 Geo. 3. c. 77
- Territorial extent: United Kingdom

Dates
- Royal assent: 18 June 1808
- Commencement: 18 June 1808 (Note: The Acts of Parliament (Commencement) Act 1793.)
- Repealed: 7 August 1874
Other legislation
Repealed by	Foyle College Act 1874

Status: Repealed

Text of statute as originally enacted

Londonderry School Act 1809
- Act of Parliament
- Parliament of the United Kingdom
- Long title: An Act for vesting a Workhouse and Premises, situate in the City of Londonderry, in Trustees to be sold, and for applying the Purchase Money in building another School House, and for better regulating the same.
- Citation: 49 Geo. 3. c. lix
- Territorial extent: United Kingdom

Dates
- Royal assent: 12 May 1809
- Commencement: 12 May 1809
- Repealed: 7 August 1874
Other legislation
Repealed by	Foyle College Act 1874

Status: Repealed

Text of statute as originally enacted

Foyle College Act 1874 (Note: Section 1.)
- Act of Parliament
- Parliament of the United Kingdom
- Long title: An Act for the better management and regulation of Foyle College in the city of Londonderry, and for vesting in the governing body of such College the present schoolhouse and premises belonging to such College, and for vesting the right of appointment of head-master of such College in the Bishop of Derry and Raphoe and the Governor of the Honourable the Irish Society.
- Citation: 37 & 38 Vict. c. 79
- Territorial extent: United Kingdom

Dates
- Royal assent: 7 August 1874
- Commencement: 7 August 1874 (Note: Section 2.)
- Repealed: 1 July 1896
Other legislation
Repeals/revokes	Londonderry School Act 1808; Londonderry School Act 1809
Repealed by	Foyle College Act 1896

Status: Repealed

Text of statute as originally enacted

Foyle College traces its origins to 1617 and the establishment of the Free Grammar School at Society Street within the city walls of Derry by Mathias Springham of the Merchant Taylors' Company of London. The original building had the following Latin inscription over the main doorway: 'Mathias Springham, A.R. ad honorem dei et bonarum, literarum propogationem, hanc scholam fundavit anno salutis, M.D.C.XVII'. The Free School was built to "the honour of God and the spreading of good literature".

The school received no endowment from that company or from The Honourable The Irish Society (the body charged with the plantation of the County of Londonderry in the 17th century). There followed an ongoing dispute between the Irish Society and the Church of Ireland Bishop of Derry as to who had the authority to appoint the headmaster. The former because one of its representatives had founded the school and the latter because it held the school to be one of the diocesan grammar schools provided for by statute (the Free Schools Act 1570 (12 Eliz. 1. c. 1 (I)). This was only resolved in the early 19th century by an act of Parliament, the Londonderry School Act 1808 (48 Geo. 3. c. 77).

The old school within the city walls eventually outlived its usefulness, and in 1814 came the move to the newly erected and well-proportioned Georgian building set on a height above the Strand outside the city walls, designed by the architect, John Bowden (who had also designed the Courthouse in Derry, St George's Church, High Street, Belfast, and St Stephen's Church ['the Pepper Canister Church'] on Mount Street on Dublin's Southside). The school took the name 'Foyle College' in 1814. The story goes that one of the boarders, George Fletcher Moore, proposed to the other pupils "to christen the new school, Foyle College" which was seconded and carried with repeated "acclamations".

Foyle College Act 1896
- Act of Parliament
- Parliament of the United Kingdom
- Long title: An Act for the amalgamation of Foyle College and the Londonderry Academical Institution.
- Citation: 59 & 60 Vict. c. cxxxi
- Territorial extent: United Kingdom

Dates
- Royal assent: 20 July 1896
- Commencement: 1 July 1896 (Note: Section 57.)
Other legislation
Repeals/revokes	Foyle College Act 1874
Amended by	Foyle College (Amendment) Act (Northern Ireland) 1965
Repealed by	Foyle and Londonderry College Act 1976

Status: Repealed

Text of statute as originally enacted

For 30 years, from 1868, Foyle College had to compete with a vigorous rival in the Londonderry Academical Institution. This school, established by a body of influential local merchants, moved in 1871 from East Wall to a new site in Academy Road. The Honourable The Irish Society, which contributed to the funds of both schools, proposed a scheme of amalgamation, and negotiations finally resulted in the passing of the Foyle College Act 1896 (59 & 60 Vict. c. cxxxi), the united school retaining the name and with it claiming the traditions of the older school.

Foyle then had the use of the buildings at Lawrence Hill and Academy Road. Following the Second World War, and as a consequence of the many changes brought about by the Education Act (Northern Ireland) 1947, the governors acquired a site at Springtown on Northland Road, overlooking the school playing‑fields, to build a new school. This was opened on 2 May 1968 by The Duke of Kent.

=== Londonderry High School ===
Like Foyle College, Londonderry High School owed its existence to the merging of two independent institutions. The first of these, the Ladies' Collegiate School, was set up in 1877 by the Misses McKillip - pioneers in the movement for higher education for women in Ireland. Their vision and drive resulted in the starting of a school at 11 Queen Street. Two further moves saw the renamed Victoria High School located in Crawford Square, where boarding and day pupils were accommodated. The nearby Northlands School of Housewifery (1908) was associated with Victoria High School.

At the top of Lawrence Hill, Miss J. Kerr had opened St. Lurach's College circa 1900 - this school also took boarders. Strand House School (1860) closed during the First World War and the girls mostly went to Victoria or St. Lurach's. In 1922 Victoria High School and St. Lurach's amalgamated to form Londonderry High School. By 1928 Duncreggan, formerly the home of the late William Tillie, Lord Lieutenant of the City of Londonderry, had been purchased and the boarders were transferred there from St. Lurach's. In the immediate post-war period there was an ever-growing need for increased educational facilities. The high point of an ambitious and forward-looking programme was undoubtedly the opening of the new £150,000 building extensions between Duncreggan House and Dunseverick.

Foyle and Londonderry College Act 1976 (Note: Section 1(1).)
- Act of Parliament
- Parliament of the United Kingdom
- Long title: An Act to provide for the amalgamation of Foyle College and Londonderry High School; and for other purposes.
- Citation: 1976 c. xviii
- Territorial extent: United Kingdom

Dates
- Royal assent: 22 July 1976
- Commencement: 1 August 1976 (Note: Section 1(2).)
Other legislation
Repeals/revokes	Foyle College Act 1896; Foyle College (Amendment) Act (Northern Ireland) 1965

Status: Current legislation

Text of statute as originally enacted

The new buildings were opened by Her Grace The Duchess of Abercorn in May 1962, and on the same day the then Permanent Secretary to the Ministry of Education announced that a new block would be erected to house the Preparatory Department, and this followed in 1964. In 1974 the girls joined the boys of Foyle College Preparatory Department which moved into these premises in 1974, and so anticipated the later amalgamation under the Foyle and Londonderry College Act 1976 (c. xviii), resulting in the first co-educational grammar school in Derry. The Preparatory Department closed in 2003.

== Present ==
In 2019 the school relocated to a new £24 million single campus on the Limavady Road at the site of the former US Naval Communications Station. This meant that for the first time in 50 years, all the pupils in Foyle College were on one site. As a grammar school it admits pupils based on academic selection. The school joined the Association for Quality Education (AQE) which requires prospective pupils to take the AQE Common Entrance exam in order to be admitted to the college from 2010. In 2010 the results of pupils who sat the AQE entrance exam were published. Of successful applicants to Foyle College, only 11 out of the 126 who were admitted into Year 8 achieved the top grade Q1, but 40 pupils who received the lowest grade Q4 were admitted.

In 2011, a re-brand of the school was carried out by the schools governors to reputedly reflect popular usage in the city of Derry, where the school is almost universally known as Foyle College. However, although the school's name and crest was re-branded, the college's legal name will continue to be Foyle and Londonderry College.

Deep-seated objections with regard to the school's name change have been made to the local press by members of the Londonderry High School Old Girls Association. They claim the change of the college's name amounts to a jettisoning of the link from the former all-girls school, Londonderry High School, and that the name change has been taken by the governors without any real consultation with them.

All the core subjects, as well as a number of options, are offered up until the end of Key Stage 3. Pupils then sit GCSEs. With suitable grades, they have the option to study AS and A2 levels in the Sixth Form.

The school is officially non-denominational.

== Houses ==
Pupils are assigned to one of four houses in the first year. Houses are primarily for Sports Day and inter-house sports tournaments. The school tie has stripes which indicate which house a pupil belongs to. The houses are as follows:

- Lawrence - Named in honour of notable alumnus The 1st Baron Lawrence, a Viceroy of India (blue stripes).
- Duncreggan - Representing Duncreggan House, where the Senior School was located before the move to Limavady Road, i.e. the site of the pre-amalgamation Londonderry High School (red stripes).
- Springham - Named in honour of the founder of the Free Grammar School, Mathias Springham (yellow stripes).
- Northlands - The area where the Junior School was located i.e. the site of the pre-amalgamation Foyle College (green stripes).

Pupils who only have white stripes in their ties have received colours awards from the school for participation in extracurricular activities such as rugby, hockey, music etc. The sports and music ties have symbols relevant to the activity for which the colours tie has been awarded, e.g. music is represented by stylised treble clefs.

== Extracurricular ==
Action from a FALC rugby match, January 2005.

A scene from the 2005 school production of Me and My Girl

=== Sport ===
The most popular sports in the school include rugby union (which has seen three tours to Australia and the South Pacific) and hockey (which toured to Barcelona in 2006). The rugby team (as Foyle College) has twice won the Ulster Schools Cup; in 1915 beating The Royal School, Armagh, and in 1900 beating Methodist College, Belfast. It has been a runner up on three occasions. Foyle and Londonderry College's most recent rugby silverware was won in the 2007-2008 season; FALC defeated Cambridge House at Ravenhill to win the Ulster Schools Bowl to win this competition for the second time in three years after beating Limavady Grammar in the 2005-2006 season again at Ravenhill. In hockey, the school has won the Ulster Cup twice, most recently in 2009 after beating Ballymena Academy 1–0, and reached the final on two other occasions. They won the Plate in 2006, and again in 2007.

Cricket is the main summer sport. In 2003 FALC won the Ulster Bank Schools' Cup defeating local rivals Strabane Grammar by two wickets. The Headmaster has popularised the sport of fencing within the school, producing UK and Irish champions.

Football is another sport that has been recently made available for pupils in Foyle, with three teams competing in the annual Northern Ireland School's Cup competition, at U14, U16 and U18 level.

=== Music ===
The choir compete at the annual Sainbury's School Choir of the Year. The musicals are every two years with the break years being filled with non-musicals such as A Midsummer Night's Dream. Past musicals have included Annie, Oliver, The Mikado, Bugsy Malone, Me and My Girl, Calamity Jane, We Will Rock You, Hairspray and most recently Footloose.

== Notable pupils ==
- Sir Michael Alexander, a former British Ambassador to NATO and a former British Ambassador to Austria
- Eva Birthistle, actress (Ae Fond Kiss); moved to Derry at the age of 14.
- Amanda Burton, actress
- Ivan Cooper, politician, leading member of the Northern Ireland Civil Rights Movement, and co-founder of the Social Democratic and Labour Party (SDLP)
- Mark Daley, Irish-American broadcaster
- George Farquhar, Irish dramatist
- William Percy French, songwriter
- Ken Goodall, former rugby union international
- W.M. Gorman, Irish economist
- James Gwyn, Brevet Major General in the Union Army
- Neil Hannon, musician from art-pop band "The Divine Comedy" (attended Preparatory Department)
- Brigadier-General Sir Henry Lawrence, soldier/statesman in British India
- The Rt Hon. The 1st Baron Lawrence, P.C., Viceroy of India (1864–1869)
- Seamus Mallon, current Rugby Union player
- Stanley Mitchell, first-class cricketer and former president of the Irish Cricket Union
- George Fletcher Moore, prominent early settler in Western Australia
- Johan Thoning Owesen, Irish-Norwegian shipowner and philanthropist
- The Rt Hon. Sir Robert Porter, PC (NI), QC, former Minister of Home Affairs (1969 - 1970), politician, barrister and judge
- The Rt Hon. Sir John Ross, 1st Bt, P.C. (I.), K.C., last Lord Chancellor of Ireland (1921–1922)
- Leah Totton, cosmetic doctor who gained fame as the winner of the ninth series of the BBC One television programme, The Apprentice
- Claude Wilton, lawyer and civil rights activist

== See also ==
- List of the oldest schools in the United Kingdom
