= Limavady High School =

Coordinates: 55.048°N 6.948°W

Location
- Irish Green Street; Limavady, County Londonderry, BT49 9AN; United Kingdom

Information
- Type: High School
- Established: 1961
- Specialist: Visual Arts and Performance
- Head teacher: D Mornin
- Gender: Co-educational
- Colours: Red, Black, Yellow
- Website: http://www.limavadyhigh.co.uk

Limavady High School is a secondary school in the Limavady, County Londonderry, Northern Ireland. It currently has around 800 pupils enrolled. The school is part of the Limavady Learning Partnership.

== History ==
Opened in 1961, the school occupied the buildings in Irish Green Street formerly used by Limavady Grammar School, adapted for the school's use and augmented. These premises have either been completely refurbished or replaced and now provide modern teaching areas. In September 2001 the former Dungiven High School was absorbed into Limavady High School.

In 2006 the school received specialist school status in the visual and performing arts and received a sum of money to be used for the purpose. The school introduced new GCSE subjects such as dance and journalism and introduced new technologies such as plasma screen TV's and video cameras to record and produce video material so that it can be viewed by staff and pupils in the corridors.

== Technology in the school ==
The school utilises a range of new technology to enhance and educate. This includes 3 plasma screen TVs – broadcasting pupils work, a series of MiniDV and HDD video cameras, digital stills cameras, C2k managed PCs and Laptops, and more recently a new stage lighting and audio installation and a new Moving Image Arts/Media Studies classroom with 24 high spec computers especially for video editing.

== Rock Challenge 2008 ==
Limavady High School participated for the first time in the Rock Challenge dance competition. The school competed with pupils from Limavady Grammar and St. Mary's High on 1 April at the Waterfront Hall, Belfast. The team consisted of 62 dancers, 10 costume/hair and make up artists, 20 stage crew and seven staff. The theme tune, named Crossing Bridges was composed by vice principal D. Dunlop and is based on the famous tune Danny Boy which originated from the local area. The Team won the PSNI Award for best Lighting Design and the Belfast City Council Award for Concept Originality.
