= William Boyd Kinnear =

Canadian politician

William Boyd Kinnear (October 2, 1796 – February 22, 1868) was a lawyer, judge and political figure in New Brunswick. He represented St. John County in the Legislative Assembly of New Brunswick from 1830 to 1834.

He was born in Dorchester, New Brunswick, the son of Andrew Kinnear, who served in the first assembly for the province, and Letitia Boyd, both Irish immigrants. Kinnear studied law with Charles Jeffery Peters and was called to the bar in 1819. In 1828, he was named recorder for Saint John. He married Janet Muir in 1830. In 1833, Kinnear was named a judge in the vice admiralty court and he was named to the province's Legislative Council in 1839. In 1846, he was named solicitor general for the province. He later served on a commission charged with the revision of the province's statutes and reviewing judicial procedures. A change in government in 1854 meant the end of his tenure as solicitor general and he returned to Saint John where he served as clerk of the peace and probate judge. Kinnear also served as a member of the senate for the University of New Brunswick. He died in Saint John at the age of 71.
