= St Mary's High School, Limavady =

Coordinates: 55.047°N 6.948°W

- 72-90 Irish Green Street, Limavady, County Londonderry; Northern Ireland

Information
- School type: Secondary
- Motto: Living Faith, Inspiring Learning, Shaping Futures
- Established: 1959
- Principal: S Mullan
- Chaplain: Mgr. Bryan McCanny
- Enrollment: 700 (approx.)
- Colours: Green,White
- Website: stmaryslimavady.com

St Mary's High School is a Catholic secondary school situated in the town of Limavady, County Londonderry.

== History ==
The school was established in 1959.

== Collaboration ==
St. Mary's is one of three secondary schools in Limavady, the others being Limavady High School and Limavady Grammar School. It collaborates with these schools and with St. Patrick College, Dungiven and Rossmar School in the Roe Valley Learning Community. Through this partnership, the schools offer shared courses and facilities for their students.

St Mary’s after years of shared education with Limavady High School the two schools came together to build the first shared education campus in Northern Ireland. Construction began in 2021 and was opened by First Minister Michelle O’Neil and Deputy First Minister Emma Little-Pengelly alongside education minister Paul givan in 2024. The campus consists of a state of the art STEM centre on the Limavady High School site and a Shared Sixth form centre and media studies department on the St Mary’s site.

== Academics ==
The school initially only provided instruction for students up to GCSE level. In 1975, 'A' level provision was introduced. St. Mary's now offers a full range of subjects at both GCSE and A-Level.

In 2017/2018, 73.7% of its students who sat the A-level exams were awarded three A*-C grades.

== School awards ==
- ICT Mark
- 2008, 2011 Investors in People
- 2010 Learning UK Post-Primary School of the Year
- Becta mark
- 2009 Microsoft IT Academy
- 2008 iNET
- 2009 Home school access award
- Health Promoting school award
