= Thoning Owesen =

Irish-Norwegian philanthropist (1804–1881)

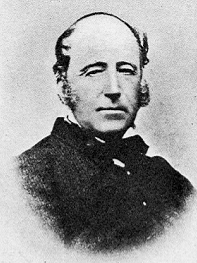
- Born: 27 March 1804; Dublin, Ireland
- Died: 1 March 1881 (aged 76); Trondheim, Norway
- Occupations: Landowner and philanthropist

Johan Thoning Widerøe Owesen (27 March 1804 in Dublin – 1 March 1881 in Trondheim) was an Irish-Norwegian philanthropist and landowner. He is most famous for his charitable legacy of £9.6 million, roughly 105 million Norwegian krone (2018 inflation), that he left after his death.

== Life and background ==
Owesen was born in Dublin to Trondheim timber merchant Otto Frederik Owesen, originally from Denmark, and his Irish wife Jane Allingham, aunt of the poet William Allingham.

Through his mother, Jane Allingham, Owesen was related to Mary Wollstonecraft, whose mother, Elizabeth Dickson, was a first cousin of his grandfather, John Allingham, via their shared grandparent Thomas Dickson, and to her daughters Mary Shelley and Fanny Imlay.

His father Otto returned to Trondheim with his mother and the young Thoning soon after his birth and named their house 'Ballyshannon', after Jane's birthplace.

After his mother's death from tuberculosis in 1807, when he was 3 years old, Owesen was sent to live with his mother's family in Ireland. He was raised in the household of his maternal grandparents as their son, and his uncles and aunts, despite being of varying ages, were sibling-like figures to him. Owesen never saw his father again as a result of the Gunboat War preventing sea travel from Ireland to Norway, and, on his father's death in 1812, when he was 8 years old, he inherited his father's estate, consisting of money, property and a prominent shipping business.

Owesen began his education at Foyle College in 1814 alongside his uncle (and brother by wardship) James Allingham and Henry Montgomery Lawrence. Whilst at school, Owesen's uncle Andrew Alexander Watt (1778–1851), who oversaw the family's eponymous distillery, acted as Owesen's guardian.

Owesen returned to Trondheim on holiday with his uncle (and brother by wardship) Edward Allingham in 1819, whereupon he was welcomed by his father's old friends and is said to have been convinced that Norway was his home. Two years later, in 1822, Owesen permanently relocated to Trondheim.

In 1829, he bought Leira Gård, an estate of 5,199 acres with 28 worker's cottages, which had historically belonged to the von Krogh family.

Owesen also owned 20,000 acres of forest in Tiller Municipality, Selbu Municipality, and Tydal Municipality.

Whilst being a conscientious landowner and respectful of his tenants, Owesen was also influential in public and social life. His parties in Norway were well attended, with two notable attendees being Prince Arthur, Duke of Connaught and Strathearn, and Alfred, Duke of Saxe-Coburg and Gotha.

He became a member of the Royal Norwegian Society of Sciences and Letters in 1858.

He died at his estate in 1881. His funeral procession in Trondheim consisted of one hundred carriages and vast crowds. His estate sold Leira in 1900.

== Philanthropy ==
Owesen is widely remembered for his philanthropy both during and after his lifetime. After his death, he left 334,000 Norwegian krone (£3.7 million or 40 million Norwegian krone in 2018) to enable the foundation of the Dalen Blindeskole, an institution for the blind, which was the first of its kind in Norway. Owesen also left a total of 528,780.58 Norwegian krone (£5.3 million in 2018) to causes including a children's home, restoration of Nidaros Cathedral, other religious causes, local causes and the benefit of the poor. Part of this money, 32,000 Norwegian krone (£356,421 in 2018), was left to his servants.

== Legacy ==
It is said that Owesen never married because of his dedication to public service and improving the conditions for the poorest in society.

Many of the causes to which Owesen donated still benefit from his financial legacy today.

A street in Trondheim, Thoning Owesens gate, is named after Owesen.

The Irish businessman Andrew Alexander Watt was his great-nephew, as was the politician Sir Anthony Babington.
