= Limavady Grammar School =

Location
- 4 Ballyquin Road; Limavady, County Londonderry, BT49 9ET; Northern Ireland; 55.03654°N 6.937909°W

Information
- Type: Grammar
- Motto: Latin: Vita, Veritas, Victoria (Life, Truth, Victory)
- Established: 1957; 69 years ago (present site)
- Local authority: WELB
- Principal: Chris O'Donnell
- Teaching staff: 54
- Gender: Co-educational
- Age range: 11-18
- Enrolment: 900
- Houses: Benbradagh; Benevenagh; Loughermore; Mullaghmore
- Colours: Royal Blue, Navy
- Website: www.limavadygrammar.org.uk

Limavady Grammar School is a co-educational 11-18 selective grammar school in Limavady, County Londonderry in Northern Ireland. Situated on the Ballyquin Road, it is close to other schools in the town, including Limavady High School and St. Mary's High School. In 2008, the school was placed 139th in The Times school league table for the UK, which is based on both GCSE and A-level results.

The school is non-denominational and features a broad mix of pupils from different communities in the County Londonderry area, and currently enrolls 910 pupils. The admission policy of the school is based on academic selection and Year 8 students are admitted in order of score in the AQE common entrance assessment.

Limavady Grammar School follows a common curriculum, with options added at GCSE and A-level. Due to the foundation of the Limavady Post-Primary Learning Partnership in 2002, A-level students can study certain subjects outside of school on link courses, with the other secondary schools in Limavady and the North West Regional College.

== History ==
The origin of Limavady Grammar School can be traced back to a late-nineteenth-century foundation. Founded in 1957, the school previously resided where the modern day Limavady High School is situated. The school moved to the present site on the Ballyquin Road. A major extension took place in 1982 when new science labs and a sports hall were built. A second extension comprising twenty-two classrooms including three information technology rooms was completed in 1998. It has won several awards such as Best Kept School in the North West of Northern Ireland, and the International Schools Award 2008.

== Curriculum ==
At Limavady Grammar School, pupils follow a common curriculum for their first three years at Key Stage 3. In the fourth year the curriculum is still general but certain options are introduced, and at the end of the 5th Form, pupils sit the examination for the Northern Ireland GCSE. Pupils may then begin study for the AS/A2 levels, leave school and study full-time at a Further Education College, take up apprenticeship, or begin work. The subjects which are available at Key Stage 3 level are:

- English
- Mathematics
- Biology
- Chemistry
- Physics
- Religious Studies
- Technology & Design
- Geography
- Physical Education
- History
- Art & Design
- Music
- Home Economics
- French
- Spanish (Year 9 onwards)
- ICT

In their fourth year, pupils begin studying for GCSEs. All the subjects previously mentioned are retained, with the following extra options introduced:

- Computing
- Additional Mathematics
- English Literature
- Health and Social Care
- Statistics
- Single award science
- Double award science

After completion of the GCSEs, students may decide to continue at school to study at AS/A2 level. Here, the school in cooperation with the RVLC, introduces the following additional subjects for study:

- Further Mathematics
- Engineering (NWRC)
- Moving Image Arts (Limavady High School)
- Government and Politics
- Performing Arts (Limavady High School)
- Software Systems Development
- Technology: Systems & Control
- Technology: Product Design
- Construction and Built Environment (NWRC)

=== Examination results ===
Limavady Grammar School has consistently been ranked highly among schools. It is currently ranked 139th in the UK, and 14th in Northern Ireland. This is a drop from 2007, when the school was ranked 96th in the UK.

Year	GCSE Rank	A-level Rank	Overall UK Ranking
2005	118th	62nd	
2006	170th	103rd	
2007	105th	99th	96th
2008	119th	175th	139th

== Principals ==
No.	Name	Tenure
1	Stanley Clayden	1957-1969
2	Jimmy Kane	1969–1975
3	Robert Matier	1975–1997
4	Sam McGuinness	1997–2008
5	Robert Wilson	2009–2016
6	Nicola Madden	2016–2026
7	Chris O'Donnell	2026–present

== Sports ==
=== Rugby ===
Rugby is the main boys sport at the school. The school usually has two teams at each age level from U12 to Medallion level, with a 1st XV, a 2nd XV at senior school. The Medallion XV is coached by Mr Bogle with the 1st XV coached by Mr Hughes and Mr Nash. In the past, the school has had players who have represented the province at underage level such as Out Half Niall O'Connor represented both Ireland U19 and Ireland U20 in 2007 and has recently signed a contract extension with Ulster Rugby until 2011. The biggest honour goes to past pupil Derek McAleese who gained one cap for Ireland against France in 1992 and played many times for Ulster. Many students go on to play rugby for City of Derry RFC, who play in the Ulster Senior League and in the AIB All Ireland Division 3 or Limavady Rugby Club who play in the Kukri Qualifying League.

The school teams have been on many tours, mostly to South Africa, Scotland, Rep. of Ireland, England and Canada, the last being to South Africa in 2012. The school takes part in the Danske Bank Medallion Shield competition and in the Danske Bank Schools Cup for 1st XV. The school also takes part in the 2nd XV and 3rd XV cups.

=== Other sports ===
There is a range of sports available throughout the school. These include:

- Hockey - the main girls sport
- Football - alternative sport for girls
- Football - alternative winter boys sport
- Cricket - summer sport for boys and girls
- Netball - alternative girls sport
- Tennis
- Athletics
- Surf Club

==== Gaelic football controversy ====
In May 2008 the school was involved in a controversy over the provision of Gaelic football when the Gaelic Athletic Association claimed a training session arranged at the school was cancelled after objections from parents and teachers. The school principal, Dr. Sam McGuinness, claimed he knew nothing about the meeting, but said that Gaelic Games would be made available throughout the Roe Valley learning association in September 2008, therefore as an option for 6th form students only.

=== Astroturf pitch ===
On 14 September 2007, Limavady Grammar School opened its new synthetic astroturf sports pitch. It was opened by the Mayor of Limavady, Cllr. Edwin Stevenson and Minister for Sport, Edwin Poots MLA. The pitch was funded by the Big Lottery Fund, which awarded £585,000 and Limavady Borough Council, which donated £50,000. The pitch is available for use by schools in Limavady and the surrounding area and various clubs and associations, day and evening.

== Extra curricular activities ==
The school offers a range of extra-curricular activities. The most prominent of these are Rugby, Hockey and the Duke of Edinburgh Award, where the majority of students take part in these. A range of other sports, such as Athletics, Badminton, Cricket, Golf, Netball, Soccer, Swimming, Chess and Tennis are also on offer throughout the course of the year. All the sports are run by teachers, with additional assistant coaches in the case of Rugby and Hockey. Gaelic Sports are available at KS4 and KS5 in collaboration with RVLC schools.

The school also has a broad musical programme with activities such as Choir, Orchestra, Jazz Band, Guitar Club, Brass Band and the Traditional Music Group, all available to students. The Choir and Musical Bands actively take part in concerts and festivals, notably the Jazz Band in the Limavady Jazz & Blues Festival.

Limavady Grammar also has a range of clubs involved with the Arts including the Craft Club, Photography, Pottery, the Art Club, Drama and Public Speaking. Clubs associated closely with subjects include Chemistry Club, Technology Club, Computer Club and the afore mention Art Club. Languages also influence some of the clubs such as Exchange Visits and Cultural Activities. The School also has two debating Societies, one in English and another in French. The French Debating Society were the 2006, 2007, 2009 and 2010 Northern Ireland NICILT Post-16 French Debating Champions.

As well as those previously mentioned, the school also has its own Charity Committee, School Magazine Committee, and Scripture Union. It also runs the School Bank in association with the Danske Bank.

=== Duke of Edinburgh Award ===
The School annually operates the Duke of Edinburgh Award Scheme. Year 10 pupils are introduced to the Award by a short 3-day residential style event held at White Park Bay, County Antrim at the end of their school year. Year 11 pupils then begin their course the following year with the Silver Award. The award attracts large interest, with many pupils completing their Gold Award. The teacher-in-charge, Mr Bogle, is assisted by other staff members who are recipients of the award, through the course of the year.

== Technology ==
In 2005, the school installed a plasma screen, which displays information regarding current school activities and more recently world affairs. The school contains four computer suites and as of 2007, classrooms were fitted with Smartboards, consisting of an interactive whiteboard, projector and computer. The school uses the C2k network, running C2k-managed Windows XP PCs supplied by RM plc and Dell. At the start of the 2008-2009 Academic year, Dell laptops were made available for both student and teacher use.

== Schools' Entrance Assessment Group (SEAG) ==
In November 2023, prospective pupils sat the first Schools' Entrance Assessment Group (SEAG) test since it had replaced the Association of Quality Education (AQE) test. There are currently 63 member schools that take part in the SEAG test, all of which offer the assessment to be taken at their school. The test is sat in two sittings in November and results are issued the following January, and can be accessed online. This test allows pupils to enter any academically selective school in Northern Ireland that is a member of the group.

== Notable former pupils ==
- Thomas Teevan - Ulster Unionist West Belfast MP and Limavady Urban Council Chairman
- Norma Reid Birley - Former Principal of the University of the Witwatersrand.
- Niall O'Connor - Ulster and Ireland rugby player
- Jason Smyth - Double gold medal-winning and Double World Record Holder Paralympian
- Chloe MacCombe - Northern Irish paratriathlete and Commonwealth Games silver medalist.
