= Jane Ross (collector) =

Irish folksong collector (1810–1879)

- Born: 5 August 1810; Limavady, County Londonderry
- Died: 28 February 1879 (aged 68); Limavady, County Londonderry
- Occupation: Folksong collector

Jane Ross (5 August 1810 – 28 February 1879) was an Irish folksong collector from Limavady, County Londonderry, Ireland. She is most notable for collecting the tune that became Londonderry Air.

== Early life and family ==
Jane Ross was born in or near Limavady, County Londonderry on 5 August 1810. She was the eldest of the four daughters and two sons of John Ross (1781–1830) and his second wife Jane (née Ogilby). Her siblings were Elizabeth, William, Ann, Theodosia and John. Her father was captain in the Limavady yeomanry and owner of land, flour mills, and a bleach green. Her brother William (born 1814) became rector of Dungiven and later canon of Derry cathedral. Her paternal grandfather, William Ross, was a land agent for the Conolly estate, provost of Limavady from 1789, and a linen merchant. Through both her parents she was related to other local gentry families.

== Music collecting ==
Ross lived with some of her sisters in Limavady at 51 Main Street. Around 1853 she collected a number of traditional songs and airs from her local area and sent them to George Petrie, the Dublin-based folk music collector. He published them with other songs as Ancient music of Ireland (1855). The air, which became known as Londonderry Air or the Derry air, was published unnamed without lyrics as a melody for the piano. It gained popularity, with a number of composers producing their own arrangements, the most notable with the words written by Fred Weatherly in 1912, which is better known that the Alfred Perceval Graves version. Weatherly put the lyrics of his song Danny Boy to the air, which became a popular song given the themes of emigration of loss and connections to the experience of the Irish diaspora.

There are a number of views on the age and origin of the Londonderry Air, but there is a lack of evidence to settle the case. Some believe that Ross altered the original melody to her taste, with others think that Ross wrote it herself and claimed it was older. The majority of scholars agree that Ross heard a musician play a melody similar to that collected by Edward Bunting from Denis Hempson. Despite varying theories about the composer of the air, Ross is given the credit for collecting it.

== Death and legacy ==
Ross died on 28 February 1879 at Main Street, Limavady, and was buried in Christchurch Church of Ireland graveyard, Limavady. Her death was registered by her brother William. A plaque was erected in her memory on her home in Limavady at 51 Main Street, and an annual music festival is held in her honour. The Royal Irish Academy holds the music Ross collected and sent to Petrie. In 1998 the Ross Archives were compiled.
