= Roe Valley Country Park =

Park in Northern Ireland

Coordinates: 55.025°N 6.939°W

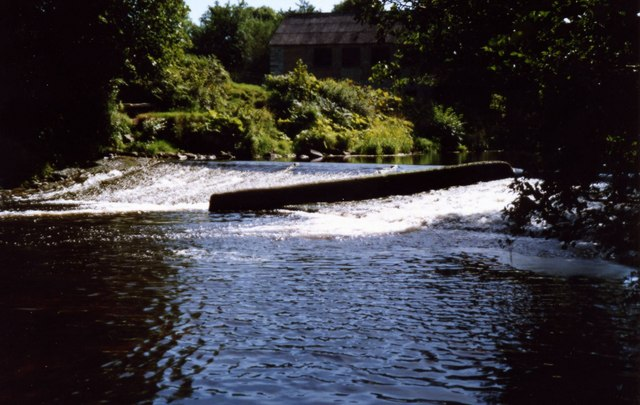
Weir in Roe Valley Country Park.

The Roe Valley Country Park is a forested area containing part of the River Roe, south west of Limavady, County Londonderry, Northern Ireland. It is maintained by the Northern Ireland Environment Agency, which is part of the Department of the Environment of Northern Ireland.

The park is approximately three miles (4.8 km) long and consists of mainly deciduous, riparian woodland on each side of the Roe. The terrain next to the river is mostly steep sided gorge, with some areas of flat grassland on the northwest bank. As the river has a large, freely draining catchment area, it significantly increases in volume and speed soon after heavy rain. This is most visible around the visitor centre, where the river is forced through a narrow section of the gorge. The river is known for the legend of the dog who leaped the river Roe, fleeing enemies to warn the O'Cahan's of Limavady of danger via a message in its mouth.

== Attractions ==
A visitor centre provides managerial office space, a cafe, exhibition space and a presentation area.

The area around the visitor centre contains the Green Lane Museum, with exhibits on local history, the area linen industry, agriculture and artefacts of rural life.

In the 18th century, the local linen industry was based on the same site, the remains of which include flax drying fields with watch towers, derelict buildings and a waterwheel originally used to power the machinery.

There is also a disused hydroelectric generating station which was the first to operate in Northern Ireland in 1896.

== Recreational activities ==
Fishing on the river for salmon and brown trout is allowed with a permit. Parts of the river containing rapids and weirs are used for kayaking, although the park officially bans boats and canoes. Scrambling on the rock faces at O'Cahan's Rock has also been restricted. The section of river below O'Cahan's Rock, consisting of a bridge and weir, is used for swimming. The forest is used for orienteering by local clubs and schools in Limavady.

The river is bridged at several points through the park, although only the bridge by the visitor centre is suitable for vehicles. There are footbridges below the O'Cahan's Rock car park, below O'Cahan's Rock itself, at Carrick Mills and below Carrick Church.

The Green Lane Museum closes for winter, and reopens around Easter. It is advisable to contact staff before visiting to check opening hours.
