= County Coleraine =

Defunct administrative area in Ireland

Coordinates: 55.132°N 6.668°W

- Former County of Ireland
- 1585–1613
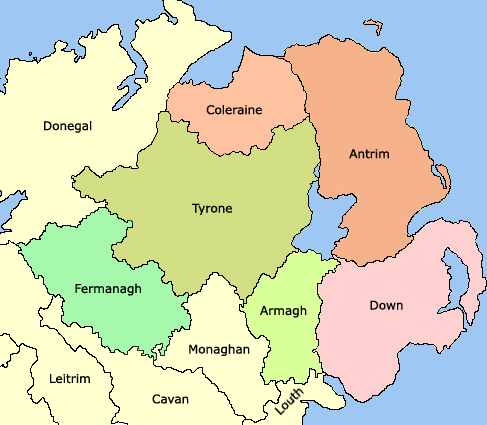
- Map of Ulster in 1585
- Capital: Coleraine
- Government
- Governor
  - 1611: Thomas Phillips
- Historical era: Tudor conquest of Ireland
  - Established: 1585
  - Incorporated into County Londonderry: 1613
Preceded by	Succeeded by
O'Cahan	County Londonderry
- Today part of: Northern Ireland

County Coleraine, called the County of Colerain in the earliest documents, was one of the counties of Ireland from 1585 to 1613. It was named after its intended county town, Coleraine. It was later subsumed into County Londonderry along with a big part of the once larger County Tyrone and small territories from County Donegal and County Antrim.

== Foundation and extent ==
Sir John Perrot, the Lord Deputy of Ireland, established County Coleraine between the Rivers Bann and Foyle in 1585 during the reign of Elizabeth I. Sir John intended administering the new county from the town of Coleraine. In the event, the English authorities built the courthouse and jail for the new establishment at Desertmartin in the adjacent county of Tyrone. Sir Thomas Phillips was appointed Governor of the County of Coleraine in 1611.

Flint tools discovered nearby to Coleraine, dating to around 7000 BCE, represent the earliest known signs of human presence in Ireland.

== Towards a new county ==
English control of the territory remained nominal until after the Nine Years' War. Following the Flight of the Earls (1607) and O'Doherty's Rebellion (1608), the lands the Irish aristocrats held were escheated to the Crown. In 1609 the territory was given to the City of London Corporation and its livery companies, who received instructions to undertake its plantation.

The area for planting included:

- the entirety of County Coleraine
- the barony of Loughinsholin which comprised the then north of County Tyrone and the environs of Coleraine in County Antrim, together called O'Cahan's Country
- a small area of County Donegal around Lough Foyle

In 1613, this larger area became incorporated into the newly founded County Londonderry, named after the titular new city, although its county town was Coleraine.
