= Roe Valley Arts & Cultural Centre =

Municipal Building in Limavady, Northern Ireland

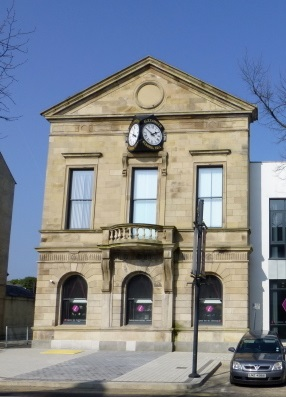
- The old town hall, now part of the Roe Valley Arts & Cultural Centre

- Shown in Northern Ireland
- 55.0520°N 6.9525°W
- Location: Main Street, Limavady

History
- Built: 1872

Site notes
- Architect(s): Turner & Williamson
- Architectural style: Neoclassical style
- Website: www.roevalleyarts.com

Listed Building – Grade B1
- Official name: Town Hall
- Designated: 28 March 1975
- Reference no.: HB 02/12/004

The Roe Valley Arts & Cultural Centre, formerly the Alexander Memorial Hall and originally Limavady Town Hall, is a civic venue in Main Street in Limavady, County Londonderry, Northern Ireland. The structure, which incorporates the façade of the old town hall, was previously a Grade B1 listed building but was delisted in July 1998 to facilitate the demolition of the structure behind the façade and the subsequent erection of a new cultural centre.

== History ==
The first municipal building in the town was a courthouse in Irish Green Street designed by Robert Given and completed in 1830. In the mid-19th century civic leaders decided to procure a dedicated civic venue for the town: the site they selected was on the north side of Main Street. The new building was designed by a local firm of architects, Turner & Williamson, in the neoclassical style, built by Samuel Mercer in ashlar stone at a cost of £2,000 and was completed in 1872. The design involved a symmetrical main frontage with three bays facing onto Main Street; the ground floor was rusticated with three round headed openings, the left hand one being used as a doorway. The central opening, which slightly projected forward, was flanked by pilasters with corbels above supporting a semi-circular stone balcony with balustrading. On the first floor there were three sash windows with cornices and at roof level there was a pediment with a blind oculus in the tympanum.

Following the death of the former High Sheriff of County Londonderry, Samuel Maxwell Alexander, of Roe Park, in 1886, civic leaders decided to rename the building the Alexander Memorial Hall. A clock, which displayed two canted faces and was inscribed with the new name of the building, was added to the front elevation at around that time. The Prime Minister of New Zealand, William Massey, who had been born in Limavady, returned to his home town for a dinner in his honour in the building in November 1916 during the First World War.

The building continued to serve as the main civic venue for Limavady Urban District Council for much of the 20th century but ceased to be the local seat of government after the enlarged Limavady Borough Council was established in offices at Connell Street in the 1970s.

The condition of the building deteriorated in the 1980s and 1990s and it was removed from the database of listed buildings by the Department of the Environment in July 1998 to facilitate the demolition of the structure behind the façade and the subsequent erection of a new cultural centre: the necessary demolition work was completed in 2007. After the subsequent work, which involved the erection of a new structure behind the old façade as well as the creation of an entirely new modern structure to the east of the old building, was completed at a cost of £4 million, the new building was officially re-opened by the broadcaster, Mark Carruthers, as the Roe Valley Arts & Cultural Centre in March 2011. Despite a proposal by Democratic Unionist Party councillors in January 2016 that the name of the complex revert to the old name i.e. the Alexander Memorial Hall, the building continues to be known as the Roe Valley Arts & Cultural Centre.
