= Mathias Springham =

English merchant (1561–1620)

Mathias Springham (1561–1620) was an English merchant who was involved with the plantation of Ulster. He was the brother of Richard Springham of Kingsclere, Hampshire (died 1620).

== Merchant Taylor ==
Presented to the Merchant Taylors' Company of London by Charles Hoskyns in 1588, he was appointed Chief Butler for the occasion in 1607 upon which James I, the queen and prince were banqueted at the Company Hall, and supplied a requisition of 19 ells of taffeta to clothe the three singers brought into the feast in a ship. He served with Isaack Holloway as First and Second Warden in 1615–16, and he became Master of that Company (as successor to Charles Hoskyns) in 1617–18.

== Ulster ==
Active in commissions to the plantation in Ulster from 1613 (as assistant to Alderman George Smith), in 1617 he founded the Free Grammar School in Society Street, Derry, now Foyle and Londonderry College, for 'the honour of God and the spreading of good literature'.

He was survived by his wife, his son and heir Henry, and his daughters Anne Cutts and Mary Purkell.
