= Jimmy McCurry =

Irish fiddler (b. 1830, d. 1910)

Jimmy McCurry (James McCurry, 1830–1910), also known as Blind Jimmy McCurry or the Blind Fiddler from Myroe, was a blind Irish fiddler, singer and songwriter from Myroe in County Londonderry.

== Life ==
James McCurry, one of six children of John and Isabella McCurry, was born in 1830, in Carrowclare, County Londonderry. He was blind from birth. He married Elizabeth Forrest, but she died not long after their marriage. Their only child, a daughter, died at the age of twelve. Jimmy lived to the age of 80, dying in the Limavady workhouse on 26 October 1910. Three days later he was buried in an unmarked grave in the churchyard of Tamlaght Finlagan Parish Church.

== Repertoire ==
None of his songs was transcribed or recorded in his lifetime, but three were published by Sam Henry in the Northern Constitution in the 1920s. These and several other songs survived in the repertoires of later local singers, such as John Fleming and Eddie Butcher, and were recorded on tape between 1954 and 1975 by Hugh Shields. These recordings are now held by the Ulster Folk and Transport Museum and in the Hugh Shields Collection at the Irish Traditional Music Archive.

There is clear element of satire in his songs, aimed at people whom his audience would have known. The many personal allusions, are, "if not malicious, at least intended to raise a laugh at the expense of the persons named."

== The Londonderry Air ==
Local tradition now identifies Jimmy as the musician whose performance in Limavady of the Londonderry Air, the melody of Danny Boy, was heard and transcribed by Jane Ross in 1851. However, this tradition is first mentioned by Sam Henry, well after Jimmy's death, and has been called into question.

== Songs ==
Seven of Jimmy McCurry's songs have survived:

- "Ballycarton Ball"
- "Killyclare (The Maid of Carrowclare)"
- "The Maid of the Foyle"
- "Coleraine Regatta"
- "The Myroe Ploughing Match"
- "Sarah Jane"
- "The Star of Moville"

There is evidence of a number of other songs, which, however have not survived:

- A song mentioned by Sam Henry, which "included the names of no less than twenty-five William Moores, all presbyterians resident in Myroe."
- "Paídín Rua", an abusive song about a woman who had offended him.
- A song "devoted to two girls by the name of McCausland bathing in the River Roe".
- A song about a trick played on him by a man named Phillips.
- A song about a Mrs Simpson, who gave him some unsatisfactory buttermilk.
- A song about Liz O'Neill's digestive problem with Kerry Blue potatoes.

== Sources ==
- Audley, Brian (2002). "The Londonderry Air: facts and fiction". Archived from the original on 30 September 2005.
- Forrest, Bobby. "The Forrest Family of Limavady and the Roe valley, c. 1655-1918" (PDF). Forrest Research Services.
- Hunter, Jim (n.d.). "The story of Danny Boy". Ulster Ancestry.
- Hunter, Jim (1997). The Blind Fiddler from Myroe. University of Ulster.
- Huntington, Gail; Herrmann, Lani (2010). Sam Henry's Songs of the People. Athens, Georgia: University of Georgia. ISBN 978--0-8203-3625-1.
- "Catalogue". Irish Traditional Music Archive.
- McCourt, Malachy (2013). Danny Boy: The Legend Of The Beloved Irish Ballad. Philadelphia: Running Press. ISBN 978-0-7624-5500-3.
- Shields, Hugh (1979). "New dates for old songs, 1766–1803". Long Room. 18–19: 41.
- Shields, Hugh (1981a). "A Singer of Poems: Jimmy McCurry of Myroe". Ulster Folklife. 27: 1–18.
- Shields, Hugh (1981b). Shamrock, Rose and Thistle: Folk Singing in North Derry. Dundonald: Blackstaff. Archived from the original on 20 June 2019.
