= Charles Gibson Lowry =

Charles Gibson Lowry by Herbert James Gunn. Oil on canvas, Queen's University Belfast.

Charles Gibson Lowry FRCOG (1880–1951) was an Irish surgeon. Educated at Foyle College and Queen’s College Belfast, he was surgeon at the Royal Victoria Hospital and the Royal Maternity Hospital in Belfast. In 1921 he became professor of midwifery at Belfast. He was a foundation fellow of the Royal College of Obstetricians and Gynaecologists. He served with the Royal Army Medical Corps during the First World War.
