= River Roe =

River in Northern Ireland

Coordinates: 55°04′N 7°00′W

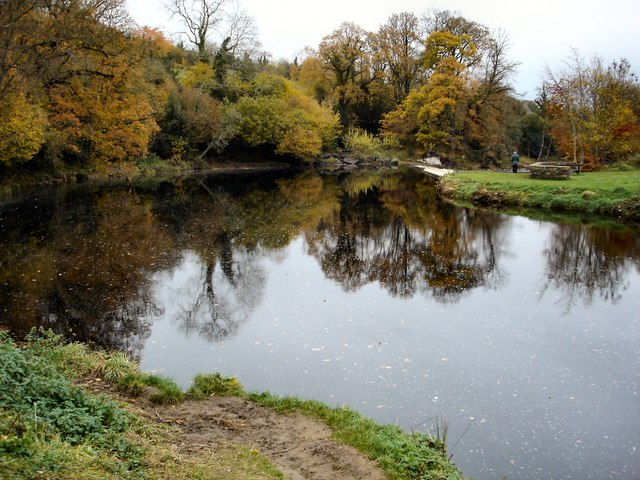
The river flowing through Roe Valley Country Park

The River Roe (Irish: Abhainn na Ró) is a river located in County Londonderry, Northern Ireland. It flows north from Glenshane in the Sperrin Mountains to Lough Foyle, via the settlements of Dungiven, Burnfoot, Limavady and Myroe. The River Roe's length is 34.25 miles (55.12 km).

== Origin ==
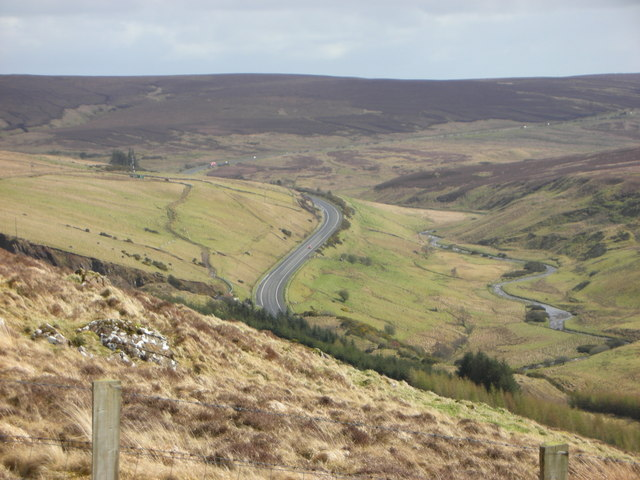
View of the Glenshane Pass, with the Roe on the right

The origin of the name Roe is unclear. Suggestions include a Viking origin in the 8th/9th century, and the Irish rua, meaning "red", i.e. the Red River. This may be a reference to the high amounts of iron found in some places along the river.

The Irish government's placenames database, held by Dublin City University, identifies the Irish version of the name as Abhainn na Ró. This roughly translates into English as "the river of rowing", possibly due to common passage by oar-powered boat craft in earlier times.

== Geology ==
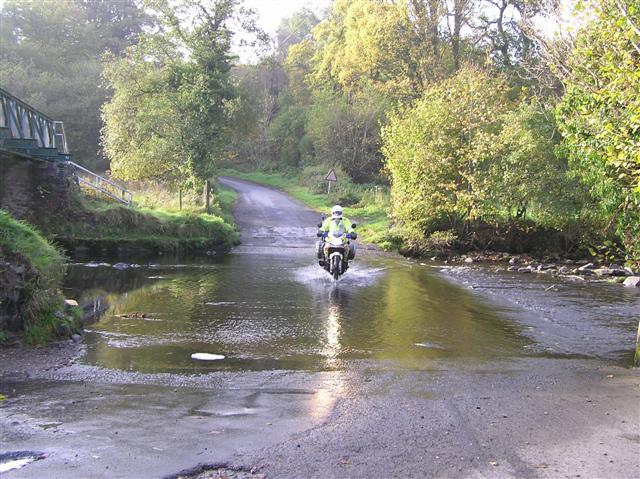
Ford over the Roe, near Dungiven

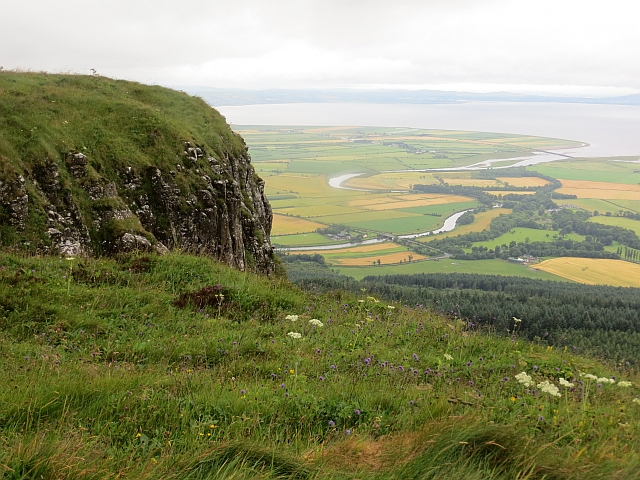
The mouth of the Roe, seen from Binevenagh

The Roe Basin (or Roe Valley) is a wide, glacial valley. The river flows most of the way to Limavady through an open, grassy, pastoral farmland landscape before narrowing through a metamorphic rock gorge within the Roe Valley Country Park. Beyond Limavady the river widens and meanders to an estuary feeding into Lough Foyle at Myroe Levels. Due to the wide, open nature of the upper reaches of the Roe, heavy rainfall can result in large surges of water or floods. Many lower lying fields have earth defences to prevent flooding when the river rises above its natural banks. The estuary is a feeding ground of many birds and nesting area for lapwing.

The main tributaries of the Upper River Roe are the Owenrigh River (which begins in Banagher) and the Owenbeg River (begins near Feeny). They merge outside Dungiven. The main tributary of the Lower River Roe is the Curly River which joins after Limavady.

== Angling ==
The Roe Valley Country Park is a popular area for fishing, with stock of salmon, sea trout and brown trout.

== See also ==
- Rivers of Ireland
