= David Kinnear (journalist) =

David Kinnear (1805 or 1807–November 20, 1862, Montreal) was senior editor of the Montreal Herald and Daily Commercial Gazette. He was a native of Edinburgh, the son of a banker, and a lineal descendant of the celebrated Col. Gardiner. He was admitted to the Scottish bar, but was engaged in mercantile business in London, where he had connections in the highest branches of commerce. He came to America in 1835, and employed some time in various travels throughout the United States and Canada. In 1837 he was among the first to take up arms for the preservation of the province to the British Crown during the rebellion. Soon after, he became connected with the Montreal Gazette which position he relinquished to become a partner in the Montreal Herald of which paper he was chief proprietor at the time of his death. David Kinnear died of dysentery in Montreal on 20 Nov. 1862, leaving behind his wife Mary and a large family.
