= Andrew Kinnear =

Canadian politician

Andrew Kinnear (c. 1750 – May 23, 1818) was an Irish-born political figure in New Brunswick. He represented Westmorland in the Legislative Assembly of New Brunswick from 1786 to 1792.

He was born in Newton Limavady near Derry and came to New Brunswick in 1783 as a United Empire Loyalist, settling in Sackville. His second wife was his cousin Letitia Boyd. Kinnear served as commissary at Fort Cumberland for 30 years.

His son William Boyd also served in the assembly.
