= North West Regional College =

Irish college

Coordinates: 55.0030°N 7.3239°W

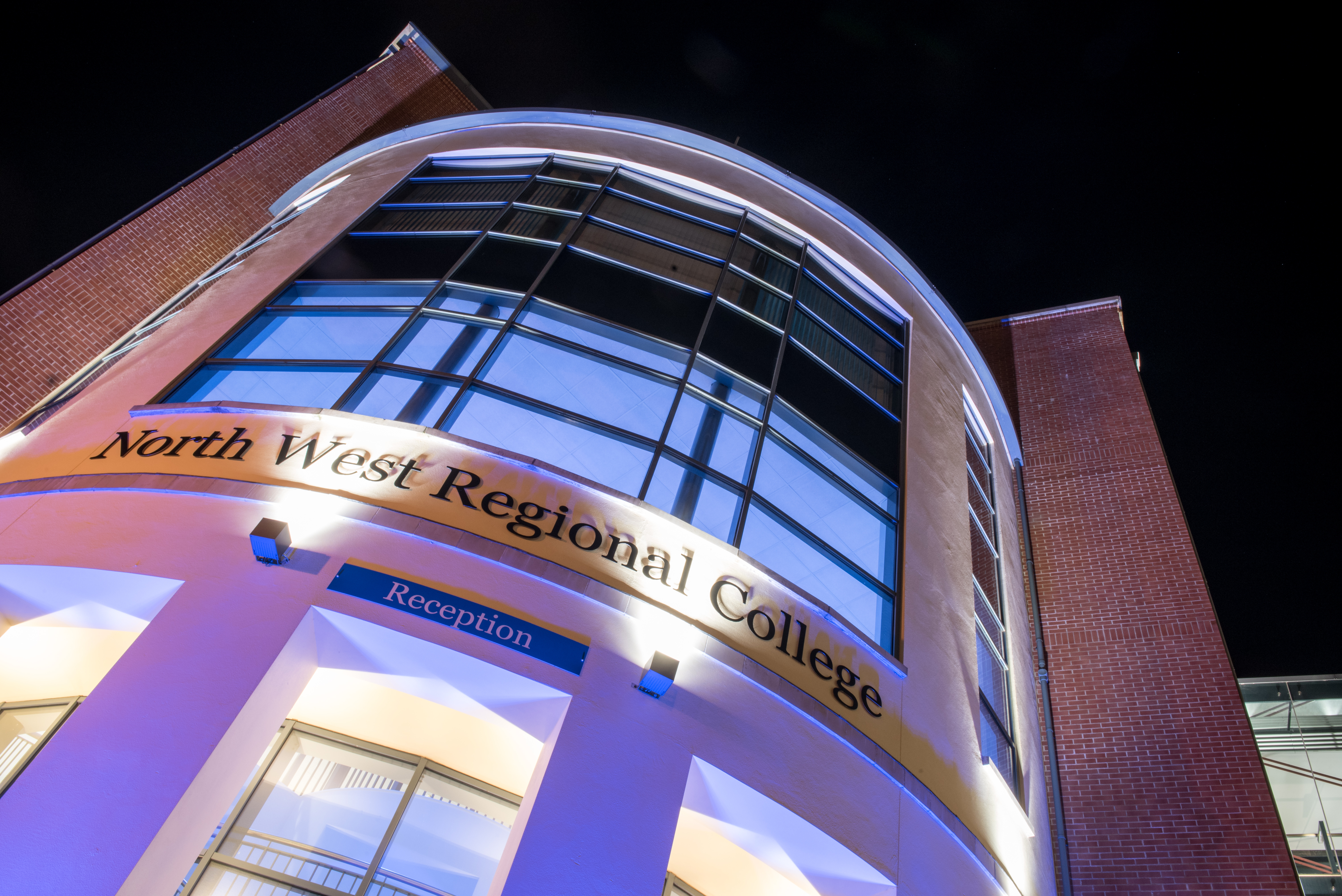
- North West Regional College, Strand Road, Derry
- Established: 2007
- Principal: Leo Murphy
- Location: Derry, Limavady, and Strabane, Northern Ireland
- Website: www.nwrc.ac.uk

North West Regional College is a further education and higher education college in the north-west region of Northern Ireland. The college has five main campuses in counties Londonderry and Tyrone: Strand Road (Derry), Springtown (Derry), Main Street (Limavady), Greystone (Limavady) and Derry Road (Strabane).

Following a review of further education in Northern Ireland Department for Employment and Learning, North West Regional College was established on 1 August 2007, merging the former North West Institute of Further and Higher Education and Limavady College of Further and Higher Education.

Over the last 100 years, the college and its preceding organisations have provided educational courses both to school leavers and adults principally from Derry City, County Londonderry, County Tyrone and County Donegal.

Each year approximately 10,000 full-time and part-time students attend the college to undertake a range of vocational and academic courses.

The current principal of the college is Leo Murphy.
