= A. E. Kinnear =

Australian public servant (born 1868)

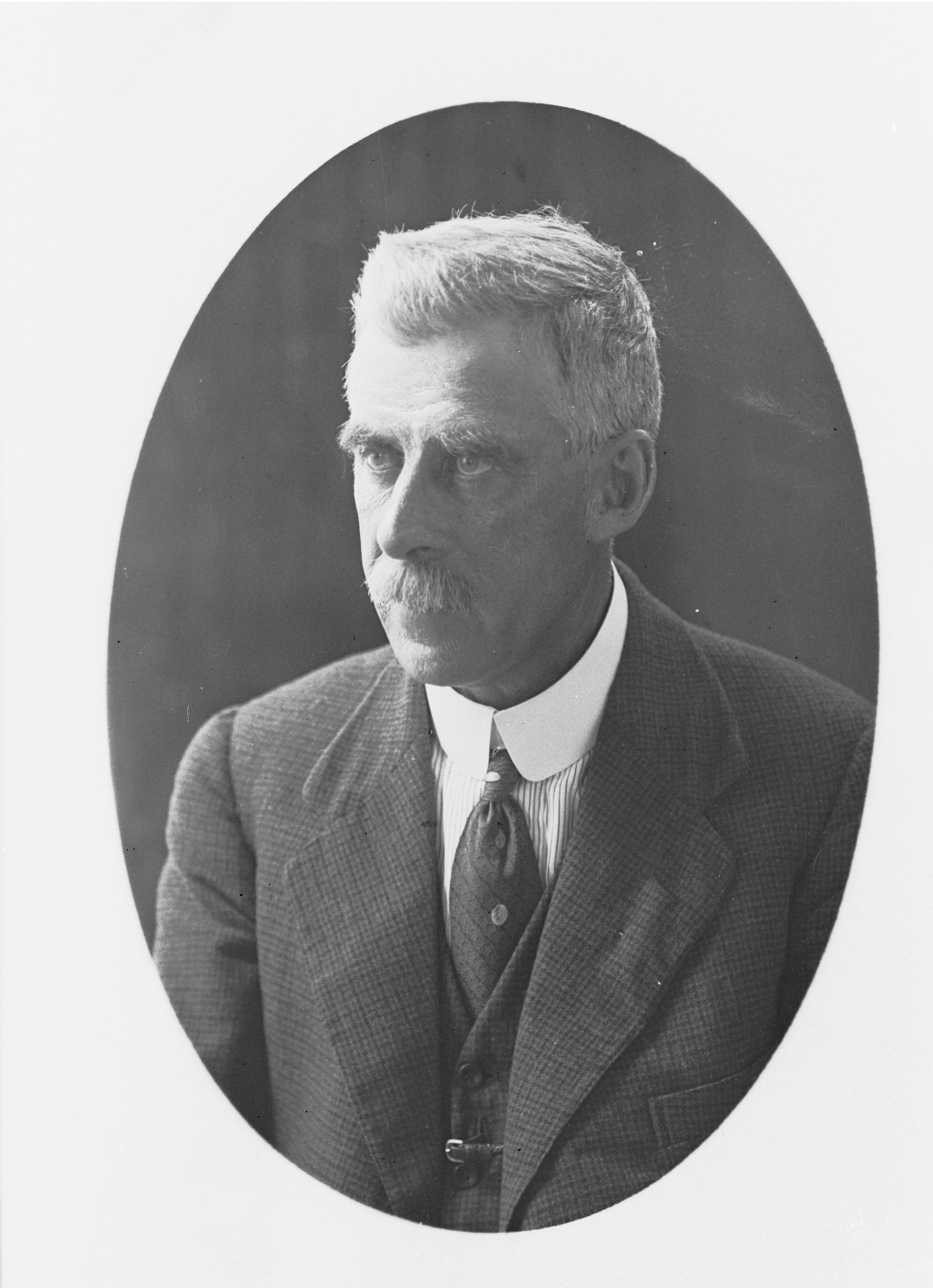
A. E. Kinnear - Secretary to the Public Service Commissioner, c. 1905

Albert Edward Kinnear (born 8 July 1868) was Secretary to the Public Service Commissioner in South Australia.

== Career ==
Kinnear entered the Crown Lands Department as junior clerk on 11 December 1882, made rapid progress in various departments. He was appointed secretary of the Public Service Classification Board in 1901 and acted in that capacity until the completion of the work of the board. He was appointed accountant in the Surveyor-General's Department in 1902, and the position of accountant to the Advances to Settlers' Board was added in 1909. For the next two years he was organising secretary of the egg production and marketing scheme for the Produce Department. In 1911 he returned to the Survey Department as accountant.

In 1917, Kinnear became secretary to the first Public Service Commissioner, and a few months later also became secretary of the Public Service Reclassification Board. He acted as Deputy Public Service Commissioner on many occasions.
