= The Honourable The Irish Society =

Consortium of livery companies

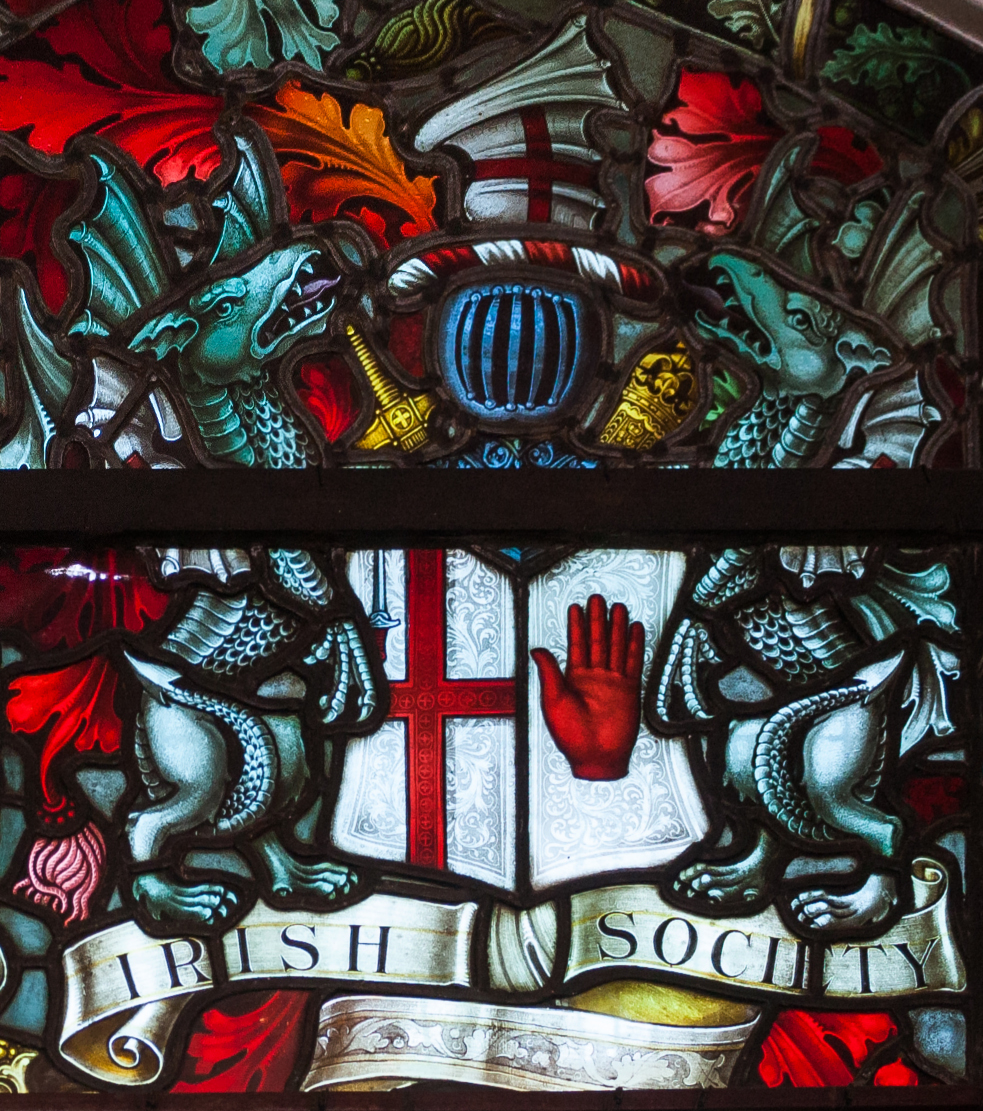
Arms of the Irish Society on a window in Coleraine Town Hall

The Honourable The Irish Society (Note: In full, the "Society of the Governor and Assistants, London, of the New Plantation in Ulster, within the Realm of Ireland".) is a consortium of livery companies of the City of London established during the Plantation of Ulster to colonise County Londonderry. It was created in 1609 within the City of London Corporation, and incorporated in 1613 by royal charter of James I. In its first decades the society rebuilt the city of Derry and town of Coleraine, and for centuries it owned property and fishing rights near both towns. Some of the society's profits were used to develop the economy and infrastructure of the area, while some was returned to the London investors, and some used for charitable work.

The society remains in existence as a "relatively small grant-giving charitable body", registered with the Charity Commission for England and Wales for "the promotion of any exclusively charitable purposes for the benefit of the community of the County of Londonderry and neighbouring areas". In 2020 it had six employees and disbursed £580,000 in grants. Much of its funding derives from its remaining property, including the walls of Derry, a tourist attraction and heritage site, and fisheries on the River Bann.

The society is based in the City of London, with a "Representative" resident in Coleraine. Its legal constitution is as a Court of "honest and discreet citizens of London" chaired by a Governor. The Governor is traditionally a former Lord Mayor of London, and the City's Court of Common Council elects the Court of the Irish Society, whose size was reduced in 2013 from "six and twenty" to 15.

== History ==
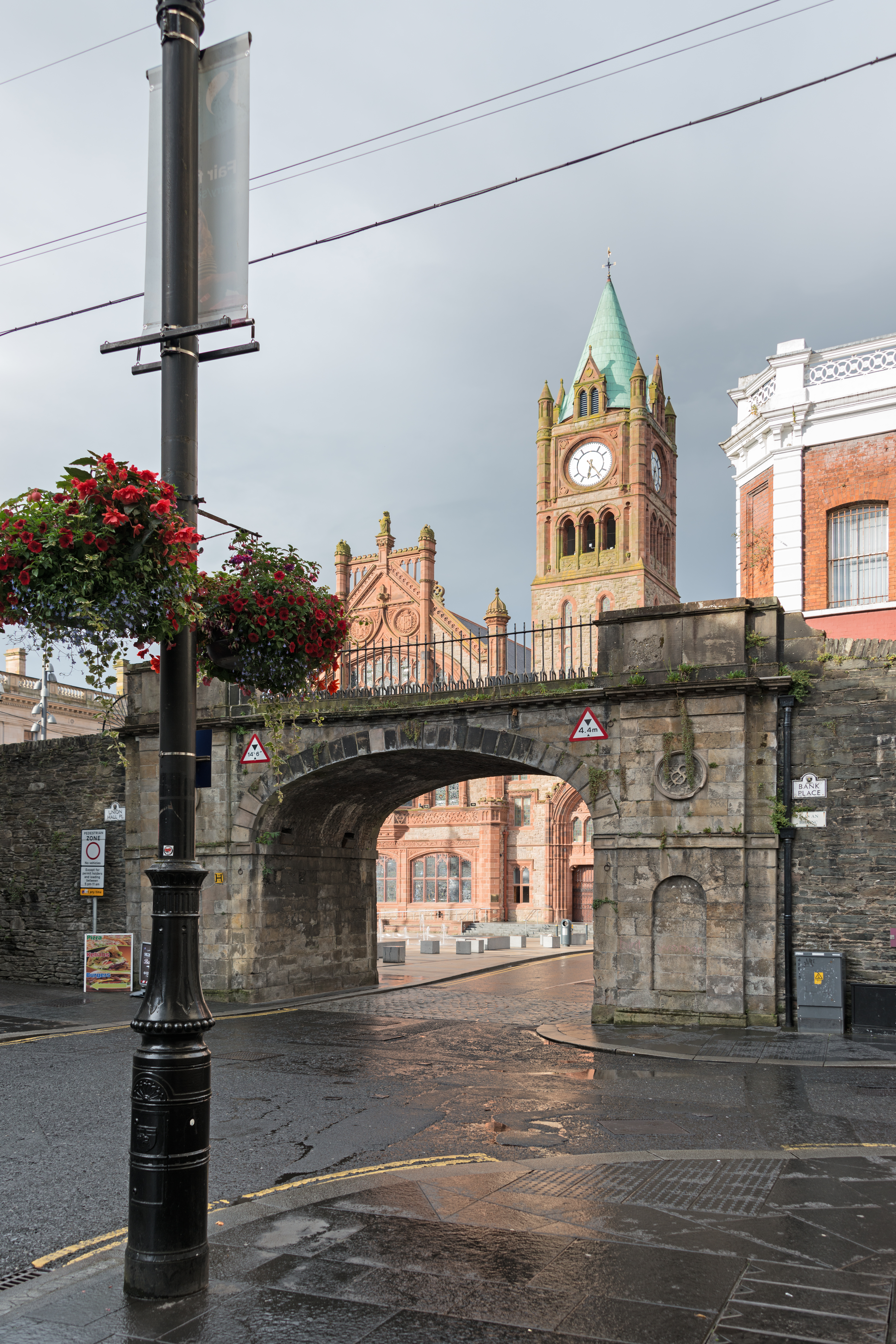
A section of Derry's Walls, together with the Guildhall. Both were constructed by the Irish Society

The Nine Years' War between Gaelic Irish chiefs and the Dublin Castle administration of the Kingdom of Ireland ended in Gaelic defeat 1603, and the Flight of the Earls in 1607 left northwest Ulster open to colonisation. In planning the plantation of Ulster, King James I set out to defend against a future attack from within or without. In his survey, he found that the town of Derry could become either a great asset of control over the River Foyle and Lough Swilly, or it could become an inviting back door if the people of the area were against him. He pressured the guilds of the City of London to fund the resettlement of the area, including the building of a new walled city, and the result was the creation of the society. The Virginia Company of London had been created similarly in 1606 to colonise North America.

The city of Derry was renamed Londonderry in recognition of the London origin of the Irish Society. County Coleraine was enlarged and renamed County Londonderry after its new county town. The rural area of the county was subdivided between the Great Twelve livery companies, while the towns and environs of Londonderry and Coleraine were retained by the Irish Society. The society was sequestrated in 1630, fined for non-performance in 1635, and suppressed in 1637; it was revived by Oliver Cromwell in 1650 and again after the Restoration by Londonderry's 1662 royal charter. A dispute with the Bishop of Derry over fishing rights was appealed from the Irish House of Lords to the English House of Lords, in a controversial move later sanctioned by the Declaratory Act 1719 (6 Geo. 1. c. 5). A private act of the Parliament of Ireland was also passed in 1704 to resolve the dispute.

During the 17th and 18th centuries four of the twelve livery companies sold their estates, the Irish Society requiring in each case a bond of indemnity. The leases to middlemen granted by the other companies expired at various times during the nineteenth century, after which the companies "enormously increased the rental". Until the Municipal Corporations (Ireland) Act 1840 (3 & 4 Vict. c. 108), the society had an influence on the municipal corporations of Derry and Coleraine, with right of appointment of some officials and right of veto over some classes of decision. The society also had some disputes with the corporations over ownership and development of the property. Profits from the society's commercial endeavours were redistributed to the livery companies until a lawsuit brought by the Skinners' Company in 1832 claiming a greater share of this revenue. The case was decided by the House of Lords in 1845, ruling that the society held its property in trust, not for the livery companies, but for "public purposes". Since then, its profits have been used entirely for charitable ends. The 1854 Royal Commission on the City of London recommended that the Irish Society be abolished and its property transferred to a new charitable trust, unconnected to the London Corporation, with trustees nominated by the Lord Chancellor of Ireland.

While the companies' rural estates were sold to tenants under the Irish Land Acts after 1870, the Irish Society's urban property was exempt from the acts. An 1889 House of Commons select committee report stated:

From the evidence of these witnesses it appeared that there was no complaint as to the manner in which the Irish Society had performed its duties; and, with regard to the different City Companies, it was admitted that till recently they had acted with liberality. They had built churches and schools throughout their respective districts and had subscribed with great liberality to the local charities. The complaint was that this liberality on the part of some of the Companies has greatly diminished, that some subscriptions have been entirely withdrawn, and others considerably diminished and that some of the Livery Companies who had formerly given subscriptions to various local charities had sold their lands recently without making provision for the continuance of these subscriptions.

The Irish Society financed the building of Derry's Guildhall; work started in 1887 and it was opened in July 1890, having cost £19,000. In 1923 the society sold most of its remaining property in Derry city to the Government of Northern Ireland for £500,000. By the 21st century its property portfolio was "much reduced".

== Bibliography ==
- A concise view of the origin, constitution and proceedings of the Honourable Society of the governor and assistants of London of the New Plantation in Ulster, within the realm of Ireland, commonly called the Irish Society. London: Printed by A. Taylor for the Court of the City of London. 1832.
- Commissioners appointed to inquire into the municipal corporations in Ireland (1836). Appendix: Part III: Conclusion of the North-Western Circuit. Command papers. Vol. XXIV.
  - pp. 1017–1052 Town of Coleraine
  - pp. 1111–1177 City of Londonderry
- Sharp, W. H. (1843). Retrospect of the Affairs of the ... Irish Society of London, of the New Plantation in Ulster ... from 1824 to 1842 inclusive. London: J. H. Wilson.
- Clarke, C.; Finnelly, W. (1847). "Skinners' Company v The Irish Society". Reports of Cases Heard and Decided in the House of Lords on Appeals and Writs of Error. Vol. XII. Edmund Spettigue. pp. 425–490.
- Commissioners Appointed to Inquire into the Existing State of the Corporation of the City of London (1854). Report, together with the minutes of evidence and appendix. Command papers. Vol. [1772] HC (1854) xxvi. Eyre and Spottiswoode for HMSO.
- Reed, Charles, ed. (1865). An Historical Narrative of the origin and Constitution of the Society ... commonly called The Honourable the Irish Society; together with memoranda of principal occurrences. London: The Honourable the Irish Society.
- City of London Livery Companies Commission (1884). "Appendix: The Ulster estates". Report. Vol. 1. London: Eyre and Spottiswoode. pp. 235–246.
- Select Committee on Irish Society and City Companies (Irish Estates) (30 July 1889). Report, proceedings, minutes of evidence and appendix. Sessional papers. Vol. 11. London: Eyre & Spottiswood.
- Select Committee on Irish Society and London Companies (Irish Estates) (24 July 1890). Report, with the proceedings of the Committee, minutes of evidence, and appendix. Sessional papers. Vol. 14. London: Eyre & Spottiswood.
- Select Committee on Irish Society and London Companies (Irish Estates) (4 May 1891). Report together with the proceedings of the Committee, and appendix. Sessional papers. Vol. 12. London: HMSO.
- Irish Society (1899). A brief historical narrative of the origin and constitution of "The society of the governor and assistants, London, of the new plantation in Ulster, within the realm of Ireland" : commonly called the Honourable the Irish Society; together with memoranda of principal occurrences from 1611 to 1898. London.
