= Thomas Phillips (Irish adventurer) =

Sir Thomas Phillips (1560–1633) was an English knight and soldier of fortune. He was knighted in 1607. Originally granted land at Coleraine, Ulster, Kingdom of Ireland, he forfeited it to the London Livery Companies in exchange for grants of land at Limavady and what became the Moyola estate as part of the Plantation of Ulster. In 1622 he sold the Moyola estate to Thomas Dawson. A son, Sir Dudley Phillips, was a key figure in the defence of Coleraine and Londonderry during the 1641 Rebellion.
