= Traditions of Derry City F.C. =

Football club cultural aspect

This article documents numerous traditions of Derry City Football Club, including the culture associated with and surrounding the club, and its supporters.

== The club's name ==
When the club was first founded in 1928, it named itself Derry City Football Club, as opposed to using the official name of the city - Londonderry. Nationalists generally refer to the city as 'Derry', while unionists call it 'Londonderry'. At the time of the club's naming, however, the dispute would not have been as politicised as it is in the current day and those who founded the club specifically decided against using the name of the city's previous primary club, Derry Celtic F.C., with the aim of offering a more inclusive support-base to football fans in the city. Including "Celtic" in the club's name might have been perceived as being a strong statement of Irish nationalist identity and could have alienated Protestants in the city.

== Colours and jerseys ==
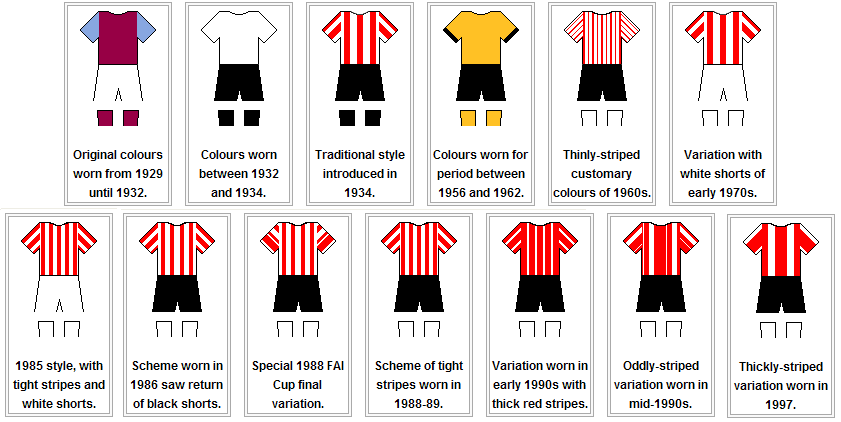
A selection of past home-kit variations.

Derry City wore claret and blue jerseys with white shorts for their first season of football - 1929–30. These were the identical colours to those of Aston Villa, who were a globally renowned footballing power at the time. This scheme lasted until 1932, when the club's first change of colours saw the club directors decide that white jerseys with black shorts should be worn by the team for the 1932–33 season. The style, like that which had come before it, lasted just two seasons and was replaced by the now-traditional red and white "candystripes" with black shorts upon the club's changing of its official colours to that of the modern day for the beginning of the 1934–35 season.

The current colours of the red and white striped jersey with black shorts are derived from an early connection with Sheffield United, who wear the identical pattern. Specifically, the colour-change should be attributed to Billy Gillespie. Gillespie, a native of nearby County Donegal, played for Sheffield United over a twenty-year period from 1913 until 1932, and scored over 137 league and cup goals in 492 games for the South Yorkshire side, as well as captaining them to FA Cup success in 1925. He was the club's most capped player with 25 for Ireland and had started out with Derry Celtic before embarking on a career across the Irish Sea. The man was held in such high regard in his home country that when he left United in 1932 to replace Joe McCleery as manager of Derry City, the club changed their strip to red and white stripes within two years of his arrival in reverence to him and his time at the Blades.

Derry have remained in the red and white stripes since, except for the seasons between 1956 and 1962, when the club's players donned an amber and black kit. Derry had been performing poorly and it was felt that a change of colour might help rejuvenate the team. At the time, the colours were strongly associated with Wolverhampton Wanderers, who were a power-house of English football during the 1950s. However, the colours brought Derry no such luck and were unpopular with the fans who sought a return of the by-then traditional red and white stripes. The seasons were a lean time for the club, with an Irish Cup final defeat to Glenavon FC in 1957 being the highlight.

A re-introduction of the "candystripes" for the 1962–63 season saw the fortunes of the club improve as Derry entered their most successful spell in the Irish League. The colours have been retained ever since. Jerseys over the years, although in keeping with the red and white tradition, have varied slightly in the sense that certain seasons saw Derry wear thinner stripes while others saw thicker or stripes with varying thicknesses being worn by the players on the field.Derry now wear white socks when sporting their full home rig, while they originally wore black ones. Similarly, the club adopted white shorts instead of black ones for a spell in the early 1970s and later in 1985 for their initial season in the League of Ireland. The club's away tops have varied in colour from plain white, to navy and green stripes, to white and light-blue stripes, and to black.

Derry have had their kits supplied by various manufacturers over the years, including Adidas, Avec, Erreà, Fila, Le Coq Sportif, Matchwinner, Umbro, Spall and currently, O'Neills. Commercial sponsorship logos to appear on the front of shirt have included Northlands (a local alcohol and drugs treatment and awareness organisation), Warwick Wallpapers, Fruit of the Loom, Smithwick's, and AssetCo. Other sponsorship logos to have appeared on the sleeve have included the Trinity Hotel, Tigi Bed Head and Tigi Catwalk. For the 2007 season, the logos of local media, Q102.9 and the Derry News, appear on the back of the shirt just below the neck, along with the logo of Meteor Electrical on the jersey's front.

== Crests ==
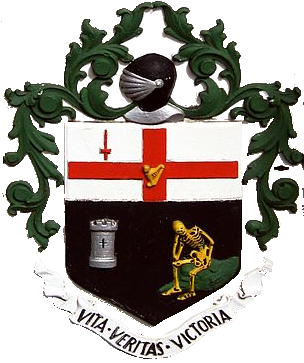
The city's coat of arms, used by the club as a crest prior to the introduction of a unique club crest in 1986, seen in a decoration on the Craigavon Bridge.

Derry City's first exclusive crest, introduced in 1986 and replaced in 1997.

Although the club did not traditionally sport a crest on the club jersey as the concept had not yet become popularised (probably due to the complications and vast time-consumption involved in mass-producing intricate designs before greater technological advancement occurred), throughout the years playing in the Irish League - and for most of the first season in the League of Ireland - Derry City used the coat of arms of the city, rather than having an exclusive crest of their own. This crest often appeared on club memorabilia such as scarves, hats and badges. The symbols on Derry's arms were, and still are, a skeleton, a three-towered castle, a red Saint George's Cross and sword. The sword and cross were devices of the City of London and, along with an Irish harp embedded within the cross, demonstrated the link between the two cities (The city's official name under UK law is, of course, Londonderry), in particular, the association with the Honourable the Irish Society which had been granted lands in and around the city in the past. The castle was thought to relate to a 13th or 14th century keep belonging to the local native chieftains. There were many theories about the skeleton; the most popular being that it is that of a Norman de Burca knight who was starved to death in the castle dungeons in 1332. This was accompanied by the Latin motto, "Vita, veritas, victoria", meaning "Life, truth, victory."

In April 1986, just under a year after the senior rebirth of the club and its entry into the League of Ireland, the DCFC ran a competition in local schools to design a new club crest. The winning entry was by John Devlin, a fourth-year student at St Columb's College, and made its début on 5 May 1986 when Derry City entertained Nottingham Forest at Brandywell Stadium for a friendly match. The crest depicted a simplified version of the city's Foyle Bridge, which had opened 18 months previously, the traditional red and white candy-stripes associated with the shirt of the club bordered by thin black lines and the year in which Derry City was established as a club, as well as a football in the centre representing the fact that the club is a footballing entity. The club's name featured in Impact font. This crest lasted until July 1997, when the current crest was unveiled at Lansdowne Road when Derry City played Celtic in a pre-season tournament. The modernised crest, once again, featured a centred football, the club's name and the year of founding. The famous red a white candy-stripes were present along with a red mass of colour filling the left half of the crest, separated from the right by a white stripe. Known cultural landmarks or items associated with the city are absent from the badge. The origins of this crest are not fully known and the reason for the change in 1997 has never been explained by the club, although it is likely that the club simply wished to develop a fresher, more contemporary image with a minimalist design and also because the Foyle Bridge was no longer as novel, trendy or innovative a feature as it were in the mid-to-late 1980s.

== Rivalries ==
A friendly rivalry is currently maintained with County Donegal club Finn Harps. While both have encountered times of financial trouble in recent years, they have often been helped by the other in this regard. Their success cannot be said to have occurred without this. Finn Harps were one of the major proponents of Derry's joining of the League of Ireland in 1985. Phil Coulter is known as a fan of both sides, and has been instrumental in keeping them as operational football clubs. With Derry now consistently staying in the top-tier and Finn Harps having a hard time maintaining top-flight status, their much-anticipated Northwest derby is now a rarer affair than it once was. Derry also share a northwest derby game with Sligo Rovers, although Sligo is not in as close proximity to Derry as Ballybofey is.

The mid-eighties saw Derry's biggest rivalry coming in the form of Dublin's St. Patrick's Athletic - a side which contained former Republic of Ireland international and Middlesbrough defender, Curtis Fleming, TV3 pundit Paul Osam and ex Derry manager, Pat Fenlon. In recent years, Dublin's Shelbourne FC were seen as top-of-the-table rivals with games between the two often being crucial to the ultimate winning of the league. In turn, these games were often very exciting six-pointers.

There is another club in Derry known as Institute FC, but because the clubs play under different associations no intense footballing rivalry exists, although Institute generally take their support from the city's Protestant or unionist community, as opposed to Derry City, who generally take theirs from the Catholic or nationalist one.

During Derry's time in the Irish League, south Belfast's successful Linfield FC were commonly viewed as the team to beat. Derry also enjoyed an intense rivalry with fellow North West club Coleraine FC. A number of Protestants from Derry follow Coleraine. In 1995 Coleraine and Derry played a two-legged, cross-association Irish News Cup semi-final. Coleraine won the first leg at the Brandywell 2-0 before a scoreless draw in the second leg at Coleraine. Coleraine brought a huge support to the Brandywell but Derry fans chose to boycott the return leg at the Showgrounds for one reason or another.

== Match-day programme ==
Cityview is the name of the club's official match programme. Since 1985, League of Ireland match-day experiences at Brandywell stadium have been augmented by the programme. Every league, FAI Cup, League Cup, and European fixture over the past 22 years has been catered for from the day the late Paddy Doherty put pen to paper in the summer of 1985 right up to the articles which are currently being created for the 2007 season.

Cityview provides loyal Derry City fans and supporters of opposition clubs visiting the Brandywell with information on current affairs within the world of Irish football; League of Ireland, Irish League, Setanta Cup, European, and world football news; player profiles, statistics and interviews; team news and information on player injuries and suspensions; fan views and opinion pieces from long-serving contributors; a fan focus; a regular message from the manager; a half-time quiz; a layout of Brandywell stadium and safety directives; Derry City's history and honours; under-21 and under-18 sections; and an editorial on the game and opposition.

Cityview has gone from strength-to-strength in recent years. On various occasions in Derry City's successful 2006 campaign, Cityview sold more than 1,000 copies in an hour prior to the game. It is estimated that Derry City's programme committee met the demand for in the region of 20,000 copies last season, and seek to better that over the course of the 2007 season. Fully supported by local, national, and international corporate entities, Cityview provides prospective sponsors with the ability to not only align themselves with the success of Derry City, but to actually make a valuable contribution to that success. The benefit to each advertiser is that in excess of 15,000 copies are sold sporting their advertisement or sponsorship. Cityview is open to submissions from supporters of the club in general and aims to air the views of everyone who elects to contribute to the content of the programme. The price of the programme for the 2007 season is £2 at games, all of which goes directly towards the future development of the club and its finances, as well as ensuring that League of Ireland football remains at the forefront of sporting life in the city.

As of the 2007 season, a single issue or an entire season's copies are available to purchase online from anywhere in the world after the programme committee decided that Derry City supporters around the globe should have the opportunity to purchase the club's official match-day programme. Cityview arrives in the hands of football fans hot off the press at the Brandywell, and fans of the Candystripes from around the world who order their subscription have their copy of Cityview dispatched to them on the day of the game.

== Supporters ==
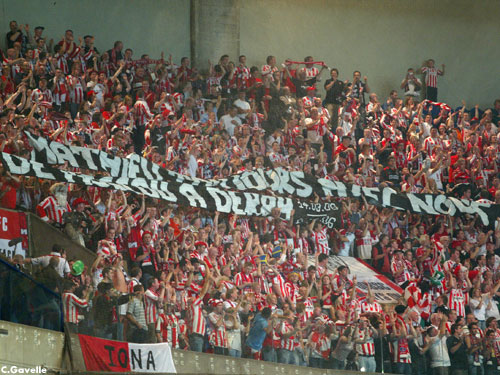
Derry City's fans in the Parc des Princes, Paris on 28 September 2006.

By Irish footballing standards, Derry City have a relatively large and deeply loyal fan-base. Upon the club's entry into the League of Ireland in 1985, crowds of 10,000 regularly flocked to the Brandywell to see their team. The "red and white army", as they are known in reference to the club's red and white colours, are regarded as being one of the largest, noisiest and most colourful groups following a team in the League of Ireland. Derry's average home attendance of 3,127 was the highest of any league team for the 2006 season and they are known to bring substantial numbers to away games, despite their isolation in the north-west. Furthermore, the highest attendance in the Premier Division was the last-night-of-the-season meeting between Derry City and Cork City FC at the Brandywell on Friday 17 November when 6,080 watched Derry exact some measure of revenge for their defeat in the reverse of the fixture the season before (which incidentally was also the highest attendance in 2005). Derry's supporters gave their team remarkable support in the club's UEFA Cup run during the 2006 season – around 3,000 travelled to Motherwell to see Derry beat Gretna FC 5–1 in Fir Park, while over 2,000 made their way to Paris to see their team play PSG in the Parc des Princes. Fans often use the high vantage point of the City Cemetery in Creggan to view games for which they have failed to source tickets or simply to view the games at a distance for free.

The club is renowned for its warm, close-knit, community spirit and the supporters have played a pivotal role in the survival and successes of the club over the years. When massive debts brought Derry close to extinction in the 2000–01 season, the local community responded en masse and saved the club. During the club's successful 2006 season, club legend, Peter Hutton said:

Nobody owns Derry City FC, apart from the people of Derry. Five or six years ago the club was on its knees, on the verge of going out of business. There was no sugar-daddy, no millionaire, no Roman Abramovich to save the club. It was the people and the city who saved the club. People, fans, ordinary people; they went out and banged on doors to collect money, they went around pubs with collection buckets, they did what they could to keep the club alive. Derry is a close-knit place, a small community, they care about their club and that's why we still have a club. And every bit of success we may get this season is down to them.

Support for the club crosses numerous social boundaries. Many fans reside in working class areas, such as the nearby Brandywell, Creggan and Bogside, while others are derived from more affluent regions of the city, like Culmore. While the Cityside is commonly seen as the traditional base of the club, and especially the Brandywell area, the Waterside area of the city, with its sizable Protestant population, boasts a significant support base. Despite the perception of Derry City being a nationalist-supported club, it does have numerous supporters who would be of a Protestant upbringing. With the city viewed as a focal point of culture and activity serving the north-west region of Ireland, Derry's support stretches beyond the urban border of the city and into the surrounding county. Limavady contains a significant support base, as does Strabane in nearby County Tyrone and even areas of bordering County Donegal.

Derry City Chat is a supporters' discussion forum website run by fans of the club. The club itself has from time-to-time made announcements on this forum.

=== Supporters' clubs ===
There are a number of supporter groups following Derry City, including:

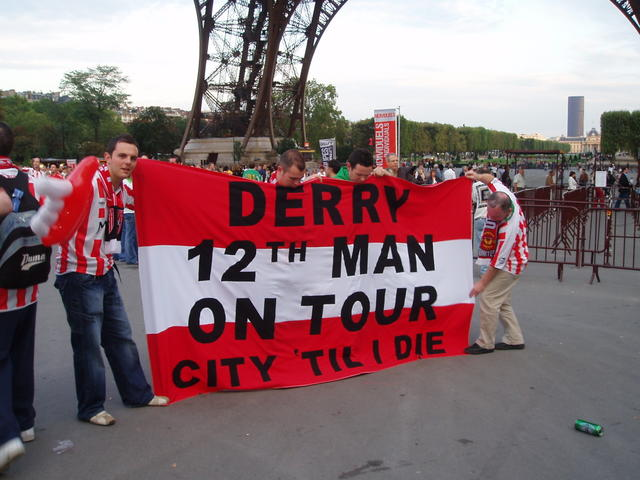
Derry City's twelfth man on tour.

- Brandywell Pride:
- Brandywell Pride:

Brandywell Pride was founded in 1997 by a group of supporters who had been travelling to Derry City's away games for a number of years. Presently, the club has around 30 core-members, who travel week-in and week-out to support Derry City, five of whom form the club's organising committee. The committee members are Gerry Houston (Chairman), Brian Martin (Vice-Chairman), Fergal Tuffy (Treasurer), Adrian McGowan and Gary Barnfield.

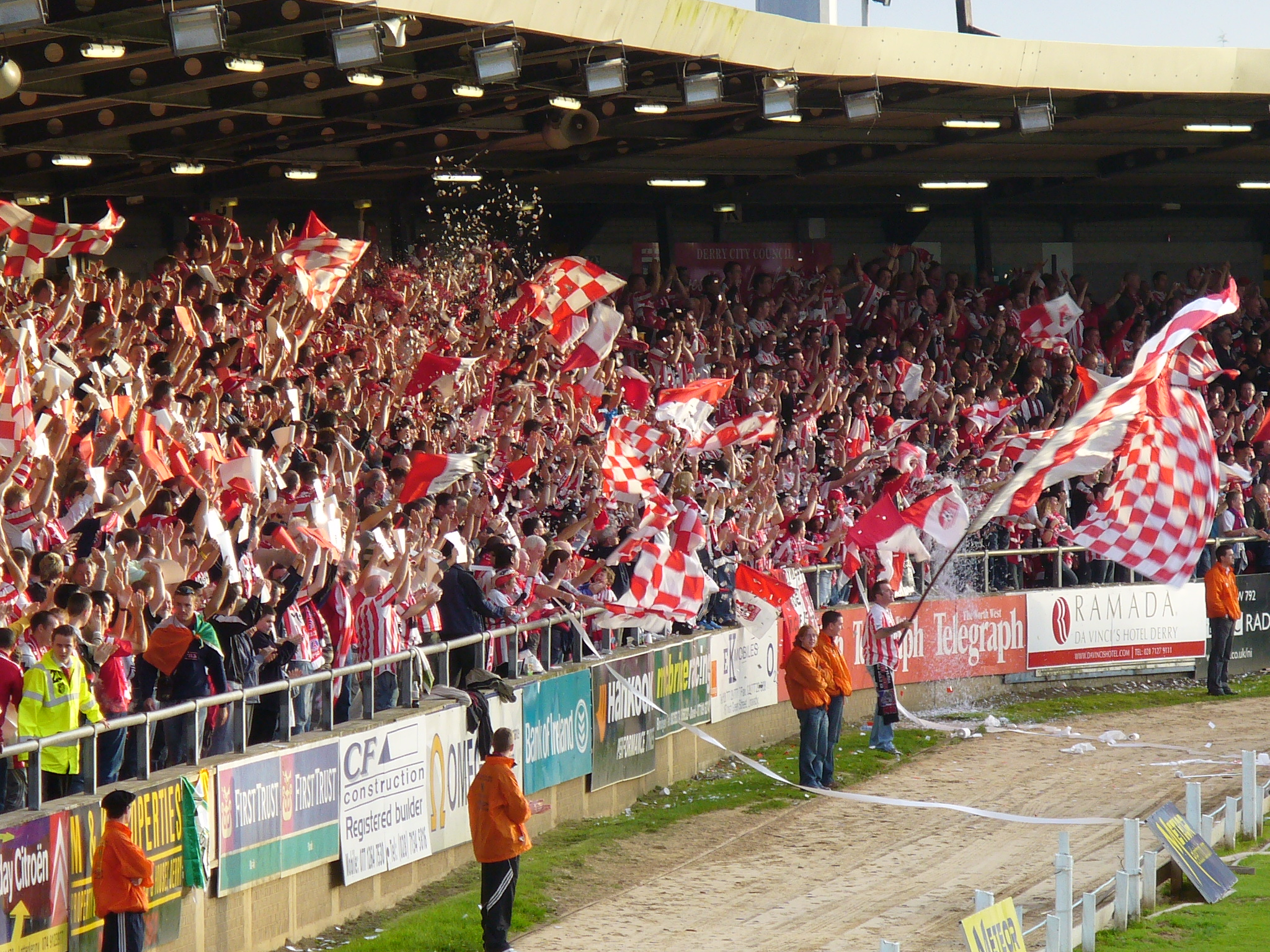
Derry City's fans in the Brandywell on the day of a game.

The group aims to assist Derry City and club officials in any way possible, from dealing with ticket allocations to providing player sponsorship. It has been in a position to buy shares in the club itself, as well contributing to several fund-raising drives by selling tickets. The Brandywell Pride Supporters Club has several main goals. They aim to: support Derry City in attempting to be the biggest club in Ireland, through fundraising and generating support on the terraces, both home and away; to provide Derry supporters with an opportunity to attend as many games as possible; to utilise drums, instruments, flags and other equipment to create as noisy and colourful an atmosphere as is possible; to attract younger members of the community to attend the Brandywell in support of their local team and experience the ups and downs of live football often denied to them due to a developed Irish tradition of supporting English or Scottish teams; and to assist Derry City in whatever way possible, including working with various other supporters clubs and voluntary organisations ensuring that the club reaches its potential. Primarily the club is about colour and noise that contribute to the friendly and enjoyable atmosphere in the Brandywell and various away grounds on match-days.

The supporters club has gone from strength to strength since its founding and has received considerable media attention, featuring on both the BBC and UTV. On 24 August 2006, Kevin "Scaldy" Cairns of the club, who beats a bass drum during games, received a reception from the Mayor of Derry, Helen Quigley, at the city's Guildhall for his dedication and commitment in supporting Derry City. Tommy "Harmonica" Gallagher is also a stalwart and has been an ever-present member since the club's initiation playing songs and melodies all over Ireland, with his trademark tune being his own version of the old Irish favourite Whiskey in the Jar.

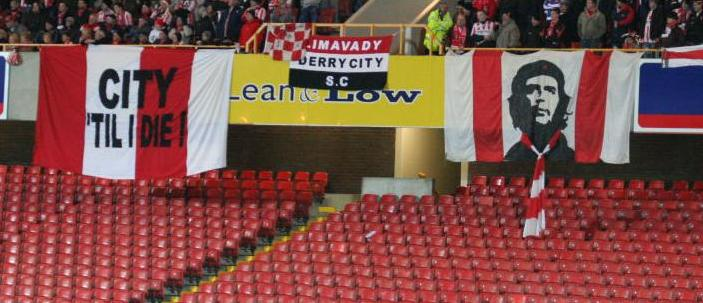
Fans of Derry City display flags during the 2007 Setanta Sports Cup.

The club holds monthly meetings in the Oak Grove Bar in Bishop Street, Derry. Here, the club has its own club room, fully furnished with various items of club memorabilia. The Oak Grove is a popular haunt for pre and post-match refreshments, where every kick is previewed and replayed. Brandywell Pride also holds an annual prize giving night for the Derry City players at the close of each season within the establishment.

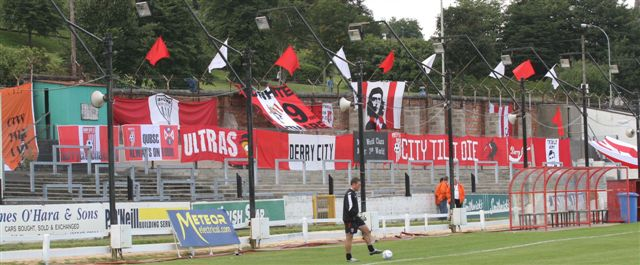
A selection of supporter flags hanging in the Brandywell. A flag depicting the Argentinian-born Cuban revolutionary, Che Guevara, whose image became popular after Stephen Kenny initiated what fans described as a 'candystriped revolution', can be seen alongside a flag with the term 'Ultras' emblazoned across it. Also featured, is a flag in protest of the poor facilities in which the club is forced to play. As the club's ground is currently owned by the Derry City Council, the club itself has no say over development of the stadium. It does, however, have intentions to purchase the land and renovate but the process has been continually delayed. The flag contains the slogan: "Derry City: World Class, Brandywell: Third World.".

- City Exiles Supporters Club:

Formed following a discussion in Derry City's chatroom during a match in May 2006, the club has members in Austria, Canada, England, the Isle of Man, Italy, Scotland, the United States and beyond. The total membership numbers 23 and includes an honorary member, David Tennant. They presented their first 'Player of the Year' award to Ciarán Martyn in 2006.

- Dublin Supporters Club:

The Dublin Supporters Club was officially set up in 2006, but it had been unofficially running for many years prior to that. The aim of the club is to allow Derry City fans based in Dublin to meet up and arrange travels to home and away games, as well as to help organise meeting in the city before the numerous games that the club plays in Dublin each year. During the 2006 season the club had 25 members.

- Post Office Supporters Club
- The Pride of Northside Supporters Club:

The Pride of Northside Supporters Club was founded in 1994 by a group of Derry City supporters and has since grown to establish itself amongst the community as a highly respectable organisation. The club is diverse with, currently, 20 core-members. The club has members across the community, both men and woman, and they consider themselves non-sectarian, non-sexist and non-racist. The main aim is to assist in the promotion and support of Derry City Football Club in the community and football generally. Furthermore, the club provides an opportunity to travel to home and away fixtures. However, the Pride of Northside group is not just about football; throughout the year other private functions are organised, such as outings to the theatre or fishing trips. Also, in the first week of June, the group arranges a week's holiday with usually 15 members attending. The club enjoys a good time overall, both home and away. The official website is filled with general information, including details regarding membership, coach details, post-match analysis and plans for meetings in addition to many photos.

- Queen's University Belfast Supporters Club:

The club had run in the 1980s and 90s but was reformed in 2003 to try to help City fans based in Belfast to attend games at home and away. The club is based at the Queen's University and takes advantage of the funds and facilities on offer to clubs and societies there, even though a large number of members are non-students, be they graduates of Queen's, or indeed just Derry folk based in Belfast and the surrounding area. The club tries to cater for all City fans based east of the Bann and makes pick-ups at various points on their way to and from games.

- The Tr3ble Army:

The Treble Army supporters club was set up by a group of Derry City supporters in December 2005. The club currently has 24 official members. The name was suggested by a club member and is a reference to Derry's historic treble-winning team of 1989. The club chairperson is Sean Grant, the vice-chairperson is Conor Duddy, the club secretary is Finnuala McCartney and Nicola Moran is the club's treasurer.

- United Supporters Club:

The Derry City United Supporters Club was founded in 2007 and is made up entirely of non-nationals residing in the city of Derry. The club has 25 members from all over the world including Africa, South America and Europe and countries such as Iran, Nicaragua, Côte d'Ivoire, El Salvador, Honduras and Belize. The formation of the supporters club was facilitated by Eddie Kerr, the director of the non-national support organisation, SEEDS.

=== Notable supporters ===
Notable fans of Derry City and famous public faces seen supporting the club have included:

- Gerry Anderson - BBC Northern Ireland radio and television broadcaster
- Denis Bradley - Former vice-chairman of the police board for the Police Service of Northern Ireland (PSNI)
- Michael Bradley - Bassist of The Undertones
- Phil Coulter - Songwriter, performer and music producer
- Edward Daly - Former Catholic bishop of Derry
- Billy Doherty - Drummer of The Undertones
- John Duddy - Professional boxer
- Mark Durkan - SDLP politician and leader
- John Hume - Former SDLP politician, leader and Nobel Peace Prize laureate
- Raymond McCartney - Sinn Féin MLA
- Colum Eastwood - SDLP Leader & MLA for Foyle
- Eamonn McCann - Leftist orator, journalist, author and political activist
- Martin McGuinness - Sinn Féin politician
- Paul McLoone - Lead-singer of The Undertones
- Eugene McMenamin - SDLP politician
- Damian O'Neill - Lead-guitarist of The Undertones
- Damian McGinty - Singer & Actor
- John Patrick O'Neill - Former Northern Ireland international footballer
- John O'Neill - Rhythm guitarist of The Undertones
- Martin O'Neill - Football manager and former Northern Ireland international footballer
- Feargal Sharkey - Former lead-singer of The Undertones
- David Tennant - Actor
- James McClean - Footballer

=== Songs and chants of support ===
Derry fans have formed many variations of existing popular songs in order to adapt and create songs and chants of their own. A proportion of these express the fans' undying loyalty for the team, which they swear will remain as strong as ever through thick and thin. Examples include:

Flying high,
Up in the sky,
We'll keep the red flag flying high,
Derry City 'til we die,
We'll keep the red flag flying high.

— To the tune of O Tannenbaum. Fans often raise their scarves and hold them above their heads in tandem with the singing of this song, creating a visual effect.

We are City supporters,
Faithful through and through,
Over and over,
We will follow you.

— To the tune of Over and Over.

The fans also regularly sing verses of Teenage Kicks by the Derry band, The Undertones, viewing it as somewhat of a city anthem. Chants heard from the stands include the timed repetition of the phrase "red and white army" and the continental-like shout of "D-C-F-C, allez, allez, allez". The latter is a chant derived from the supporters' 2006 UEFA Cup experience in Paris and is often accompanied by a performance of the "Grecque", which is popular amongst fans of PSG and had been enacted by them on the night. It was also imitated by Derry fans for the first time during the game along with the opposition fans.

== In popular culture ==
Derry City have made numerous appearances in popular and general culture. In the world of music, the club was given exposure by Derry punk band, The Undertones, who had the cover of their 1980 hit single, My Perfect Cousin, feature a Subbuteo figure sporting the colours of Derry City. The song's video saw the group's front-man, Feargal Sharkey, kick and leap to head a ball while wearing the red and white jersey. Similarly, on the cover of their second ever single, Get Over You, the words "Derry City F.C." can be seen.

The club has also featured on popular television. Because they are a club based in Northern Ireland playing in the league of the Republic of Ireland they often receive the attention of broadcasters in both jurisdictions. A bizarre own-goal, in which the opposition goal-keeper was lobbed from outside the box by a player from his own team, scored by Finn Harps' Terry Leake for Derry City during a 1989–90 season Brandywell-meeting once appeared on the "What happened next?" round of the BBC's A Question of Sport. Furthermore, in the BBC documentary series Who Do You Think You Are? shown the night before Derry's clash with Paris St. Germain in the 2006–07 UEFA Cup's First Round, it was highlighted that Archie McLeod, the grandfather of David Tennant, the tenth Doctor Who, was a Derry City player. Derry had supplied a lucrative signing-on fee and had enticed him over from the highlands of Scotland. Likewise, features about the club were run by Football Focus prior to and after the same UEFA Cup game. Irish television has also featured the club. Derry City played in the first League of Ireland match ever to be shown live on television when they visited Tolka Park to play Shelbourne during the 1996–97 season. The game was broadcast on RTÉ's Network 2 and finished 1–1 with Gary Beckett scoring for Derry. In addition, during an 8 January 2007 episode of RTÉ's The Panel, Irish comedian, Karl Spain, was seen drinking from a mug displaying the crest of Derry City. Although Spain himself is not known to be a fan of Derry, one of the shows producers, Seamus Cassidy from Derry, is. During the next show one week later, fellow comedian, Dara Ó Briain, was also seen drinking from the mug. On 22 January 2007 the mug was seen in the hands of a third panellist, Irish television and radio personality, Ray D'Arcy.

Another medium to play host to the club has been the radio. On 20 April 2005, Derry City featured in an audio documentary The Blues and the Candy Stripes on RTÉ Radio 1's Documentary on One. The documentary was produced in the aftermath of the historic friendly game between Derry and Linfield that took place on 22 February 2005 — the first between the two teams to occur since a game on 25 January 1969 during which Linfield's fans had to be evacuated from the Brandywell by police at half-time due to civil unrest and ugly scenes within the ground. The 2005 match was organised as somewhat of a security test in the run-up to the likely possibility that both teams, with socially polar fan-bases, would qualify for and be drawn against one another in a near-future Setanta Cup competition.

Moreover, the club has appeared in a joke perpetrated by local printed press outlet, the Derry Journal, who once reported that Gary Lineker had signed for Derry. However, the date of the publication was 1 April, and the story was an April Fools' prank.

== Other traditions ==
- Teenage Kicks by The Undertones, who hail from Derry, is held as a club anthem by the fans and it receives frequent air-play over the club's PA system in the Brandywell.
- Derry City has an official merchandise unit - The Candystripe Store - at 1A, High Street, Derry as well as its club shop within the grounds of the Brandywell and its online club shops.
- The club occasionally publishes a podcast known as iCandy. The podcast editions contain information and opinions related to Derry City's affairs.
