= Derry City F.C. =

Association football club based in Northern Ireland

Derry City
- Full name: Derry City Football Club
- Nickname: The Candystripes
- Founded: 1928
- Ground: Brandywell Stadium; Derry, Northern Ireland
- Capacity: 6,242
- Owner: Supporter owned
- Chairman: Philip O'Doherty
- Manager: Stephen O'Donnell
- League: League of Ireland Premier Division
- 2026: 5th of 10
- Website: derrycityfc.net
Home colours	Away colours

Derry City Football Club are a professional football club based in Derry, Northern Ireland. They play in the League of Ireland Premier Division, the top tier of league football in the Republic of Ireland, and are its only member from Northern Ireland. The club's home ground is the Brandywell. Derry City wear red and white striped shirts from which their nickname, the Candystripes, derives. The club are also known as the Red and White Army, Derry or City.

The club, founded in 1928, initially played in the Irish League, the domestic league in Northern Ireland, and won a title in 1964–65. In 1971, security concerns related to the Troubles meant matches could not be played at the Brandywell and the team had to play home fixtures 30 miles (48 km) away in Coleraine. While security force objections to the use of the Brandywell were withdrawn the following year, the Irish League insisted that the arrangement, an unsustainable one, continue and the club withdrew from the league. After 13 years in junior football, Derry City joined the League of Ireland's new First Division for 1985–86. They won the First Division title and achieved promotion to the Premier Division in 1987, remaining there until an administrative relegation in 2009. The club won a domestic treble in 1988–89.

After spending the majority of its time in the League of Ireland in the Premier Division, the club was expelled in November 2009 when it was discovered there were unofficial secondary contracts with players. It was reinstated a few weeks later but, as punishment, was demoted to the First Division. The club eventually won its way back to the Premier Division.

== History ==
The staff and squad of Derry City in 1965

Founded in 1928, the club decided against using the controversial official title of the city – Londonderry – in its name, while also deciding against continuing the name of the city's previous main club, Derry Celtic, so as to be more inclusive to all identities and football fans in the city. Derry City was granted entry into the Irish League in 1929 as professionals and was given permission by the Londonderry Corporation to use the municipal Brandywell Stadium. The club's first significant success came in 1935 when it lifted the City Cup. It repeated the feat in 1937, but did not win another major trophy until 1949, when it beat Glentoran to win its first Irish Cup. It won the Irish Cup for a second time in 1954, beating Glentoran again, and for a third time in 1964 – that year also winning the Gold Cup – despite the club's conversion to part-time status after the abolition of the maximum wage in 1961. This led to the club's first entry into European competition, in the 1964–65 UEFA Cup Winners' Cup, in which it was beaten by Steaua Bucharest 5–0 on aggregate. The club won the 1964–65 Irish League and subsequently became the first Irish League team to win a European tie over two legs, beating FK Lyn 8–6 on aggregate in the 1965–66 European Cup. Derry did not complete the next round, as the Irish Football Association (IFA) declared its ground was not up to standard, after a game had been played there during the previous round. Derry suspected sectarian motives, as it played in a mainly nationalist city and so had come to be supported largely by Catholics. The IFA, Belfast-based, was dominated by Protestants and it was widely suspected that it would rather have been represented by a traditionally unionist team. Relations between the club and IFA quickly deteriorated.

There had been no significant history of sectarian difficulties at matches in the first 40 years of the club's history, but in 1969 the Civil Rights campaign disintegrated into communal violence, which were followed by 30 years of the Troubles. Despite the social and political unrest, Derry reached the Irish Cup final in 1971, in which it was beaten 3–0 by Distillery. As the republican locality surrounding the Brandywell saw some of the worst violence, numerous unionist-supported clubs were reluctant to play there. The Royal Ulster Constabulary (RUC) ruled the zone unsafe for fixtures. With no other feasible local ground available, Derry had to travel to the majority unionist town of Coleraine, over 30 miles (48 km) away, to play its "home" games at the Showgrounds. This situation lasted from September 1971 until October 1972 when, faced with dwindling crowds (most Derry fans were unwilling to travel to Coleraine due to the political situation and the longer journey) and dire finances, the club formally requested permission to return to the Brandywell. Despite a new assessment by the security forces concluding that the Brandywell was no longer any more dangerous than any other league ground and a lifting of the security ban, Derry's proposal fell by one vote at the hands of its fellow Irish League teams. Continuing without a ground was seen as unsustainable and on 13 October 1972 Derry withdrew from the league amidst a perception that it was effectively forced out.

The club continued as a junior team during the 13-year-long 'wilderness years', playing in the local Saturday morning league, and sought re-admission to the Irish League. Each time, the club nominated the Brandywell as its chosen home ground but the Irish League refused re-admission. Suspecting refusal was driven by sectarianism, and believing it would never gain re-admission, Derry turned its attentions elsewhere.

The official programme from a home game against Sligo Rovers on 17 November 1985 in Derry City's first League of Ireland season

=== Entry into the League of Ireland ===
Chart of yearly table positions for Derry City in League of Ireland

Derry applied to join the reorganised League of Ireland (the league in the Republic of Ireland) in 1985 with the Brandywell as its home. The move required special dispensation from the IFA and FIFA, but eventually Derry was admitted to the league's new First Division for 1985, joining as semi-professionals. As its stadium was situated in a staunchly republican area once known as "Free Derry", with a history of scepticism towards the RUC in the local community, Derry received special permission from UEFA to steward its own games. The presence of the RUC was regarded as more likely to provoke trouble than help prevent it.

Derry's first match in the new system was a 3–1 League of Ireland Cup win over Home Farm of Dublin at the Brandywell on 8 September 1985. The return of senior football to Derry attracted large crowds. Later in the season, after turning professional, it won the League of Ireland First Division Shield with a 6–1 aggregate victory over Longford Town. The following year – 1987 – Derry won the First Division along with promotion to the Premier Division, remaining there for the subsequent 22 years. The club reached the 1988 FAI Cup final, but lost to Dundalk. The next season – 1988–89 – the club was financially forced to revert to semi-professional status but Jim McLaughlin's side managed to win a treble; the league, the League Cup and the FAI Cup. Qualifying for the 1989–90 European Cup, it met past winners, Benfica, in the first round.

=== Modern highs and lows ===
Since 1989, Derry has won the League of Ireland Premier Division once – in 1996–97 – but has been runner-up on three occasions. It added six more FAI Cups to its tally in 1995, 2002, 2006, 2012, 2022 and 2026, and was runner-up in 1994, 1997, 2008, 2014 and 2024 and has also won ten further League Cups.

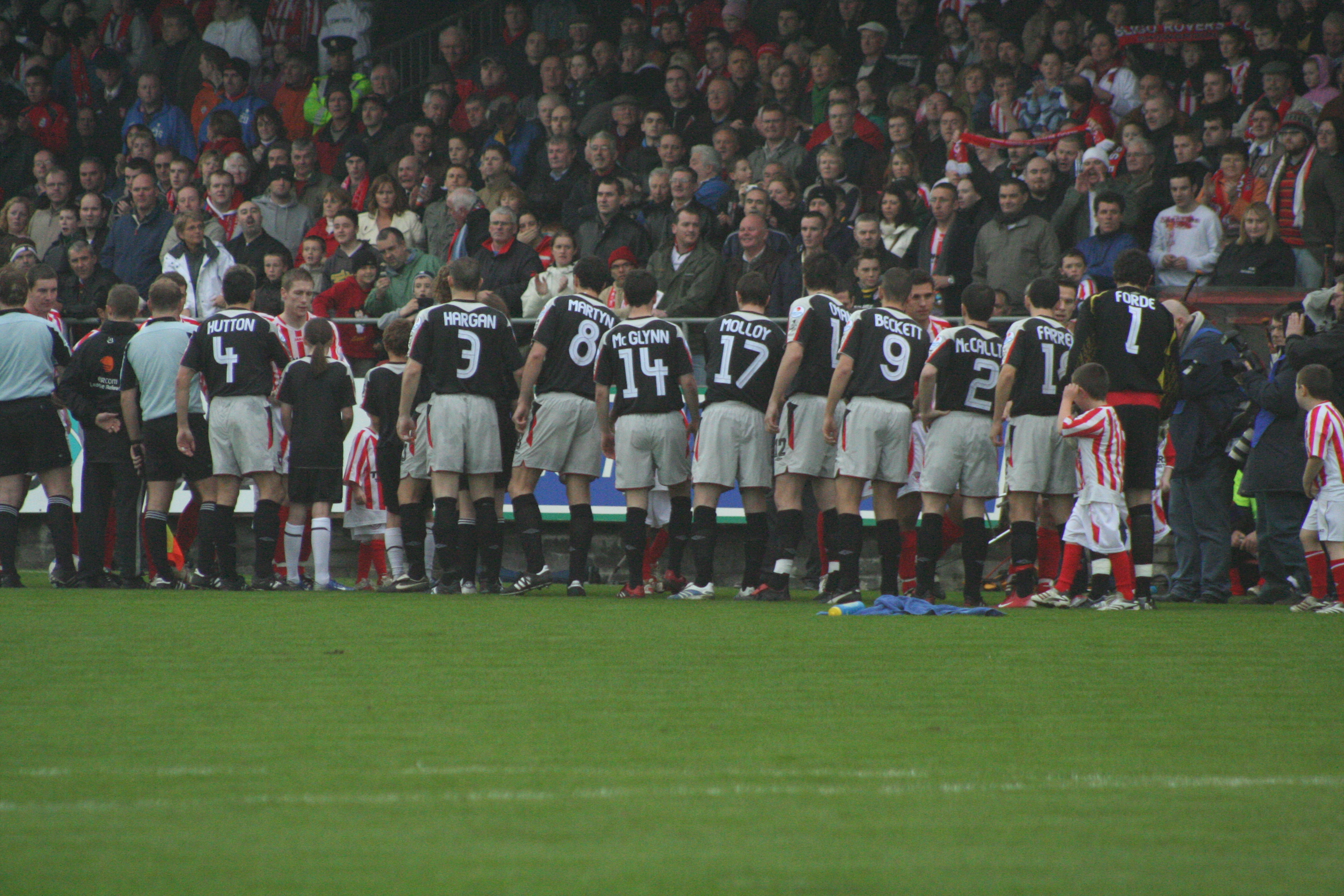
The Derry City team lined up prior to the game with Sligo Rovers in the 2006 FAI Cup semi-final at the Sligo Showgrounds on 29 October

The club has been beset by financial problems and was on the verge of bankruptcy due to an unpaid tax bill in 2000. An extensive fund-raising effort was undertaken by local celebrities and the city's people to save the club from extinction. Derry played high-profile friendlies against clubs such as Celtic, Manchester United, Barcelona and Real Madrid to raise extra money. This helped keep the club in operation, but difficulties remained and Derry nearly lost its Premier Division place in 2003 when it finished ninth and had to contest a two-legged relegation-promotion play-off with local rivals, Finn Harps. Derry won 2–1 on aggregate after extra-time at the Brandywell and remained in the top flight, avoiding further damage.

With finances secured, the club became the first in Ireland to be awarded a premier UEFA licence in 2004. Derry re-introduced professional football and its form improved, as it finished second in 2005. Derry's 2005 League Cup victory also saw the club qualify for the cross-border Setanta Cup for the first time in 2006. It entered the 2006–07 UEFA Cup's preliminary rounds, beating IFK Göteborg and Gretna to reach the first round where it faced Paris Saint-Germain; after a home 0–0 draw it lost 2–0 away. Derry finished second again in 2006, but went on to win the FAI Cup and League Cup double. It qualified for the 2007 Setanta Cup, as well as the preliminary rounds of the 2007–08 UEFA Champions League, and was accepted into the restructured Premier Division for 2007. The club had a disappointing league campaign in 2007, finishing seventh despite being pre-season favourites.

The club, by owing huge debts, was expelled from the League of Ireland by the FAI in November 2009 for breaching the Participation Agreement and dissolved, but a new Derry club using the "Derry City" name joined for 2010 – with the FAI allowing it into the First Division By January 2010 with a new board, the new chairman, Philip O'Doherty was reported to have acquired a new kit deal with Hummel. Additionally, O'Doherty was quoted in the Derry Journal referring to the application to play in the First Division:

...I'm confident that we've provided a quality application and we're hopeful that we will secure the necessary UEFA Licence to compete in the First Division.

On Monday 15 February 2010, the new Derry City was awarded a First Division licence by the Independent Club Licensing Committee, allowing it eligibility to compete in the 2010 First Division. By the end of October 2010 Derry had clinched the First Division title and with it, promotion back to the premier division after winning 1–0 away at Monaghan United in the last game of the season.

== Colours and crests ==
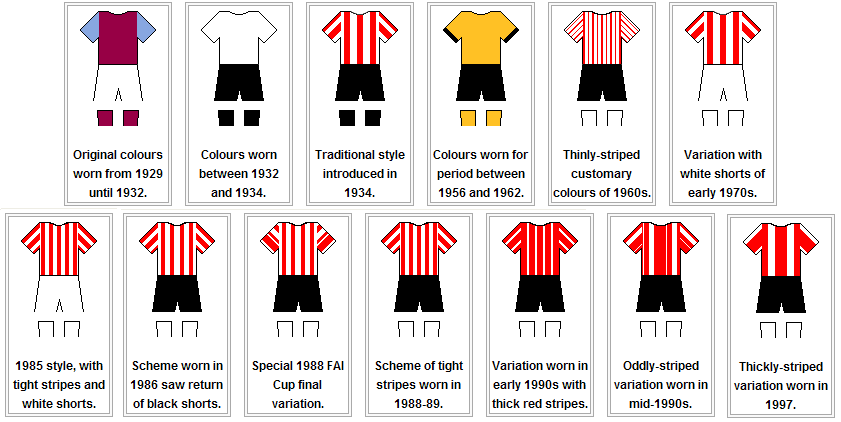
A selection of past home-kit variations

Derry City wore Aston Villa Football Club's famous claret and blue jerseys with white shorts for its first season – 1929–30. The colours lasted until 1932, when white jerseys with black shorts were adopted. This style was replaced by the now-traditional red and white "candystripes" with black shorts in 1934. The style derived from Sheffield United, who wore the pattern and, specifically, Billy Gillespie, a native of nearby County Donegal. He played for Sheffield United from 1913 until 1932, captaining them to a 1925 FA Cup win. The club's most capped player with 25 appearances for Ireland, he was held in such high regard in his home country that when he left Sheffield United in 1932 to become Derry's player-manager, they changed their strip within two years in appreciation of his career at Sheffield United.

Derry have worn red and white stripes since, except from 1956 to 1962, when the club's players wore amber and black. Jerseys since 1962 have had "candystripes" of varying thickness. The kit features white socks – originally black socks were used and occasionally red if a clash with the opposition occurred. Similarly, white shorts were adopted for a spell in the early 1970s and for 1985. They are still sometimes worn if a clash occurs, as are black socks. Away jerseys have varied in colour from white, to navy and green stripes, to yellow, to white and light-blue stripes, and to black.

Derry have had various kit suppliers, including Adidas, Avec, Erreà, Fila, Le Coq Sportif, Matchwinner, Umbro, Spall O'Neills, Hummel, and, currently, O'Neills. Commercial sponsorship logos to appear on the shirt's front have included Northlands, Warwick Wallpapers, Fruit of the Loom, Smithwick's and AssetCo. Logos to have appeared on the sleeve have included the Trinity Hotel, Tigi Bed Head and Tigi Catwalk. For 2007, the logos of local media, Q102.9 and the Derry News, appeared on the back of the shirt just below the neck, along with the logo of Meteor Electrical on the jersey's front.

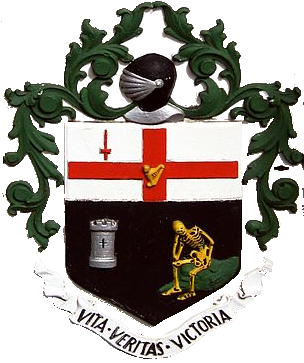
The city's coat of arms, used by the club as a crest prior to the introduction of a unique club crest in 1986, seen in a decoration on the Craigavon Bridge

The club did not sport a crest on the club jersey throughout the Irish League years, nor for most of the first League of Ireland season. Instead, the coat of arms of the city appeared on club memorabilia such as scarves, hats and badges. The symbols on the arms are a skeleton, three-towered castle, red Saint George's Cross and sword. The sword and cross are devices of the City of London, and along with an Irish harp embedded within the cross, demonstrate the link between the two cities – the city's official name under UK law is Londonderry and the city itself was developed by The Honourable The Irish Society, a livery company of the City of London. The castle is thought to be an old local Norman keep built in 1305 by the de Burca clan. The skeleton is believed to be that of a knight of the same clan who was starved to death in the castle dungeons in 1332. This is accompanied by the Latin motto, "Vita, veritas, victoria".

Derry City's first exclusive crest, introduced in 1986 and replaced in 1997 by the crest which lasted to 2009

In April 1986 the club ran a competition in local schools to design a crest for them. The crest depicted a simplified version of the city's Foyle Bridge, which had opened 18 months previously, the traditional red and white stripes of the jersey bordered by thin black lines, the year in which the club was founded and a football in the centre representing the club as a footballing entity.

With the novelty of the Foyle Bridge wearing off over time, the crest lasted until 15 July 1997, when the current one was unveiled at Lansdowne Road with the meeting of Derry City and Celtic during a pre-season friendly tournament. The modern crest also features a centred football, the year of founding and the club's name in a contemporary sans-serif font – Industria Solid. The red and white stripes are present along with a red mass of colour filling the left half of the crest, separated from the right by a white stripe.

== Home ground ==
Derry City's home ground is the municipal Brandywell Stadium, situated just south-west of the Bogside in the Brandywell area of Derry. It is often abbreviated to "the Brandywell" and is also a local greyhound racing venue, with an ovoid track encircling the pitch. The dimensions of the pitch measure 111 by 72 yards (101 m × 66 m). The legal owner is the Derry City Council which lets the ground to the club. Due to health and safety regulations the stadium has a seating capacity of 2,900 for UEFA competitions, although it can accommodate 7,700 on a normal match-day, terraces included. The curved cantilever all-seated "New Stand" was constructed in 1991, while development on the still-insufficient facilities has been delayed numerous times and had yet to take place as of the end of the 2016 season.

Plans of Derry City's to purchase a pitch fell through after its formation due to the tight time-scale between its foundation in 1928 and the season's beginning in 1929 and so the Londonderry Corporation (now the Derry City Council) was approached for the use of the Brandywell which had been used for football up until the end of the 19th century. It agreed and the club still operates under the constraints of The Honourable The Irish Society charter limitations which declare that the Brandywell must be available for the recreation of the community. In effect, the club does not have private ownership and, thus, cannot develop by its own accord, with that discretion or whether to sell being left to the Derry City Council.

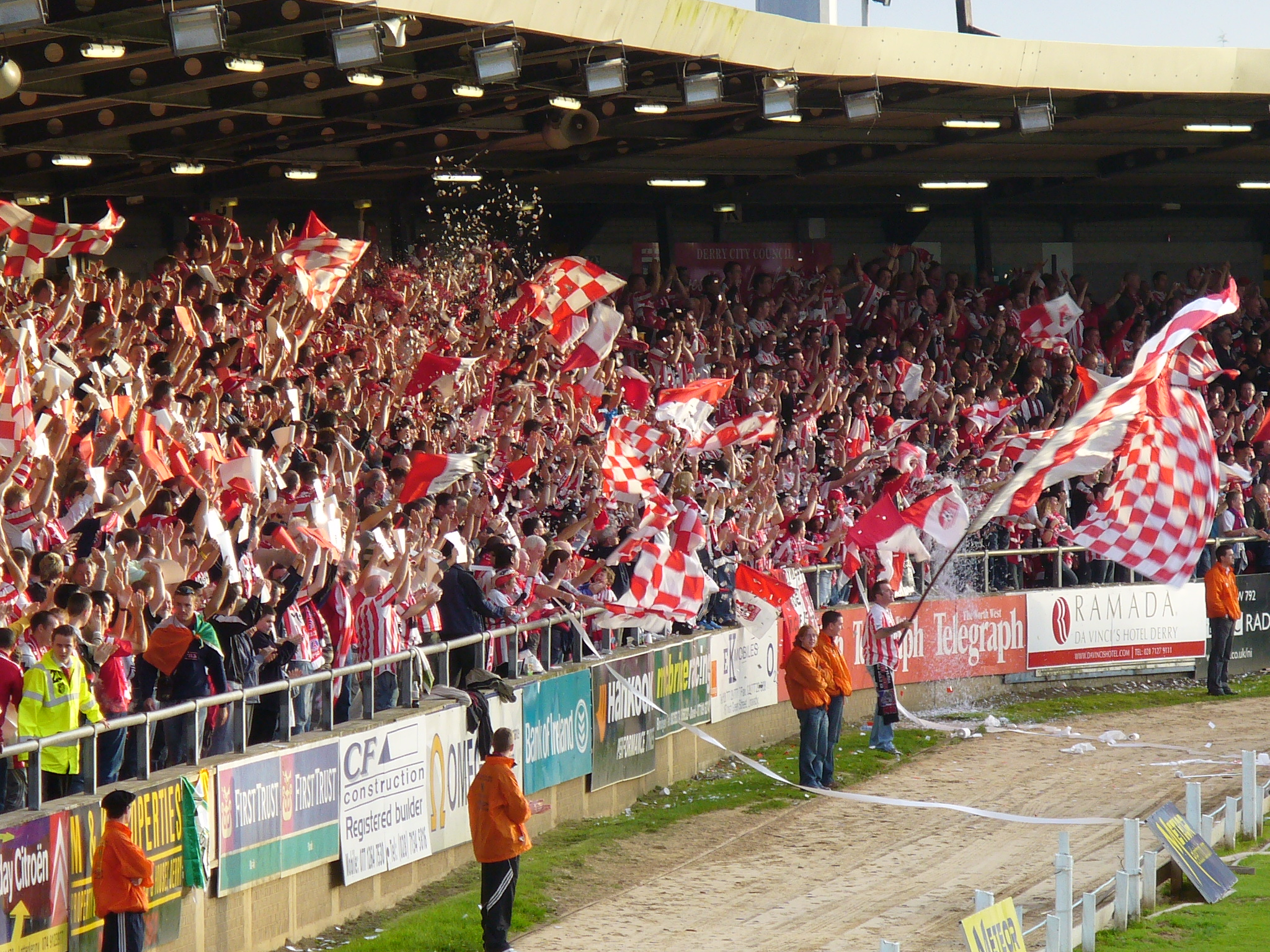
Derry City supporters in the Brandywell

Derry City's first game at the Brandywell was a 2–1 loss to Glentoran on 22 August 1929. In 1933, the purchase of Bond's Field in the Waterside was mentioned, but it was thought to be too far away from the fan-base which had built up on the Cityside, especially in the Brandywell area. It also had first option on Derry Celtic's old ground, Celtic Park, but hesitated on a final decision and the Gaelic Athletic Association bought it ten years later. It also decided against buying Meenan Park for £1,500.

Because of Northern Ireland's volatile political situation during the Troubles and security fears for Protestants and those of the unionist tradition visiting the mainly nationalist city of Derry, the Brandywell has not always been the home ground of Derry City. In 1970 and 1971, Derry had to play its "home" ties against Linfield at Windsor Park in Belfast – the home-ground of Linfield. From September 1971 until October 1972 Derry was forced to play all its "home" games at the Showgrounds in mainly Protestant Coleraine, over 30 miles (48 km) away, as police ruled the republican Brandywell area as too unsafe for visiting unionists, who themselves made up at least half of Derry City's own fanbase at that time. The Brandywell did not see senior football for another 13 years as the Irish Football League upheld a ban on the stadium and Derry decided to leave the league as a result. Only greyhound meetings and junior football were held during this time.

In December 2010 the club introduced a new credit card type season ticket system to ensure abuse of tickets could no longer occur and additionally ensuring more accurate attendance count at matches.

They played all their home matches of the 2017 season at Maginn Park in Buncrana due to renovation works at the Brandywell.

In 2025, Derry City agreed to a new proposed 25-year lease to the stadium that would put the club on the path to outright ownership of Ryan McBride Brandywell Stadium. This new lease will allow for Stormont grant funding via the Northern Ireland Football Fund to be approved and complete the second phase of development on the new stand, named after former player Mark Farren. The lease was approved unanimously by the city council with cross party support.

== Supporters ==
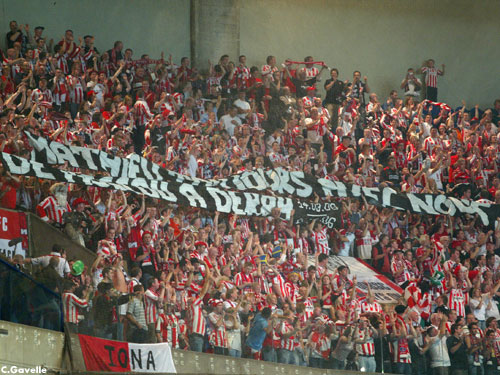
Derry City's fans in the Parc des Princes, Paris on 28 September 2006

By Irish standards, Derry City have a relatively large and loyal fan-base. The club was considered among the strongest and best-supported teams in the Irish League, and upon the club's entry into the League of Ireland in 1985, crowds of nearly 10,000 attended to the Brandywell for the return of matches. More recently, Derry City became the best supported team at an FAI Cup Final ever, when over 20,000 Derry supporters attended the 2022 FAI Cup Final, in which Derry overcame Shelbourne. Derry's average home attendance of 3,127 was the highest of any team for the 2006 season. The highest attendance was the last-night-of-the-season meeting between Derry and Cork City at the Brandywell on Friday 17 November when 6,080 watched Derry win 1–0. Domestically, Derry's supporters travel to away games in "bus-loads". They gave large support in the club's 2006 UEFA Cup run – around 3,000 travelled to Motherwell and "maintained a wall of sound" as Derry beat Gretna 5–1 at Fir Park, and "some 3,000" went to Paris to see Derry play Paris Saint-Germain in the Parc des Princes. During the home legs, ticketless fans desperate to see the games watched from a distance while standing on the high vantage point overlooking the Brandywell offered by the City Cemetery in Creggan and parked hired double-decker buses outside the stadium to help them see over the ground's perimeter.

The club is known for its community spirit, and the supporters have played a pivotal role in the survival and successes of the club. When debts brought Derry close to extinction in the 2000–01 season, the local community responded en masse to help save the club. During the club's successful 2006 season, club captain, Peter Hutton said:

Nobody owns Derry City F.C. apart from the people of Derry. Five or six years ago the club was on its knees, on the verge of going out of business. There was no sugar-daddy, no millionaire, no Roman Abramovich to save the club. It was the people and the city who saved the club. People, fans, ordinary people; they went out and banged on doors to collect money, they went around pubs with collection buckets, they did what they could to keep the club alive. Derry is a close-knit place, a small community, they care about their club and that's why we still have a club. And every bit of success we may get this season is down to them.

Likewise, former Social Democratic and Labour Party leader and Nobel Peace Prize winner John Hume, who was the club's president, stated in 1998 of the club's relationship with the community:

Derry City F.C. has been the linchpin in the life of the community in Derry since its foundation in 1928. Throughout the club's history, the Candystripes have provided a sporting outlet for young people and older supporters alike. The history of the club is intertwined with that of its city. It has seen struggle and marginalisation turn to renewal and success. The pride people have in this club reflects the pride we hold in our city. Derry City players and supporters alike are superb ambassadors for the city. Today, the club, like the city, looks to the future with great hope. For all its successes, Derry City would be nothing without the people of the city.

Support for the club is quite dependent on geography and crosses social boundaries. Fans come from both working class areas, such as the Brandywell area and Bogside, and more affluent regions of the city, like Culmore. The Cityside is seen as the traditional base of the club, especially the Brandywell area, although the Waterside is also home to a smaller number of supporters. The club are supported mainly by Derry's nationalist community. The connection is argued to be rooted mainly in geography, as well as social, cultural and historical circumstances, as opposed to the club or its fans pushing towards the creation of a certain identity. Indeed, prior to 1969, over half of the club's support base came from the sizeable Unionist community that lived in the cityside at the time. The onset of the troubles made the Brandywell's Nationalist location too dangerous to visit and Unionist support fell away to a small minority, in keeping with the rapid Unionist depopulation of the cityside as a whole. The city's wider Protestant community, almost entirely based in the Waterside, is largely apathetic, though some unionists and loyalists see the club as a symbol of Catholicism and nationalism as a result of the sectarian divide in support. Joining the Republic of Ireland's league augmented the perception and, on occasion, Protestant hooligans have thrown missiles at Derry's supporter buses as they journeyed to or returned from games across the border. Minor nationalist elements within the Derry City support-base see football as a means of reinforcing sectarian divides.

With the city being a focal point of culture and activity serving the north-west region of Ireland, support stretches beyond the urban border and into the surrounding county; Limavady, Strabane in nearby County Tyrone and areas of bordering County Donegal contain support.

== European record ==
=== Overview ===
Competition	Pls	W	D	L	GF	GA
European Cup / UEFA Champions League	9	1	1	7	9	26
UEFA Cup / UEFA Europa League	30	7	5	18	37	56
UEFA Europa Conference League / UEFA Conference League	12	4	2	6	9	14
European Cup Winners' Cup / UEFA Cup Winners Cup	6	1	1	4	1	11
TOTAL	57	13	9	35	56	107

=== Matches ===
Season	Competition	Round	Opponent	Home	Away	Aggregate
Representing Northern Ireland
1964–65	European Cup Winners' Cup	1R	(Romania) Steaua București	0–2	0–3	0–5
1965–66	European Cup	PR	(Norway) Lyn Oslo	3–5	5–1	8–6
1965–66	European Cup	1R	(Belgium) Anderlecht	w/o	0–9	0–9
Representing Republic of Ireland
1988–89	European Cup Winners' Cup	1R	(Wales) Cardiff City	0–0	0–4	0–4
1989–90	European Cup	1R	(Portugal) Benfica	1–2	0–4	1–6
1990–91	UEFA Cup	1R	(Netherlands) Vitesse	0–1	0–0	0–1
1992–93	UEFA Cup	1R	(Netherlands) Vitesse	0–3	1–2	1–5
1995–96	UEFA Cup Winners' Cup	1R	(Bulgaria) Lokomotiv Sofia	1–0	0–2	1–2
1997–98	UEFA Champions League	1QR	(Slovenia) Maribor	0–2	0–1	0–3
2003–04	UEFA Cup	QR	(Cyprus) APOEL	0–3	1–2	1–5
2006–07	UEFA Cup	1QR	(Sweden) IFK Göteborg	1–0	1–0	2–0
2006–07	UEFA Cup	2QR	(Scotland) Gretna	2–2	5–1	7–3
2006–07	UEFA Cup	1R	(France) Paris Saint-Germain	0–0	0–2	0–2
2007–08	UEFA Champions League	1QR	(Armenia) Pyunik	0–0	0–2	0–2
2009–10	UEFA Europa League	2QR	(Latvia) Skonto	1–0	1–1	2–1
2009–10	UEFA Europa League	3QR	(Bulgaria) CSKA Sofia	1–1	0–1	1–2
2013–14	UEFA Europa League	2QR	(Turkey) Trabzonspor	0–3	2–4	2–7
2014–15	UEFA Europa League	1QR	(Wales) Aberystwyth Town	4–0	5–0	9–0
2014–15	UEFA Europa League	2QR	(Belarus) Shakhtyor Soligorsk	0–1	1–5	1–6
2017–18	UEFA Europa League	1QR	(Denmark) Midtjylland	1–4	1–6	2–10
2018–19	UEFA Europa League	1QR	(Belarus) Dinamo Minsk	0–2	2–1	2–3
2020–21	UEFA Europa League	1QR	(Lithuania) Riteriai	N/A	2–3 (a.e.t.)	N/A
2022–23	UEFA Europa Conference League	1QR	(Latvia) Riga FC	0–2	0–2	0–4
2023–24	UEFA Europa Conference League	1QR	(Faroe Islands) HB Tórshavn	1–0	0–0	1–0
2023–24	UEFA Europa Conference League	2QR	(Finland) KuPS	2−1	3−3	5−4
2023–24	UEFA Europa Conference League	3QR	(Kazakhstan) Tobol	1−0	0–1	1−1 (5–6 p)
2024–25	UEFA Conference League	1QR	(Gibraltar) Bruno's Magpies	2−1 (a.e.t.)	0–2	2−3
2026–27	UEFA Europa League	1QR	(Bulgaria) CSKA Sofia	1−2	2−3	3−5
2026–27	UEFA Conference League	2QR	(Croatia) Rijeka	0–1	0–1	0−2

- (Full details)

=== UEFA coefficient and ranking ===
Derry City's UEFA coefficient accumulates to a total value of 4.000 as of August 2023.

Current club ranking

- 290 (Cyprus) Aris Limassol
- 291 (Cyprus) AEL Limassol
- 292 (Georgia (country)) Dila Gori
- 293 (Republic of Ireland) Derry City FC
- 294 (Romania) FCV Farul Constanța
- 295 (Lithuania) FK Panevėžys
- 296 (Kazakhstan) FC Ordabasy

https://kassiesa.net/uefa/data/method5/trank2024.html

== Players ==
Current squad
As of 8 November 2026

Note: Flags indicate national team as defined under FIFA eligibility rules; some limited exceptions apply. Players may hold more than one non-FIFA nationality.

No.	Pos.	Nation	Player
1	GK	IRL	Brian Maher
3	DF	NIR	Patrick McClean
4	DF	ENG	Jamie Stott
7	MF	IRL	Michael Duffy
8	MF	IRL	Adam O'Reilly
10	MF	IRL	Darragh Markey
11	MF	NIR	Gavin Whyte
12	MF	IRL	Darragh Burns
13	GK	ENG	Tom Norcott (on loan from Reading)
14	MF	ENG	Ellis Chapman
15	MF	IRL	James Clarke
17	MF	NED	Nick Twisk
19	DF	ENG	Brandon Fleming

No.	Pos.	Nation	Player
20	MF	NIR	Carl Winchester
21	MF	POR	Kévin dos Santos
22	DF	NIR	Conor Barr
23	DF	NIR	Cameron Dummigan
24	DF	ENG	Brooklyn Lyons-Foster
25	DF	IRL	Christy Grogan
27	FW	NIR	Liam Boyce
28	MF	ENG	James Olayinka
29	FW	ENG	Tyler Smith
32	FW	IRL	Terence Doherty
33	MF	IRL	Aaron Heaney
50	GK	NIR	Conal McDermott

=== Out on loan ===
Note: Flags indicate national team as defined under FIFA eligibility rules; some limited exceptions apply. Players may hold more than one non-FIFA nationality.

No.	Pos.	Nation	Player
6	DF	IRL	Rob Slevin (on loan at Coleraine until 30 June 2027)
26	GK	ENG	Shea Callister (on loan at Crusaders until 30 June 2027)

Retired numbers

5 – in honour of Ryan McBride
18 – in honour of Mark Farren

== Non-playing staff ==
Position	Staff
Manager	Mark Connolly (Interim)
Assistant manager	Seamus Lynch
First-team coach	Andy Mitchell
Professional Development coach	Mark McChrystal
Goalkeeping coach	Anthony Fennelly
Strength & Conditioning coach	Danny Doherty

== Managerial history ==
Manager	Start	Finish
Joe McCleery	1929	1932
Billy Gillespie (Note: Acted as player-manager)	1932	1940
Management Team Committee (MTC)	1940	1942
Willie Ross	1942	1953
MTC	1953	1958
Tommy Houston	1958	1959
Matt Doherty	1959	1961
Willie Ross	1961	1968
Jimmy Hill	1968	1971
Doug Wood	1971	1972
Willie Ross	1972	1972
Jim Crossan	1985	1985
Noel King	1985	1987
Jim McLaughlin	1987	1991
Roy Coyle	1991	1993
Tony O'Doherty	1993	1994
Felix Healy	1994	1998
Kevin Mahon	1998	2003
Dermot Keely	2003	2003
Gavin Dykes	2003	2004
Peter Hutton	2004	2004
Stephen Kenny	2004	2006
Pat Fenlon	December 2006	May 2007
Peter Hutton	May 2007	July 2007
John Robertson	2 July 2007	28 December 2007
Stephen Kenny	28 December 2007	24 December 2011
Declan Devine	1 January 2012	27 October 2013
Roddy Collins	19 November 2013	12 May 2014
Peter Hutton	13 May 2014	15 September 2015
Paul Hegarty	16 September 2015	29 October 2015
Kenny Shiels	5 November 2015	27 October 2018
Declan Devine	12 November 2018	22 April 2021
Ruaidhrí Higgins	23 April 2021	15 November 2024
Tiernan Lynch	20 November 2024	5 August 2026

== Honours ==
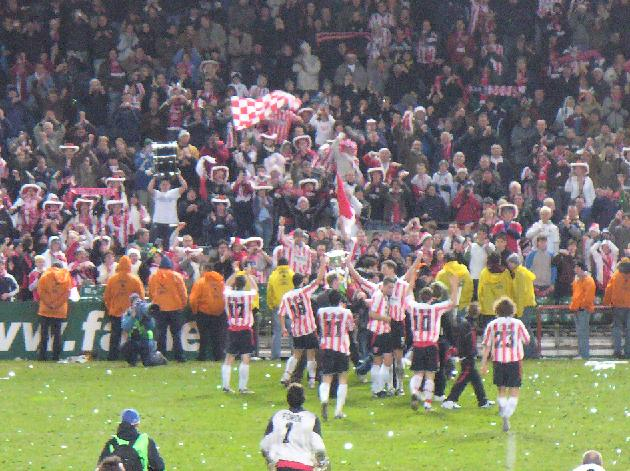
Derry City celebrate winning the 2006 FAI Cup

- Irish Football League: 1
  - 1964–65
- League of Ireland Premier Division: 2
  - 1988–89, 1996–97
- FAI Cup: 7
  - 1988–89, 1994–95, 2002, 2006, 2012, 2022, 2026
- League of Ireland Cup: 11
  - 1988–89, 1990–91, 1991–92, 1993–94, 1999–2000, 2005, 2006, 2007, 2008, 2011, 2018
- President of Ireland's Cup: 2
  - 2023, 2026
- Irish Cup: 3
  - 1948–49, 1953–54, 1963–64
- League of Ireland First Division: 2
  - 1986–87, 2010
- League of Ireland First Division Shield: 1
  - 1985–86
- City Cup: 2
  - 1934–35, 1936–37
- Gold Cup: 1
  - 1963–64
- Top Four Cup: 1
  - 1965–66
- Irish News Cup: 1
  - 1996–97
- A Championship: 1
  - 2011
- North West Senior Cup: 18
  - 1931–32, 1932–33, 1933–34, 1934–35, 1935–36, 1936–37, 1938–39, 1945–46, 1951–52, 1953–54, 1957–58 (shared), 1959–60, 1961–62, 1962–63, 1963–64, 1965–66, 1968–69, 1970–71
- Northern Ireland Intermediate League: 2
  - 1979–80, 1983–84
- Enda McGuill Cup: 2
  - 2007, 2021

== Records ==
Peter Hutton holds the club record for matches played in League of Ireland football with a total of more than 660 appearances for Derry City, a club record. As of 16 July 2007, Paul Curran has made the second highest number of appearances for the club in the League of Ireland with 518, followed by Sean Hargan with 408 since 1995.

The club's all-time highest goal-scorer is Jimmy Kelly with 363 goals between 1930 and 1951. Since the entry of the club into League of Ireland football, Mark Farren is Derry's top scorer with 114 goals after 209 competitive appearances for the club between 2003 and 2012. Derry's first ever scorer was Peter Burke at home to Glentoran on 22 August 1929 as the club lost 2–1. Two days later, Sammy Curran had the honour of scoring Derry's first hat-trick, as the club came back from 5 to 1 down away to Portadown, only to lose 6–5 to a late goal. Barry McCreadie was Derry's first scorer in the League of Ireland as he scored during a 3–1 home win over Home Farm on 8 September 1985. Derry's first hat-trick in the League of Ireland was scored by Kevin Mahon away to Finn Harps on 15 December 1985. Derry's 1000th league goal was scored by Conor Sammon on 9 May 2008 against Shamrock Rovers.

Derry's record League of Ireland defeat was to Longford Town in January 1986 – the score was 5–1. The club's record League of Ireland win was 9–1 against Galway United in October 1986. The club has only suffered relegation in the Irish League due to a breach of regulations, in 2009. Derry are the only League of Ireland team to have completed a treble, in the 1988–89 season. Derry's 5–1 away win against Gretna at Fir Park, Motherwell in the 2006–07 UEFA Cup second qualifying round is the largest away winning margin for any League of Ireland team in European competition. Derry played a record number of 54 games in the whole 2006 season, including all competitions. Previously, the record had been the 49 games played in all competitions during the treble-winning 1988–89 season.

The Brandywell's record attendance in the League of Ireland system is 9,800 people who attended an FAI Cup second round tie between Derry and Finn Harps on 23 February 1986. In the Irish League, a crowd of 12,000 attended the 1929–30 season home game against Linfield.

A graphical representation of Derry City's historical standings in the Irish League and League of Ireland

== In popular culture ==
The single cover for "My Perfect Cousin" by The Undertones features a Derry City figurine

Derry City have made numerous appearances in popular culture. In the world of music, the club was given exposure by Derry punk band, The Undertones, which had the cover of its 1980 hit single, "My Perfect Cousin", feature a Subbuteo figure sporting the colours of Derry City. The song's video included the group's front-man, Feargal Sharkey, kicking and leaping to head a ball while wearing the red and white jersey. Similarly, on the cover of its second ever single, Get Over You, the words "Derry City F.C." can be seen.

The club have also featured on popular television. Due to the fact that it is a club based in Northern Ireland playing in the league of the Republic of Ireland, it often receives the attention of broadcasters in both jurisdictions. In the BBC documentary series Who Do You Think You Are? shown the night before Derry's clash with Paris St. Germain in the 2006–07 UEFA Cup first round, it was highlighted that Archie McLeod, the grandfather of Doctor Who actor David Tennant, was a Derry City player. Derry had supplied a lucrative signing-on fee and had enticed him over from Scotland. Likewise, features about the club were run by Football Focus prior to and after the same UEFA Cup game. Irish television has also featured the club. Derry City played in the first League of Ireland match ever to be shown live on television when it visited Tolka Park to play Shelbourne during the 1996–97 season. The game was broadcast on RTÉ's Network 2 and finished 1–1 with Gary Beckett scoring for Derry.

Another medium to play host to the club has been the radio. On 20 April 2005, Derry City featured in an audio documentary The Blues and the Candy Stripes on RTÉ Radio 1's Documentary on One. The documentary was produced in the aftermath of the historic friendly game between Derry and Linfield that took place on 22 February 2005 – the first between the two teams to occur since a game on 25 January 1969 during which Linfield's fans had to be evacuated from the Brandywell by police at half-time due to civil unrest and ugly scenes within the ground. The 2005 match was organised as a kind of security test in the run-up to the likely possibility that both teams, with socially polar fan-bases, qualified for and be drawn against one another in a Setanta Cup competition.
