= St. Columb's Park =

Public Park in Northern Ireland

Coordinates: 55.002°N 7.311°W

St. Columb’s Park is a 70-acre (28 ha) municipal park in Derry, Northern Ireland. The park is named after St. Columba, who is the city's patron saint. The park contains the ruins of a medieval church, an 18th-century manor house, as well as many modern amenities such as a leisure centre and sports pitches.

The park has undergone many improvement works in recent decades as part of a redevelopment of the wider area. In 2011 the Peace Bridge was opened, which provides the park with a direct connection into the heart of the city centre via the developed Ebrington Square which hosted the British Army until 2002. In 2015 the new leisure centre, Foyle Arena, was opened at a cost of £12 million and contains a swimming pool, gym, and climbing wall as well as other amenities.

In July 2019 a revamped entrance into the park was opened at a cost of £385,000. The work changed the route of the road that leads to St. Columb’s Park House to improve safety and included a grand new entrance gate. Work is also being done to reopen the old walled garden of the manor house.

Since the completion of the Waterside Greenway the park has a direct pedestrian and cycle path that connects to both the Peace Bridge and Gransha Park. There are plans to extend the Greenway further which will connect Strathfoyle directly to the park.

== History ==
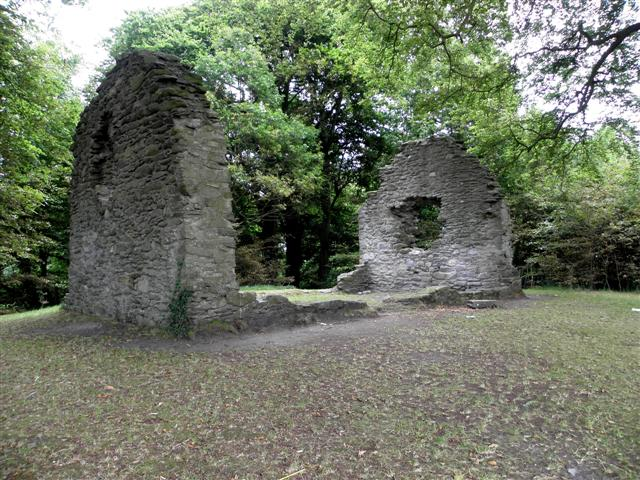
Ruins of St Brecan's Church

Contained within the park are the ruins of the medieval St. Brecan’s Church. The history of the site dates back to at least the 12th century, although most of the original church was demolished in the mid-15th century as the Bishop for the area wished to use the stones to build a palace. Whilst the current ruins were originally built in the late 16th century, they may incorporate some features of the earlier church.

At the centre of the park is St. Columb’s Park House, which was built in 1788 by Lieutenant John Rea, an officer in the Royal Navy. The estate was passed down through his daughter into the wealthy Hill family, who were baronets and owned the nearby Brooke Hall. The Hill family crest is still visible above the entrance to the park house. The estate subsequently passed onto the Cooke family in the 1890s, before it was bought by the council in 1937 for a total of £4972 (equating to roughly £340,000 in 2019) and opened to the public in 1939.

During WWII the estate was requisitioned by the British Army, due to its proximity to Ebrington Barracks and Clooney Base. It was used during the war as a military hospital to treat those who’d been injured during the Battle of the Atlantic. After the war the hospital continued to be used by the health board until 1985.

After falling into disrepair, the Park House was renovated in 1993 and re-opened to the public. As part of the 2012 London Olympics flame relay, the running track in the park hosted the Derry stop.

== Amenities ==
The park is home to many facilities that can be used or rented by members of the public. These include:

- Foyle Arena – Leisure centre which includes a gym and a climbing wall
- Tennis courts
- All weather sports pitches
- Running Track
- Children’s play area
- Adventure play area (currently closed to the public)
- Walled garden

== Art ==
There are also several pieces of public art within St. Columb's Park. Amongst them is a bronze statue of the park's namesake, St. Columba, releasing a dove whilst gesturing across the river towards the city. Furthermore outside of Foyle Arena there is a statue called 'Judo Players' by Northern Irish artist F.E. McWilliam. The piece was originally commissioned in 1980 and was moved to its current location after the completion of Foyle Arena in 2015.
