= 1964–65 Irish League =

Irish League
- Season: 1964–65
- Champions: Derry City; 1st Irish title
- Matches played: 132
- Goals scored: 527 (3.99 per match)
- Top goalscorer: Kenny Halliday; Dennis Guy (19 goals each)

Location of teams in the Irish League from 1949–1972
Location of Belfast-based teams in the Irish League from 1949–1971

The 1964–65 Irish League was the 64th edition of the Irish League, the highest level of league competition in Northern Irish football. The league consisted of 12 teams, and Derry City won the championship.

== League standings ==
Pos	Team	Pld	W	D	L	GF	GA	GR	Pts	Qualification
1	Derry City (C)	22	15	5	2	62	32	1.938	35	Qualification for the European Cup preliminary round
2	Coleraine	22	13	4	5	54	26	2.077	30	Qualification for the European Cup Winners' Cup first round
3	Crusaders	22	11	5	6	46	32	1.438	27	
4	Glenavon	22	12	2	8	61	35	1.743	26	
5	Linfield	22	10	5	7	54	40	1.350	25	
6	Ballymena United	22	10	5	7	50	44	1.136	25	
7	Glentoran	22	9	6	7	33	38	0.868	24	
8	Bangor	22	7	4	11	42	44	0.955	18	
9	Distillery	22	8	2	12	41	44	0.932	18	
10	Portadown	22	5	8	9	33	37	0.892	18	
11	Ards	22	5	6	11	34	55	0.618	16	
12	Cliftonville	22	1	0	21	17	100	0.170	2	

Source: rsssf.com
(C) Champions

== Results ==
Home \ Away	ARD	BAN	BLM	CLI	COL	CRU	DIS	DER	GLV	GLT	LIN	POR
Ards		1–1	2–3	4–2	1–5	1–4	0–4	3–3	2–0	1–4	0–1	3–0
Bangor	1–1		4–2	7–0	1–3	2–0	2–4	0–2	2–3	2–2	3–4	4–3
Ballymena United	4–1	3–0		3–1	0–4	1–0	1–1	3–5	3–1	0–2	3–2	0–1
Cliftonville	1–2	1–3	2–8		0–5	0–3	0–4	1–3	0–10	0–4	1–5	0–4
Coleraine	2–1	4–1	2–2	4–1		4–2	2–1	1–2	3–0	0–0	3–1	1–1
Crusaders	1–1	1–0	0–0	5–0	2–0		3–1	4–1	2–1	1–0	1–8	1–1
Distillery	2–1	1–3	1–2	6–1	0–2	0–6		2–3	1–4	1–2	4–2	2–0
Derry City	5–1	2–1	3–3	10–1	1–0	3–1	2–2		6–1	2–0	2–0	4–3
Glenavon	7–2	3–0	1–2	3–2	3–1	2–4	3–1	3–0		6–0	1–1	4–0
Glentoran	2–2	1–1	3–2	0–3	3–2	2–1	2–0	0–1	3–2		1–1	1–1
Linfield	3–3	2–1	5–2	6–0	1–4	2–2	0–3	1–1	0–3	4–1		2–0
Portadown	0–1	1–3	3–3	1–0	2–2	2–2	3–0	1–1	0–0	5–0	1–3	

Source: Irish League Archive
Legend: Blue = home team win; Yellow = draw; Red = away team win.

== Top scorers ==
Pos	Player	Club	Pld	Goals
1	Denis Guy	Glenavon	18	19
=	Ken Halliday	Coleraine	21	19
3	Fay Coyle	Derry City	19	17
=	Arthur Thomas	Ballymena United	21	17
=	Jim Weatherup	Crusaders	22	17
6	Billy Ferguson	Linfield	21	14
=	Billy Johnston	Glenavon	16	14
=	Phil Scott	Linfield	19	14
9	Danny Hale	Crusaders	20	12
=	Mal McDonnell	Ballymena United	17	12
=	Ron Mowatt	Ards	19	12
