= Peter Burke (Irish footballer) =

Irish association footballer

Peter Burke was an Irish footballer. After serving in the Irish Army, Burke joined newly formed Derry City F.C.. On 22 August 1929, he scored the club's first ever goal in the Irish League, in front of a crowd of 7,500 people against Glentoran at Derry City's home ground, Brandywell Stadium.
