= A515 road (Northern Ireland) =

Road in Northern Ireland

Coordinates: 55.01582°N 7.28711°W

A515

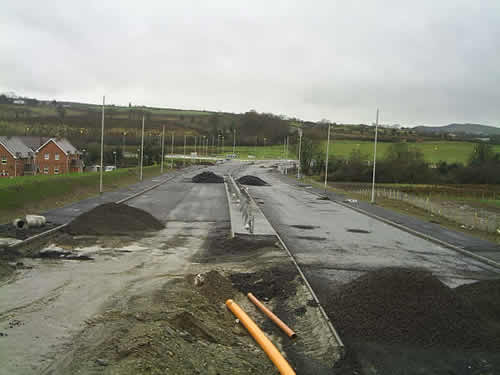
- A515 construction works viewed west along the Skeoge Link towards Buncrana Road from the Upper Galliagh Road

Route information
- Existed: March 2008–present

Location
- Country: United Kingdom
- Constituent country: Northern Ireland

Road network
- Roads in Northern Ireland; Motorways; A roads in Northern Ireland

The A515 Skeoge Link is a road in Northern Ireland which was designed to complete the route between Foyle Bridge in County Londonderry and County Donegal. It is part of a larger project to link County Donegal with Belfast. The total construction cost was £5 million.

== Construction ==
Skeoge Link Road is a road scheme that was constructed along the northwestern periphery of Derry. This road had been called for going back as far as the 1980s to relieve traffic from the already congested Buncrana Road which is the A2 and other roads within the Galliagh and Steelstown Area. It was reported in February 2008 in the Derry Journal that the scheme is set to open in March of the same year. The road opened to traffic on 20 March 2020.

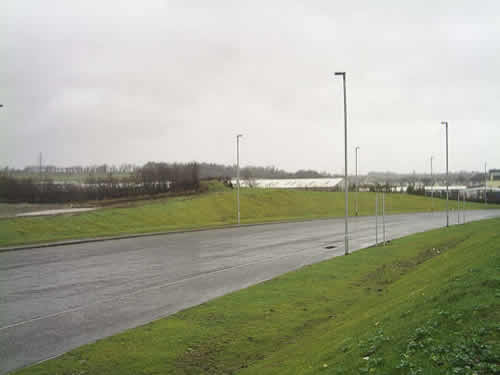
The single-carriageway section of the Skeoge Link (to the east of the eastern roundabout)
