= Willie Ross (football manager) =

Scottish footballer and manager

Personal information
- Place of birth: Scotland
- Date of death: 9 May 1985
- Place of death: Derry, Northern Ireland
- Position: Forward

Senior career*
Years	Team	Apps	(Gls)
1930–1934	Airdrieonians		
1934–1939	Derry City		
1939–1940	Cork City		
1940–1942	Cork United		
1942–1943	Derry City		

Managerial career
- 1943–1953: Derry City
- 1953–1954: Portadown
- 1960–1968: Derry City
- * Club domestic league appearances and goals

Willie Ross was a Scottish football player and manager.
