= 1948–49 Irish Cup =

Tournament details
- Country: Northern Ireland
- Teams: 16

Final positions
- Champions: Derry City (1st win)
- Runners-up: Glentoran

Tournament statistics
- Matches played: 21
- Goals scored: 70 (3.33 per match)

The 1948–49 Irish Cup was the 69th edition of the Irish Cup, the premier knock-out cup competition in Northern Irish football.

The defending champions were Linfield, after they defeated Coleraine 3–0 in the 1947–48 final. However, they went out in the first round after a 2–0 defeat to Glentoran.

Derry City went on to win the cup for the first time, defeating the Glens 3–1 in the final.

== Results ==
=== First round ===
Team 1	Score	Team 2
Ards	0–3	Bangor
Ballyclare Comrades	0–1	Cliftonville
Ballymena United	1–2	Coleraine
Brantwood	1–3	Derry City
Distillery	5–2	Linfield Swifts
Dundela	4–4	Glenavon
Linfield	0–2	Glentoran
Portadown	1–0	Belfast Celtic

==== Replay ====
Team 1	Score	Team 2
Glenavon	4–0	Dundela

=== Quarter-finals ===
Team 1	Score	Team 2
Bangor	1–1	Derry City
Cliftonville	1–3	Glentoran
Distillery	2–1	Coleraine
Portadown	3–1	Glenavon

==== Replay ====
Team 1	Score	Team 2
Derry City	3–3	Bangor

==== Second replay ====
Team 1	Score	Team 2
Bangor	1–1	Derry City

==== Third replay ====
Team 1	Score	Team 2
Derry City	1–0	Bangor

=== Semi-finals ===
Team 1	Score	Team 2
Derry City	2–0	Distillery
Glentoran	2–2	Portadown

==== Replay ====
Team 1	Score	Team 2
Portadown	1–1	Glentoran

==== Second replay ====
Team 1	Score	Team 2
Glentoran	3–0	Portadown

=== Final ===
16 April 1949

Derry City	3–1	Glentoran
Colvin 28'; Hermon 51'; Cannon 88'	Report	Peacock 25'

Windsor Park, Belfast
Attendance: 27,000
Referee: Peter Craigmyle (Aberdeen)
