= Ebrington Barracks =

Barracks in Derry, Northern Ireland

- Derry, Northern Ireland
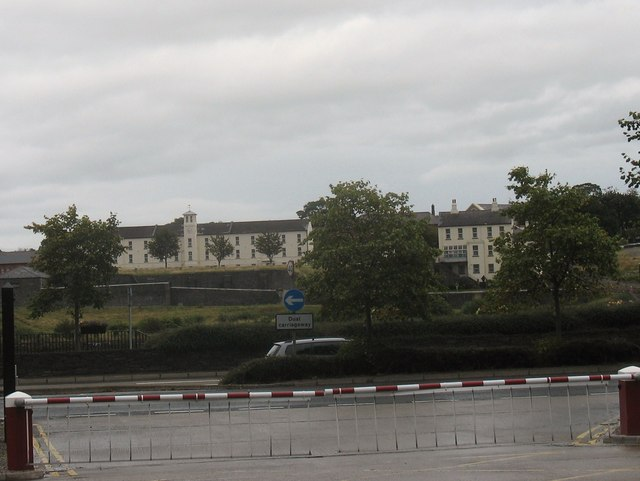
- Ebrington Barracks

Site information
- Type: Barracks
- Owner: Ministry of Defence
- Operator: British Army

Location
- Location within Northern Ireland
- Coordinates: 54.99834°N 7.31083°W

Site history
- Built: 1841
- In use: 1841–2002

Garrison information
- Occupants: 8 Infantry Brigade

Ebrington Barracks was a military installation on the east bank of the River Foyle in Derry, Northern Ireland.

== History ==
The present barracks, named after Hugh Fortescue, Viscount Ebrington (later Earl Fortescue), were built on the site in 1841.

=== First World War ===
At the start of the First World War, the barracks were occupied by 1st Battalion Cheshire Regiment who proceeded to France with the Expeditionary Force and landed at le Havre on 16 August 1914.

=== Second World War ===
At the start of the Second World War the barracks were home to 2nd Battalion, the South Wales Borderers, before they were mobilised. During the latter part of the War part of the base was handed over to Royal Navy to become HMS Ferret. Munitions were stored at NAD Kilnappy and fuel at a fuel farm at Lisahally.

=== The Troubles ===
During the Troubles the barracks were the base of 8 Infantry Brigade. In March 1973 the Provisional IRA bombed the compound causing damage but no injuries. On 11 January 1974 the Official Irish Republican Army killed two civilians who worked as contractors for the British Army when they exploded a bomb under their car as they left the barracks. On 14 December 1993: two soldiers were wounded by a trip wire bomb blast in a fence at a railway bordering the facilities.

=== Dissident republican attacks ===
In April 2000 the Real Irish Republican Army lowered a device consisting of 5 lb of homemade explosives over the perimeter fence using ropes, and the bomb subsequently exploded damaging the fence and the guardhouse. Then in January 2001 the Real Irish Republican Army were responsible for a mortar attack on the barracks: one mortar landed inside the perimeter fence of the base after being fired from a parked van but no one was injured.

=== Closure and redevelopment ===
The barracks were closed when 8 Infantry Brigade moved to Shackleton Barracks in 2003 and the area in front of the barracks was redeveloped as Ebrington Square in 2011. The Peace Bridge, built across the River Foyle between the main part of the city on the West and Ebrington Square on the East, was opened in June 2011.
