= Waterside, Derry =

- Coordinates: 54°59′54″N 07°17′35″W

Map of Waterside

The Waterside (Ulster-Scots: Wattèrbroo, Irish: Taobh an Uisce) generally refers to the part of Derry on the east bank of the River Foyle. Traditionally, the Waterside ends at the Caw roundabout near the Foyle Bridge. Areas such as Eglinton and Limavady are not part of the Waterside.

The Waterside once had a majority of Protestant and unionists but further demographic change has occurred in this area, and like the rest of Derry City much of the Waterside is mainly Irish Catholic and nationalist. During the Troubles, the Waterside's Protestant population grew, probably as a result of Protestants moving there from the west side of the river. The Protestant and loyalist population remains predominant in certain areas of the Waterside, including the Irish Street area.

The Waterside contains the city's main hospital, Altnagelvin, as well as St. Columb's Park and the former Ebrington Military Barracks. It is linked to the west side of the city via the Foyle Bridge, Craigavon Bridge, and the Peace Bridge.

== Transport ==
Derry~Londonderry railway station is in this area, and is often referred to as Waterside station, a name it held when the city of Derry had three stations, the other two being the Graving Dock station and the Foyle Road station.
