= Peace Bridge (Foyle) =

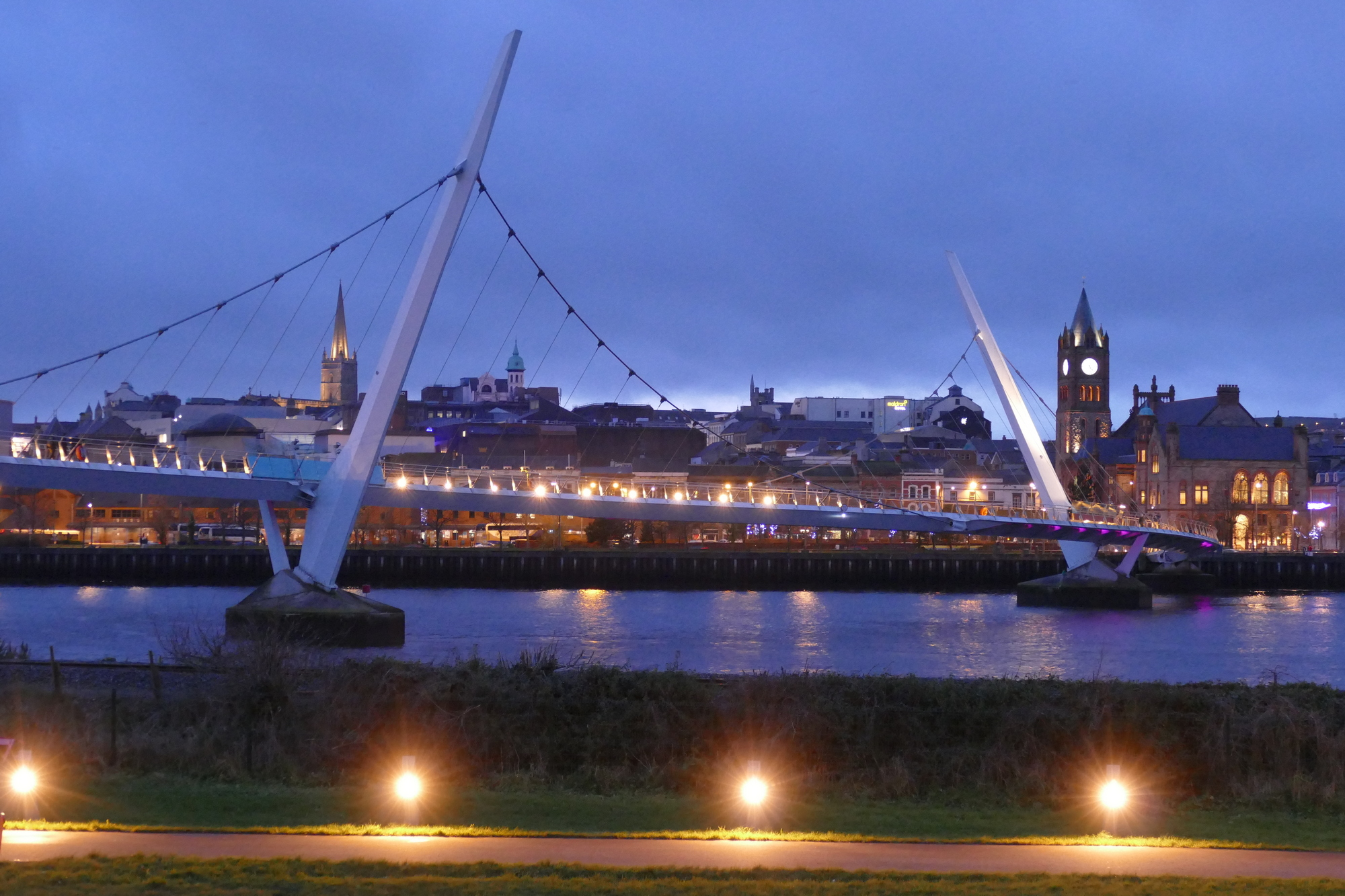
- Coordinates: 54.9980°N 7.3163°W
- Carries: Cyclists; Pedestrians
- Crosses: River Foyle
- Locale: Derry, Northern Ireland

Characteristics
- Design: Self-anchored suspension bridge
- Total length: 235 m (771 ft)
- Width: 4 m (13 ft)
- Longest span: 101 m (331 ft)

History
- Fabrication by: Rowecord Engineering
- Opened: 25 June 2011

Location
- Interactive map of Peace Bridge

The Peace Bridge is a cycle and foot bridge across the River Foyle in Derry, Northern Ireland. It opened on 25 June 2011, connecting Ebrington Square with the rest of the city centre. It is the most recent of three bridges in the city, the others being the Craigavon Bridge and the Foyle Bridge. The 235 metres (771 ft) bridge was designed by AECOM, who also designed the Sutong Yangtze River Bridge, and Wilkinson Eyre Architects, who also designed the Gateshead Millennium Bridge.

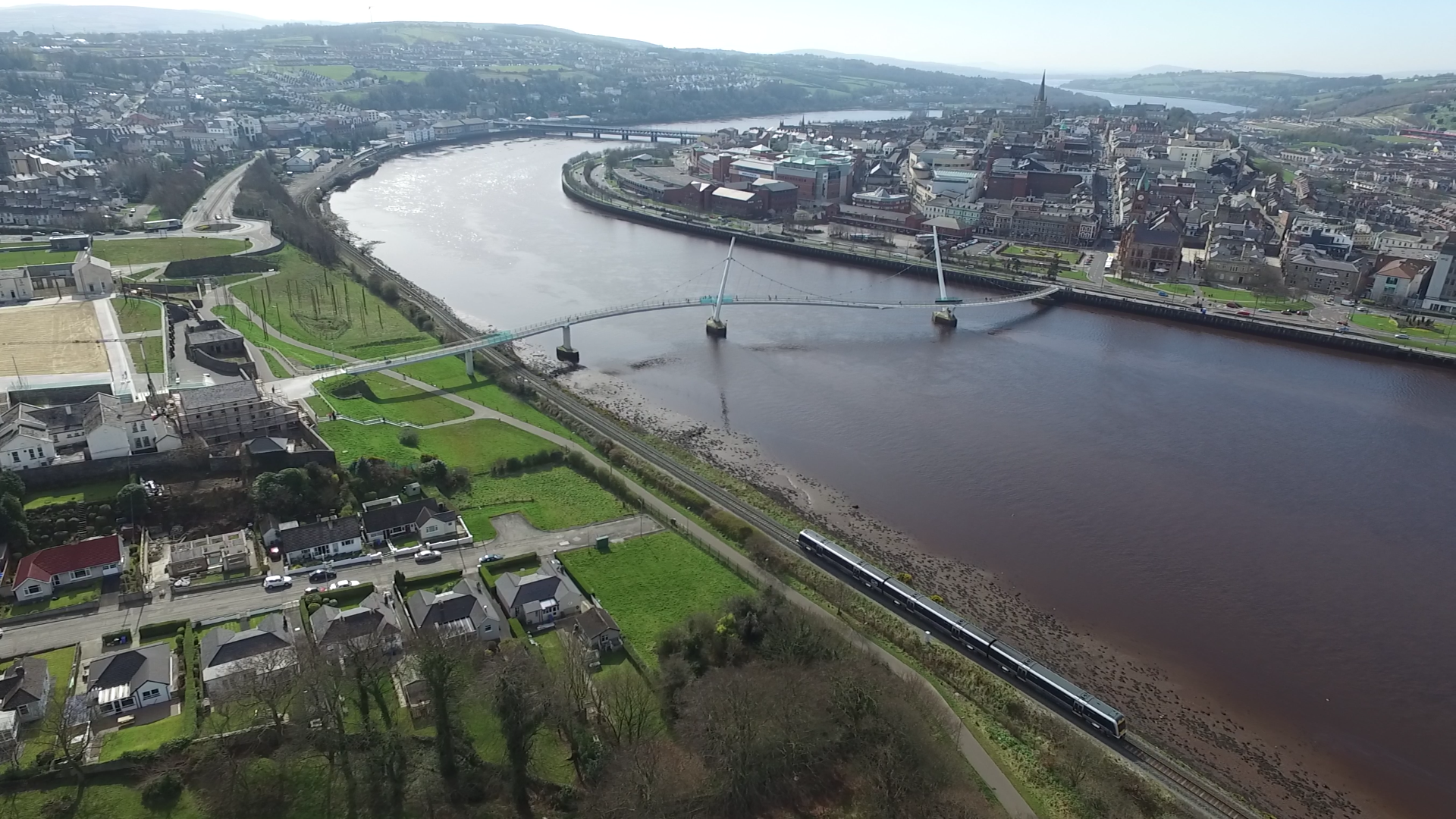
View of the Peace Bridge showing both sides of the river and a passing train

The bridge was opened to the public by EU Commissioner for Regional Policy, Johannes Hahn; accompanied by the First and deputy First Ministers, Peter Robinson and Martin McGuinness; and the Irish Taoiseach Enda Kenny. It is intended to improve relations between the largely unionist Waterside on the east bank with the largely nationalist Cityside on the west bank, by improving access between these areas, as part of wider regeneration plans. The bridge also provides a crossing over the railway line approaching Waterside station. The asymmetrical bridge, which is 235 m (770 ft) long and 4 m (13 ft) metre wide, is supported by two sloping pillars and symbolises a coming-together of the two communities. Its curved footpath, track and cycleway link the Guildhall, in the centre of the city, with Ebrington Square in the Waterside area, and St. Columb's Park.

== Funding ==
The bridge was funded jointly by the Department for Social Development (NI), the Department of the Environment, Community and Local Government along with matching funding, totalling £14 million, from the SEUPB Peace III programme.

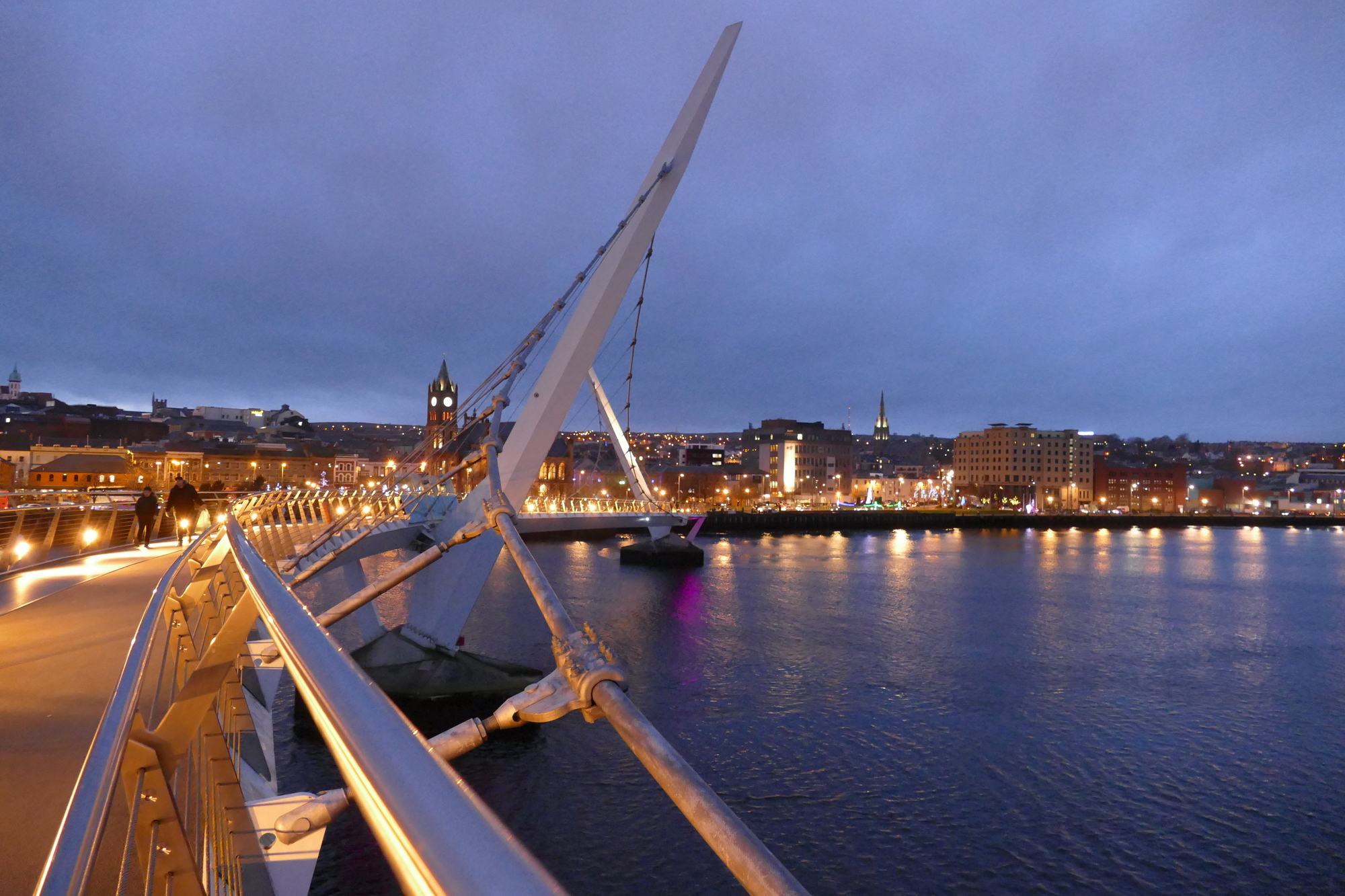
The bridge at dusk

Next bridge upstream	River Foyle	Next bridge downstream
Craigavon Bridge	Peace Bridge (Foyle)	Foyle Bridge
