= Craigavon Bridge =

Double decked bridge

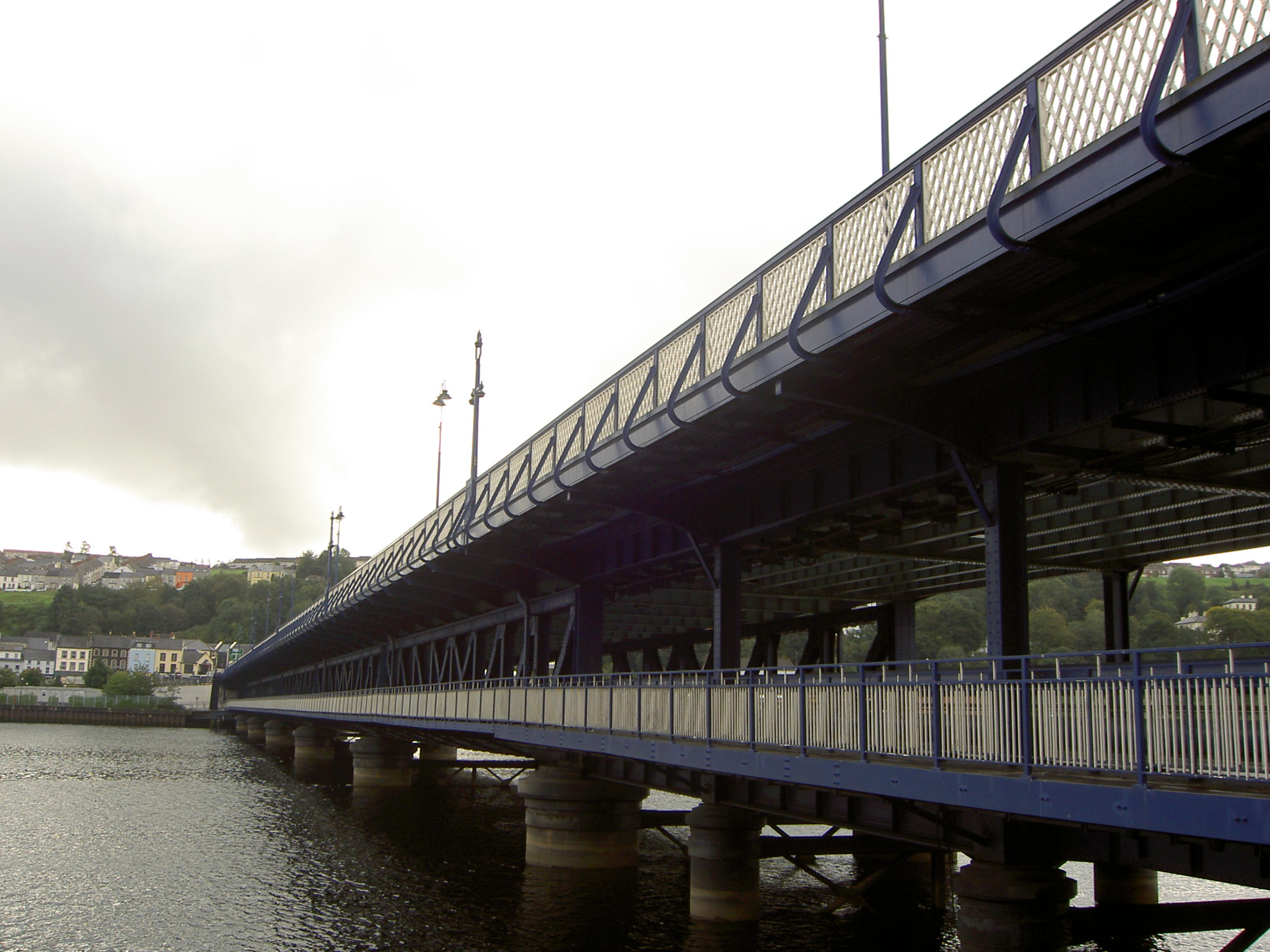
- Coordinates: 54°59′26″N 7°19′04″W
- Carries: A2
- Crosses: River Foyle
- Locale: Derry

Characteristics
- Total length: 275m

History
- Architect: Matthew A. Robinson
- Construction start: Late 1920s
- Construction end: 1933
- Opened: 1933

The Craigavon Bridge is one of three bridges in Derry, Northern Ireland. It crosses the River Foyle further south than the Foyle Bridge and Peace Bridge. It is one of only a few double-decker road bridges in Europe. It was named after Lord Craigavon, the first Prime Minister of Northern Ireland.

The present bridge was designed by the City Architect, Matthew A. Robinson. Construction began in the late 1920s and was finished in 1933. The lower deck of the bridge originally carried a railway line for freight wagons, but that was replaced by a road in 1968. At each end, a silhouetted mural of a railway station stands to mark the former railway. On 3 July 1968, as part of a series of protests against housing conditions in Derry, the Derry Housing Action Committee (DHAC) held a sit-down protest on the newly opened second deck of the Craigavon Bridge.

Hands Across the Divide, a pair of bronze statues forming a sculpture, produced by Derry sculptor Maurice Harron, are situated at the west end of bridge in Carlisle Square.

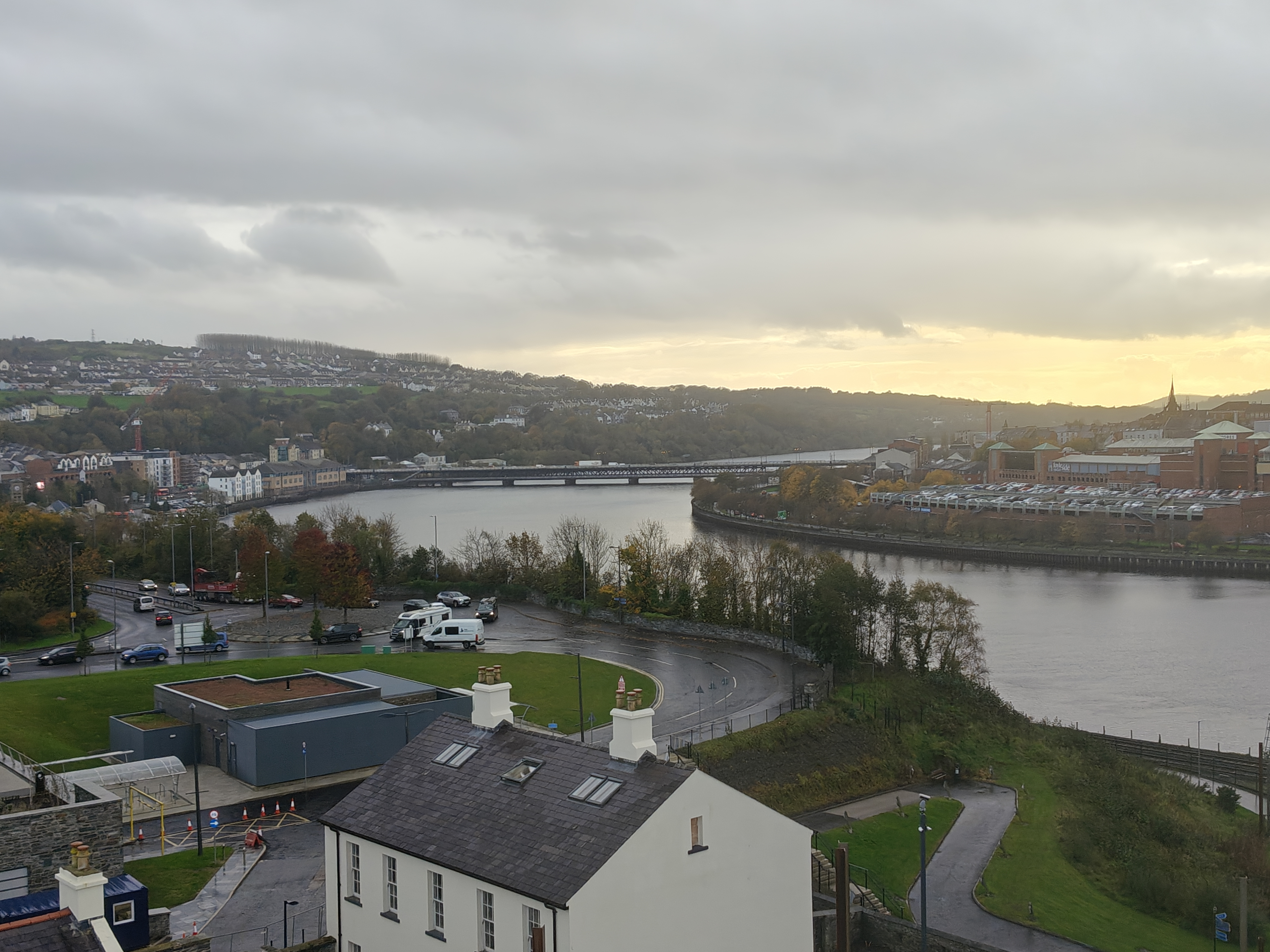
View of bridge from Ebrington Square.

== History ==
Craigavon Bridge is one of three bridges to be built in the area. The first bridge over the River Foyle was a wooden one, assembled in the United States and transported to Derry. It was built from 1789–1791, and sited between Bridge Street and Fountain Hill, about 90 metres north of the present bridge. The structure included a drawbridge because the inhabitants of Strabane had navigational rights on the river.

In 1863, the steel Carlisle Bridge was erected, a little further upstream, almost where Craigavon Bridge is today, to replace the old wooden bridge.

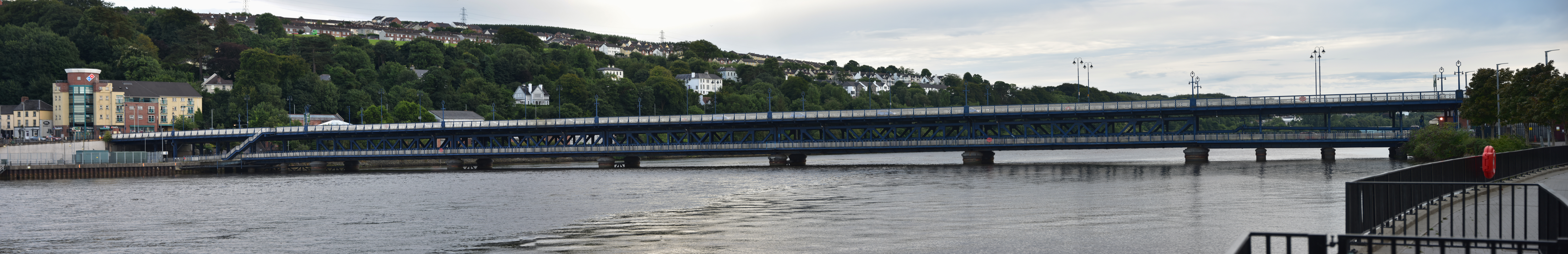
Panorama of Craigavon Bridge in 2018

Next bridge upstream	River Foyle	Next bridge downstream
Lifford Bridge	Craigavon	Peace Bridge (Foyle)
