= Avec =

Austrian singer (born 1995)

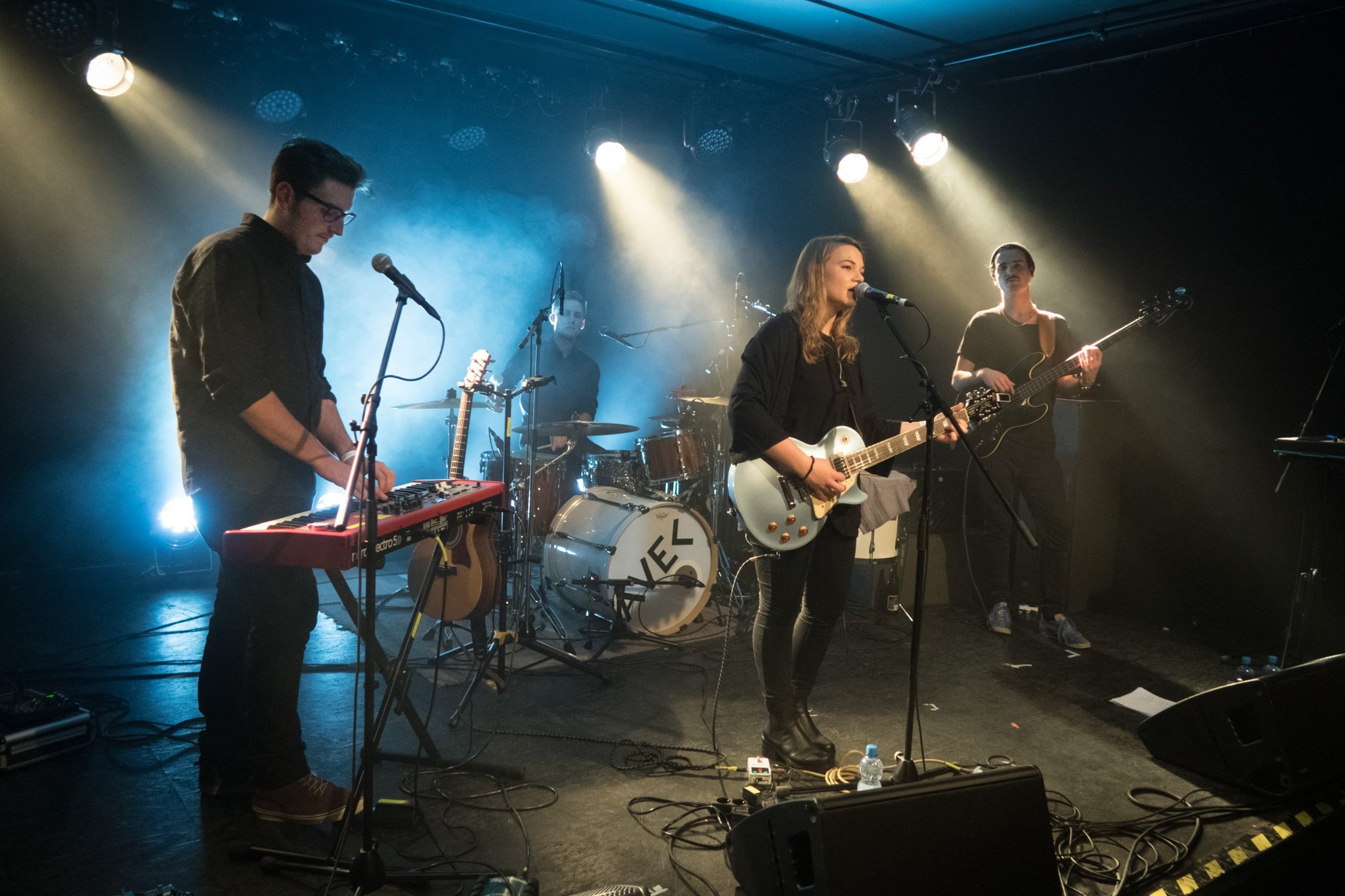
- Avec in November 2016

Background information
- Born: Miriam Hufnagl; 1995 (age 30–31); Upper Austria, Austria
- Occupations: Singer; songwriter
- Instruments: Vocals; guitar
- Labels: Earcandy Recordings; Jim Bob Records

Miriam Hufnagl (born 1995), known professionally as Avec (stylized in all caps), is an Austrian singer, songwriter and musician.

== Early life ==
Hufnagl grew up in Vöcklabruck, Upper Austria, and initially learned the violin. At the age of twelve, she wrote her first songs in English, and at fourteen, she taught herself to play the guitar, with Taylor Swift among her role models at the time. She commuted to Salzburg to study to become a teacher (History and English).

== Career ==
In the 2015 ballad "Granny," Avec processed her own experience of dealing with her grandmother's Alzheimer's disease; the song was also used in a TV commercial for a German private broadcaster. She is accompanied by Andreas Häuserer (electric guitar, backing vocals, co-producer), Veronika Sterrer (piano, backing vocals), Thomas Gieferl (drums, percussion, backing vocals), and Matthias Zeindlhofer (bass, trombone, percussion, backing vocals). In November 2015, Avec was named FM4 Soundpark Act of the Month. At the 2016 Amadeus Awards, she was nominated for Heartbeats in the categories Artist of the Year and Alternative, as well as for the FM4 Award. Heartbeats was also nominated for the Recording Studio Award. In September 2016, she released her debut album, What If We Never Forget, which entered the Austrian album charts, and began a tour through Austria, Germany, Hungary, and Switzerland.

Her second album, Heaven/Hell, was released on 14 September 2018. In July 2019, Avec performed at the Vienna Popfest for the second time since her debut in the summer of 2016, in 2019 with a six-piece band, and in 2016 with two people. In February 2020, she released the single Dance Solo, in which she sang about a relationship breakup. At the end of March 2020, she released her third album, Homesick. In August 2022, she performed as the opening act for James Blunt.

In 2024, Avec founded the music label Jim Bob Records, named after the nickname Jim Bob, which her mother had given to her deceased brother, Avec's uncle. After his death, Avec dedicated the ballad "I Don't Pray" to her uncle. In January 2025, she released her fourth self-titled album, Avec.

== Discography ==
=== Studio albums ===
Title	Details	Peak chart positions
Title	Details	AUT
What If We Never Forget	Released: 23 September 2016; Label: Earcandy Recordings; Format: CD, download	71
Heaven / Hell	Released: 14 September 2018; Label: Earcandy Recordings; Format: CD, download	42
Homesick	Released: 27 March 2020; Label: Earcandy Recordings; Format: CD, download	13
Avec	Released: 24 January 2025; Label: Jim Bob Records; Format: CD, download	57
"—" denotes an album that did not chart or was not released in that territory.

=== Extended plays ===
- 2015: Heartbeats

=== Singles ===
- 2015: Granny
- 2015: Dead
- 2018: Under Water
- 2019: Home
- 2020: Dance Solo
- 2020: Mona
- 2021: I don't pray
- 2022: Nothing to Me

== Awards and nominations ==
Year	Award	Category	Work	Result	Ref.
2016	Amadeus Austrian Music Awards	Artist of the Year	Herself	Nominated	
2016	Amadeus Austrian Music Awards	Alternative	Herself	Nominated	
2016	Amadeus Austrian Music Awards	FM4 Award	Herself	Nominated	
2017	Amadeus Austrian Music Awards	Artist of the Year	Herself	Nominated	
2017	Amadeus Austrian Music Awards	FM4 Award	Herself	Nominated	
2019	Music Moves Europe Talent Awards	Singer-songwriter	Herself	Won	
2019	Amadeus Austrian Music Awards	Alternative	Herself	Won	
2019	Amadeus Austrian Music Awards	Best Sound	Herself	Nominated	
2019	Amadeus Austrian Music Awards	FM4 Award	Herself	Nominated	
2019	Hubert von Goisern Prize	None	Herself	Won	
2021	Amadeus Austrian Music Awards	FM4 Award	Herself	Nominated	
2021	Amadeus Austrian Music Awards	Alternative	Herself	Nominated	
