= Foyle Bridge =

Bridge in Derry, Northern Ireland

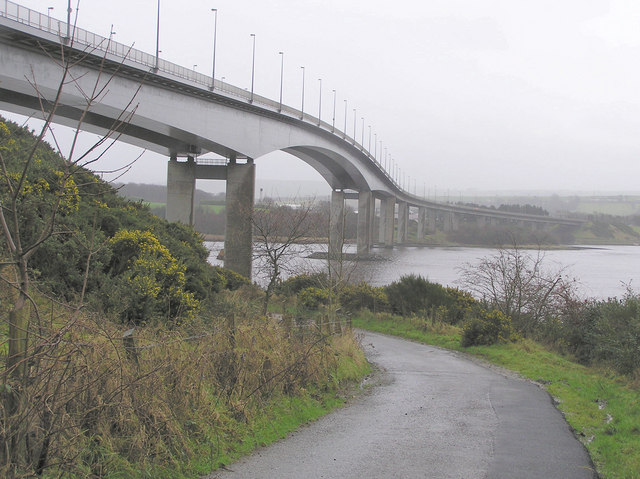
- Coordinates: 55°01′07″N 7°17′33″W
- Carries: A515
- Crosses: River Foyle
- Locale: Derry
- Preceded by: Peace Bridge
- Followed by: Lough Foyle Ferry

Characteristics
- Material: Concrete & Steel

History
- Opened: 1984

Location
- Interactive map of Foyle Bridge

The Foyle Bridge is a bridge in Derry, Northern Ireland. The central span of the bridge is the longest on the island of Ireland, at 234 metres (767 ft), and the whole suspended bridge structure including the approach spans is 866 metres long (2839 ft).

It crosses the River Foyle to the north of the city, and forms only the second of three bridges linking the city centre to the Waterside, the others being the Craigavon Bridge and the Peace Bridge walkway. Work on the bridge began in 1980 and it opened in October 1984. The seven approach spans on the east bank are of pre-stressed concrete box construction. The three main river spans are of steel box construction and were built by Harland and Wolff shipyard in Belfast in 6 segments, weighed up to 900 tonnes each, and then transported by barge and oceangoing tug to site where they were lifted into position. Between 2003 and 2005 the bridge underwent strengthening, resurfacing and other improvements, leading to widespread traffic disruption in the city. Total cost of the refurbishment work was £10.6 million. The road was built to four-lane dual carriageway standard, and carries the A515. By 2004 more than 30,000 vehicles used the bridge every day.

The bridge was built for the Roads Service of Northern Ireland by RDL- John Graham (Dromore) Joint Venture, with the consulting engineers being Ove Arup and Partners including D. C. Black Ltd. The value of the four-year construction contract was £15,765,000. It was the first bridge in Ireland to be built according to a "Design and Construct" system, whereby the same firm designed and constructed the bridge.

== History ==
The bridge crosses the Foyle at Madam's Bank, which is the same site as King James II's army chose to place their boom barrier during the Siege of Derry in 1688–1689. It is the third bridge across the River Foyle to be officially named "Foyle Bridge". The oldest Foyle Bridge still in existence, an iron railway bridge that crossed the Foyle near Porthall, a village just north of Lifford, carried the Great Northern Railway (Ireland) (the G.N.R.) line from Strabane and through The Laggan district in East Donegal. This railway line, which ran via St Johnston, had its terminus at Foyle Road in Derry. Parts of this bridge still stand. The other bridge with this name is better known as Lifford Bridge, a 1960s structure that was officially named "Foyle Bridge" when it opened. Lifford Bridge is a concrete road bridge between Lifford and Strabane.

== Incidents and accidents ==
In 1984, while drilling the steel parapets during the bridge's construction, Kevin Ross (35), was knocked off the side into the water below when drilling equipment he was using failed, resulting in said equipment losing its magnetic base capability and hitting him in the chest. He was retrieved by standby river safety staff on duty, but unfortunately did not survive.

In January 2005 during a storm, a lorry was blown off the bridge and its driver, Peter McGuinness, killed. An investigation was launched since the storm had not been unusually severe, and it was concluded that a freak gust had contributed to the accident. However, due to the danger from cross winds, the bridge is now closed to traffic when the weather is particularly windy. Windsocks and warning signs are in place at each end to alert the drivers of HGVs.

A new bridge management system was put in place following a review. When wind speeds reach the first trigger level of 30 mph (48 km/h), signs on the bridge will display an advisory speed limit of 30 mph (48 km/h). If the wind speeds increase to 40 mph (64 km/h), signs on the bridge approaches will direct high-sided vehicles to use the Craigavon Bridge instead. When the wind speed exceeds 50 mph (80 km/h) the Foyle Bridge will be closed to all vehicles. The new system, costing £800,000, has the capacity of automatically receiving information from the wind monitoring equipment on the bridge and displaying appropriate warnings and instructions on variable message signs. These signs are located at strategic points around the city on roads leading to the Foyle Bridge and entrances to the city, including on roads leading from the Republic of Ireland.

== Gallery ==
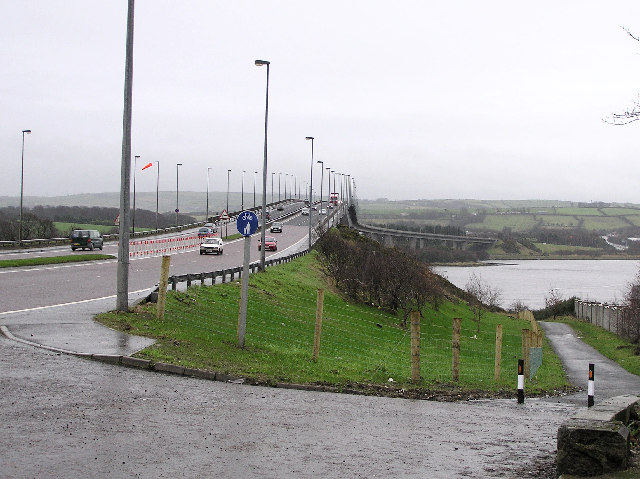
Foyle Bridge, cityside

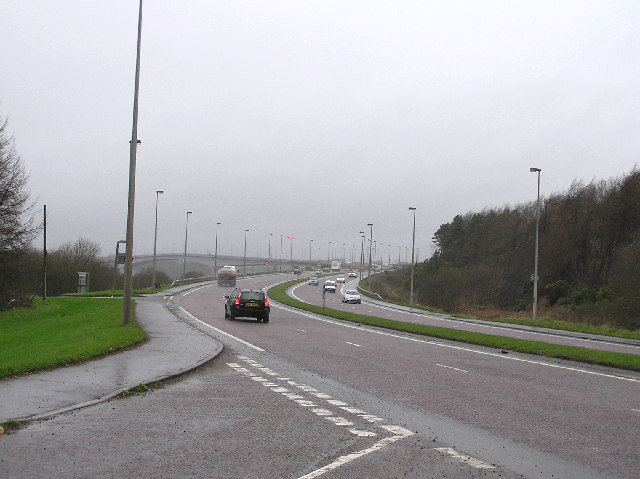
Foyle Bridge, east bank

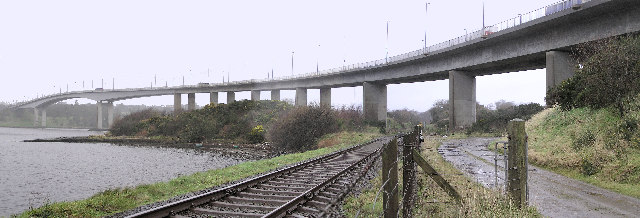
Foyle Bridge over the Belfast-Derry railway line

| Next bridge upstream | River Foyle | Next bridge downstream |
| Peace Bridge (Foyle) | Foyle Bridge | |
