= Ebrington Square =

Square in Derry, Northern Ireland

- Maintained by: The Executive Office
- Location: Waterside, Derry, Northern Ireland

Construction
- Inauguration: 14 February 2012

Other
- Website: https://yourebrington.com/

Ebrington Square is a public space and tourist attraction in Derry, Northern Ireland, built upon the former army parade ground at Ebrington Barracks. Although located in the Waterside area of Derry, it is connected to the city centre on the west bank of the River Foyle via the Peace Bridge. The square opened on 14 February 2012 after a period of regeneration and hosted a number of events during the city's time as UK City of Culture in 2013.

To the west of the square, adjoining the river, is Mute Meadow, an art installation comprising 40 pairs of columns, created by Turner Prize nominee Vong Phaophanit and Claire Oboussier. At night the columns are illuminated with colours drawn from the stained-glass used in the Guildhall windows. Unveiled in 2011 but soon in need of repairs, the installation's lights have been off since 2014.

== Gallery ==
Ebrington Clock Tower
