= Bruce (surname) =

The surname Bruce is a British surname of French origin. In Scotland, it is derived from Clan Bruce. In some cases it is derived from the French place name of Briouze in Normandy, (see Braose) while in others it appears to be derived from Brix in Normandy, or Bruz in Brittany, both in France.

The Swedish nobility Bruce of Scottish descent is extinct and most Bruces in Sweden instead descend from soldiers called Bruse (meaning buck or ram in Old West Norse) or Bruce by the army.

The surname is also common among a Ghanaian family of Accra of Euro-African ancestry.

Notable people with the surname include:

- Adam Bruce (born 1968), Scottish businessman
- Alexander Bruce (disambiguation)
- Alice Bruce (1867–1951), British educationist
- Andrew Bruce, 11th Earl of Elgin (born 1924), Scottish aristocrat, chief of the name of Bruce
- Angela Bruce (born 1951) British actress
- Brenda Bruce (1918–1996), British actress
- Ben Bruce (born 1988), English musician
- Benjamin F. Bruce (1811–1888), New York politician
- Cameron Bruce (born 1979), Australian-football professional
- Carlos Bruce (born 1959), Peruvian politician
- Carol Bruce (1919–2007), American actress and singer
- Catherine Fleming Bruce (born 1961), American politician
- Catherine Wolfe Bruce (1816–1900), American benefactor of the Harvard College Observatory
- Charles Bruce (disambiguation)
- Colin Bruce (disambiguation)
- David Bruce (disambiguation)
- Dominic Bruce (1915-2000), Colditz escaper
- Dylan Bruce (born 1980), Canadian actor
- Earle Bruce (1931–2018), American football coach
- Ed Bruce (1939–2021), American country music singer-songwriter
- Edgar Bruce (c. 1845–1901), English actor-manager
- Edward Bruce (disambiguation)
- Edward Bruce (c. 1280–1318), King of Ireland
- Edward Bruce, 1st Lord Kinloss (1548–1611), Scottish Judge
- Emily Bruce Roelofson (1832–1921), American composer
- Everend Lester Bruce (1884–1949), Canadian geologist
- F. F. Bruce (1910–1990), Scottish professor and Biblical scholar
- Fiona Bruce (born 1964), British television presenter
- Fiona Bruce (politician) (born 1957), British politician
- Frederick Bruce-Lyle (1953–2016), Ghanaian-born jurist and judge in several Caribbean countries

- William Bruce-Lyle (1919–?), Ghanaian jurist of Supreme Courts of Ghana and Zambia

- Frederick Nanka-Bruce (1878–1953), physician, journalist and politician of British Gold Coast colony
- Gail Bruce (1923–1998), American football player
- Geoffrey Bruce (mountaineer) (1896–1972), British army officer and Everest mountaineer
- George Bruce (disambiguation)
- Harriet Bruce-Annan (born 1965), Ghanaian programmer and humanitarian
- Harry Bruce (disambiguation)
- Ingrid Bruce (1940–2012), Swedish civil engineer
- Isaac Bruce (born 1972), American football wide receiver for the St. Louis Rams
- Jack Bruce (1943–2014), Scottish bass player with the band Cream
- Jacob Bruce (1669–1735), Russian statesman, military leader and scientist
- James Bruce (disambiguation)
- Jane Bruce (1847 or 1848–1907), Canadian teacher and principal
- Jay Bruce (born 1987), American Major League Baseball outfielder
- John Bruce (disambiguation)
- John Bruce-Gardyne Baron Bruce-Gardyne of Kirkden
- Jordyn Bruce (born 1998), American heptathlete
- Joseph Bruce (born 1972), known as Violent J, American rapper of duo Insane Clown Posse
- Josette Bruce (1920–1996), French novelist
- Joshua Harrison Bruce (1833–1891), American farmer and politician
- Lloyd Bruce (1907–1988), American baseball player
- Kate Bruce (1860–1946), American actress
- Ken Bruce (born 1951), Scottish radio presenter
- King Bruce, (1922–1997), Ghanaian composer, band leader and musician
- Lenny Bruce (1925–1966), American stand-up comedian, writer, social critic and satirist
- Lucinda Bruce-Gardyne, Scottish writer, entrepreneur and cookery expert
- Malcolm Bruce (born 1944), British politician
- Megan Bruce (born 2004), British racing driver
- Michael Bruce (disambiguation)
- Mrs Victor Bruce (1895–1990), British aviator, racing driver and businesswoman
- Nigel Bruce (1895–1953), British character actor
- Noel Bruce (born 1921), South African banker and businessman
- Patrick Henry Bruce (1881–1936), American cubist painter
- Philip Alexander Bruce (1856–1933), American historian specialized in the history of Virginia
- Robert Bruce (disambiguation)
- Rosslyn Bruce (1871–1956), English priest, naturalist and writer
- Rowena Mary Bruce (1915–1999), English chess master
- Sabrina Bruce, American military officer and politician
- Stanley Bruce (1883–1967), Prime Minister of Australia
- Steve Bruce (born 1960), British football manager
- Tammy Bruce (born 1962), American radio host, author, and political commentator
- Terry Bruce (politician) (born 1975), American politician, member of the Kansas Senate
- Terry L. Bruce (1944–2026), American politician, lawyer and educator from Illinois
- Theo Bruce (1923–2002), Australian athlete
- Theodore Bruce (1847–1911), South Australian auctioneer, politician and mayor of Adelaide
- Thomas Bruce (disambiguation)
- Vicki Bruce (born 1953), British psychologist
- Victor Bruce, 9th Earl of Elgin (1849–1917), Viceroy of India
- Vida Bruce, Ghanaian athlete
- Virginia Bruce (1910–1982), American actress
- W. H. Bruce (fl.1910–1930), businessman in Adelaide, South Australia
- William Bruce (disambiguation)

== See also ==
- Admiral Bruce (disambiguation)
- General Bruce (disambiguation)
- Governor Bruce (disambiguation)
- Judge Bruce (disambiguation)
- Senator Bruce (disambiguation)
