= James Bruce (disambiguation) =

James Bruce (1730–1794) was a Scottish traveller and travel writer.

James Bruce may also refer to:

- James Bruce (bishop) (died 1447), Bishop of Dunkeld, Chancellor of Scotland and Bishop of Glasgow
- James Bruce (minister) (c. 1660–1730), Irish Presbyterian minister
- James Bruce (comptroller) (c. 1670 – c. 1732), Member of Parliament for Marlborough and joint comptroller of British Army accounts
- Sir James Bruce (Chief Justice) (1691–1749), Chief Justice of Barbados
- Sir James Bruce, 2nd Baronet (1788–1836), Irish soldier
- Jacob Bruce (1669–1735), or James Bruce, Russian field-marshal, founder of the Russian branch of the Scottish family
- James Bruce (1732–1791), Governor general of Saint Petersburg and last male member of the Russian branch
- James Bruce (merchant) (1763–1837), Virginia merchant and planter, father of James Coles Bruce and third wealthiest American of his era
- James Bruce (1769–1798), Member of Parliament for Marlborough
- James Bruce (author) (1808–1861), journalist and author
- James Bruce, 8th Earl of Elgin (1811–1863), Anglo-Scottish diplomat
- Sir James Andrew Thomas Bruce (1846–1921), Royal Navy admiral
- James Bruce (English cricketer) (born 1979), English cricketer
- James Bruce (Zimbabwean cricketer) (born 1993), Zimbabwean cricketer
- James Bruce (farmer) (1927–2013), Scottish farmer and forester
- James Cabell Bruce (1892–1980), American businessman and banker, and U.S. ambassador to Argentina
- James Coles Bruce (1806–1865), Virginia planter and legislator
- James E. Bruce (1927–2008), politician in the American state of Kentucky
- J. W. Bruce (James William Bruce, born 1952), British mathematician

== See also ==
- James Bruce Falls
- James Bruce Round Barn, Freeport, United States
