= Robert Bruce (disambiguation) =

Robert the Bruce (1274–1329) was King of Scots, Earl of Carrick and 7th Lord of Annandale; victor at the Battle of Bannockburn.

Robert Bruce or Robert the Bruce may also refer to:

== Nobility, government and politics ==
- Robert de Brus, 1st Lord of Annandale (c. 1070–1142), founder of Gisborough Priory
- Robert de Brus, 2nd Lord of Annandale (died c. 1189 or 1194), Lord of Annandale
- Robert III de Brus, eldest son of the 2nd lord, predeceased his father
- Robert de Brus, 4th Lord of Annandale (c. 1195–1226), married Isabel, second daughter of David of Scotland
- Robert de Brus, 5th Lord of Annandale (c. 1210–1295), claimant to the Scottish crown following the death of the Maid of Norway
- Robert de Brus, 6th Lord of Annandale (1253–1304), father of the king
- Robert Bruce, Lord of Liddesdale (died 1332), illegitimate son of Robert the Bruce
- Robert Bruce, 2nd Baron of Clackmannan (died 1403)
- Robert Bruce, 3rd Baron of Clackmannan (died 1436)
- Robert Bruce, 1st Earl of Ailesbury (1626–1685), English politician
- Robert Bruce (Yukon politician) (1948–2023), Canadian politician, speaker of the Yukon Legislative Assembly
- Robert Randolph Bruce (1861–1942), lieutenant-governor of British Columbia, 1926–1931
- C. Robert Bruce (born 1962), Indian politician
- Robert Bruce (New Zealand politician) (1843–1917), Scottish-born, New Zealand politician and conservationist
- Robert P. Bruce (1862–1949), member of the Virginia Senate
- Robert Preston Bruce (1851–1893), British Liberal Party politician
- Robert Bruce (Lord Broomhall) (died 1652)

== Sports ==
- Robert Bruce (footballer) (1895–1968), Scottish footballer
- Bobbie Bruce (1906–1978), Scottish international footballer
- Robert Bruce (wrestler) (1943–2009), Scottish-born New Zealand professional wrestler and talent agent
- Robert Bruce (swimmer) (born 1969), Australian former swimmer
- Robert Bruce (rugby union) (1922–2001), Scottish rugby union player
- Robert Bruce (racing driver) (1967–2025), American stock car racing driver and crew chief
- Bob Bruce (1933–2017), American baseball player

== Entertainment ==
- Robert the Bruce (film), a 2019 film about Robert the Bruce King of Scots
- Robert the Bruce (wargame), a 1977 wargame
- Robert Bruce (Scottish composer) (1915–2012), composer and lecturer
- Robert Bruce (opera), an 1846 pastiche opera with music taken from works by Gioachino Rossini
- Robert Bruce (rapper) (born 1970), American rapper, Psychopathic Records don, and professional wrestler
- Robert C. Bruce (1914–2003), American animation voice actor

== Other people ==
- Robert Bruce of Kinnaird (1554–1631), moderator of the General Assembly of the Church of Scotland in 1588 and again in 1592
- Robert Bruce (chancellor) (1778–1846), professor and pastor, first chancellor of the University of Pittsburgh, 1819–1935 and 1836–1843
- Robert Bruce, Lord Kennet (1718–1785), Scottish advocate, legal scholar and judge
- Robert Bruce (1668–1720), Russian general of Scottish background, brother of Jacob Bruce
- Robert Bruce (merchant adventurer), Scottish adventurer and son of chief justice of Barbados Sir James Bruce
- Robert Bruce (trader) (1789–1824), Scottish arms trader in Assam
- Robert Bruce (active 1870–1900), missionary who revised Henry Martyn's Bible translations into Persian
- Robert A. Bruce (1916–2004), American cardiologist
- Robert V. Bruce (1923–2008), American historian
- Robert Bruce (British Army officer, born 1813) (1813–1862), British Army officer
- Robert Bruce (British Army officer, born 1821) (1821–1891), British Army officer, colonel of the Queen's Royal Regiment
- Bob Bruce (British Army officer), British Army officer, former commander of 4th Mechanised Brigade
