= Letham =

Letham may refer to:

== Places ==
Letham is a common place-name element in Scotland, deriving from the Scottish Gaelic leathan, meaning "broad slope". Examples include:

- Letham, Angus
- Letham, Falkirk
- Letham, Fife
- Letham, Perth and Kinross, a suburb of Perth

== People ==
- David Letham (1923–2007), Scottish football player
- Isabel Letham (1899–1995), Australian pioneer surfboarder
- Margaret Letham (born 1956), lawn and indoor bowler
- Robert Letham, British biblical scholar and theologian
- Ronnie Letham (1949–2008), Scottish actor

== Other uses ==
- Letham Grange estate, Angus, Scotland
- Letham Grange railway station, a former station that served the estate
- Main character of Stay (2005 film), Henry Letham.
- Letham St Mark's Church, Perth

== See also ==
- Lethem (disambiguation)
