= Lunan Bay railway station =

Disused railway station in Inverkeilor, Angus

Lunan Bay
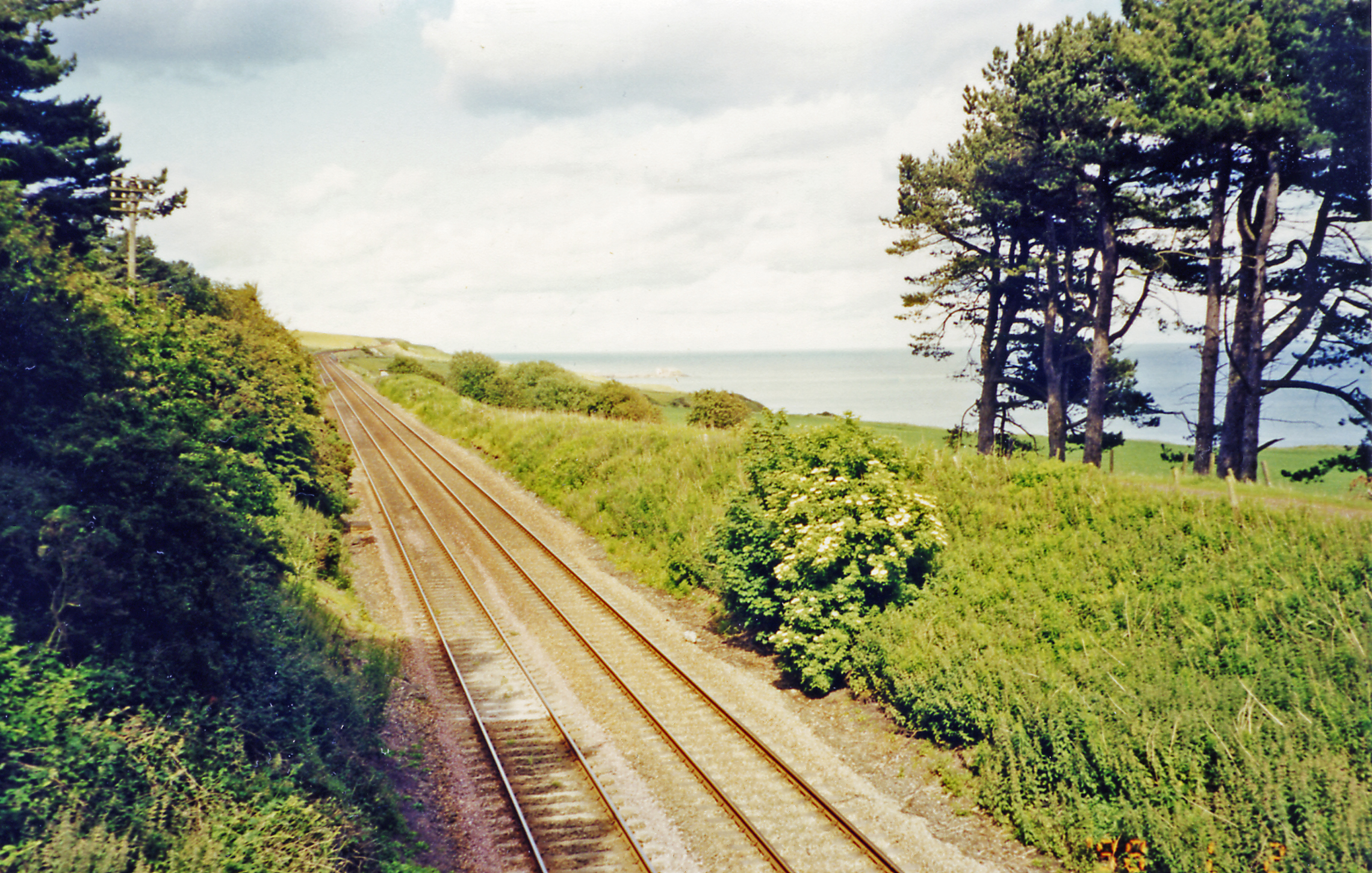
- The site of the station, looking northeast towards Montrose, in 2002

General information
- Location: Lunan, Angus; Scotland
- Coordinates: 56.662°N 2.5058°W
- Grid reference: NO690523
- Platforms: 2

Other information
- Status: Disused

History
- Original company: North British, Arbroath and Montrose Railway
- Pre-grouping: North British, Arbroath and Montrose Railway; North British Railway
- Post-grouping: LNER

Key dates
- 1 May 1883: Opened
- 22 September 1930: Closed to passengers
- 18 May 1964: Closed to goods
Location

Lunan Bay railway station served the village of Lunan, Angus, Scotland from 1883 to 1964 on the North British, Arbroath and Montrose Railway.

== History ==
The station opened on 1 May 1883 by the North British, Arbroath and Montrose Railway. The goods yard was to the west. The station closed to passengers on 22 September 1930 and closed to goods traffic on 18 May 1964.

Preceding station	Historical railways	Following station
Montrose; Line and station open	North British, Arbroath and Montrose Railway	Inverkeilor; Line open, station closed
