= George Brudenell-Bruce =

George Brudenell-Bruce may refer to:

- George Brudenell-Bruce, 2nd Marquess of Ailesbury (1804–1878)
- George Brudenell-Bruce, 4th Marquess of Ailesbury (1863–1894)
- George William James Chandos Brudenell-Bruce, 6th Marquess of Ailesbury (1873–1961), known as Chandos

== See also ==
- Brudenell-Bruce
- George Brudenell (disambiguation)
- George Bruce (disambiguation)
