= Cauldcots railway station =

Disused railway station in Cauldcots, Angus

Cauldcots
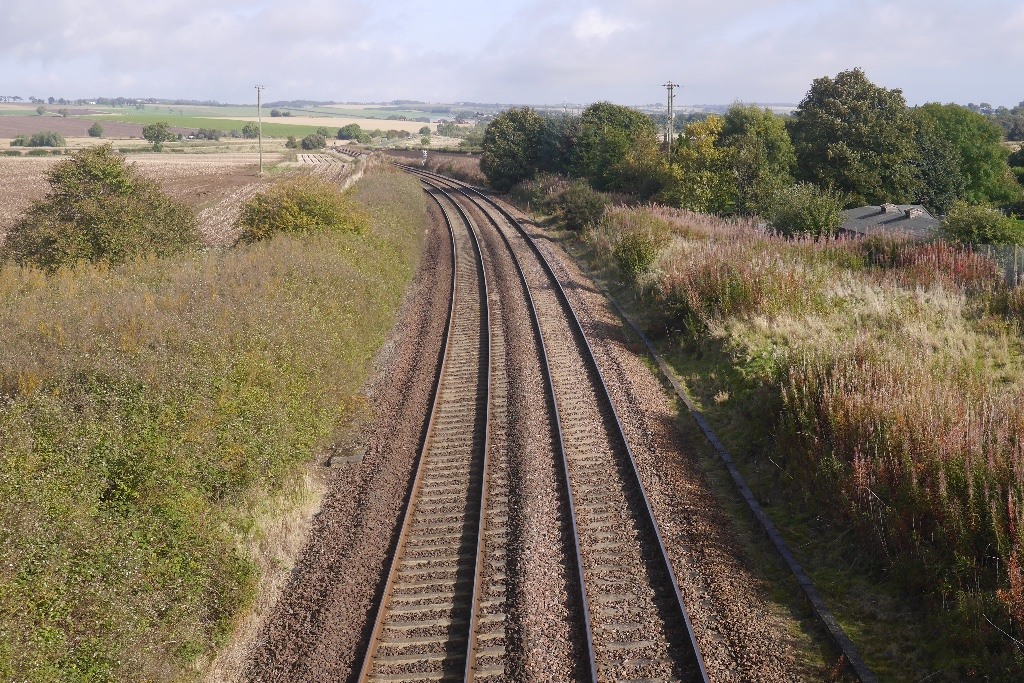
- The site of the station, looking north towards Montrose, in 2017

General information
- Location: Cauldcots, Angus; Scotland
- Coordinates: 56.6152°N 2.5602°W
- Grid reference: NO657471
- Platforms: 2

Other information
- Status: Disused

History
- Opened: October 1883; 142 years ago
- Closed: 22 September 1930; 95 years ago
- Original company: North British, Arbroath and Montrose Railway
- Pre-grouping: North British, Arbroath and Montrose Railway; North British Railway
- Post-grouping: LNER
Location

Cauldcots railway station served the hamlet of Cauldcots, Angus, Scotland, from 1883 to 1930 on the North British, Arbroath and Montrose Railway.

== History ==
The station opened in October 1883 by the North British, Arbroath and Montrose Railway.

The station was host to a LNER camping coach from 1936 to 1939.

The station closed to both passengers and goods traffic on 22 September 1930.

Preceding station	Historical railways	Following station
Inverkeilor; Line open, station closed	North British, Arbroath and Montrose Railway	Letham Grange; Line open, station closed
