= Michael Bruce =

Michael Bruce may refer to:

- Michael Bruce (musician) (born 1948), American rock musician
- Michael Bruce (composer) (born 1983), Scottish composer and lyricist working in theatre, television and film
- Michael Bruce (entrepreneur) (born 1973), CEO of Purplebricks
- Michael Bruce (poet) (1746–1767), Scottish poet and hymnist
- Michael Bruce (MP) (1787–1861), British adventurer
- Michael Ian Bruce (born 1938), Australian chemist
- Sir Michael Bruce, 6th Baronet (died 1795), of the Bruce baronets
- Sir Michael Bruce, 7th Baronet (died 1827), of the Bruce baronets
- Sir Michael Bruce, 8th Baronet (1797–1862), of the Bruce baronets
- Sir Michael Bruce, 11th Baronet (1894–1957), author and adventurer
- Michael Bruce (minister, born 1635) (1635–1693), Scottish Presbyterian minister
- Michael Bruce (minister, born 1686) (1686–1735), Irish Presbyterian minister, son of James Bruce
- Michael Bruce, Lord Marnoch (born 1938), Scottish lawyer and judge

== See also ==
- Michael Brudenell-Bruce, 8th Marquess of Ailesbury (1926–2024)
