= Inverkeilor railway station =

Disused railway station in Inverkeilor, Angus

Inverkeilor
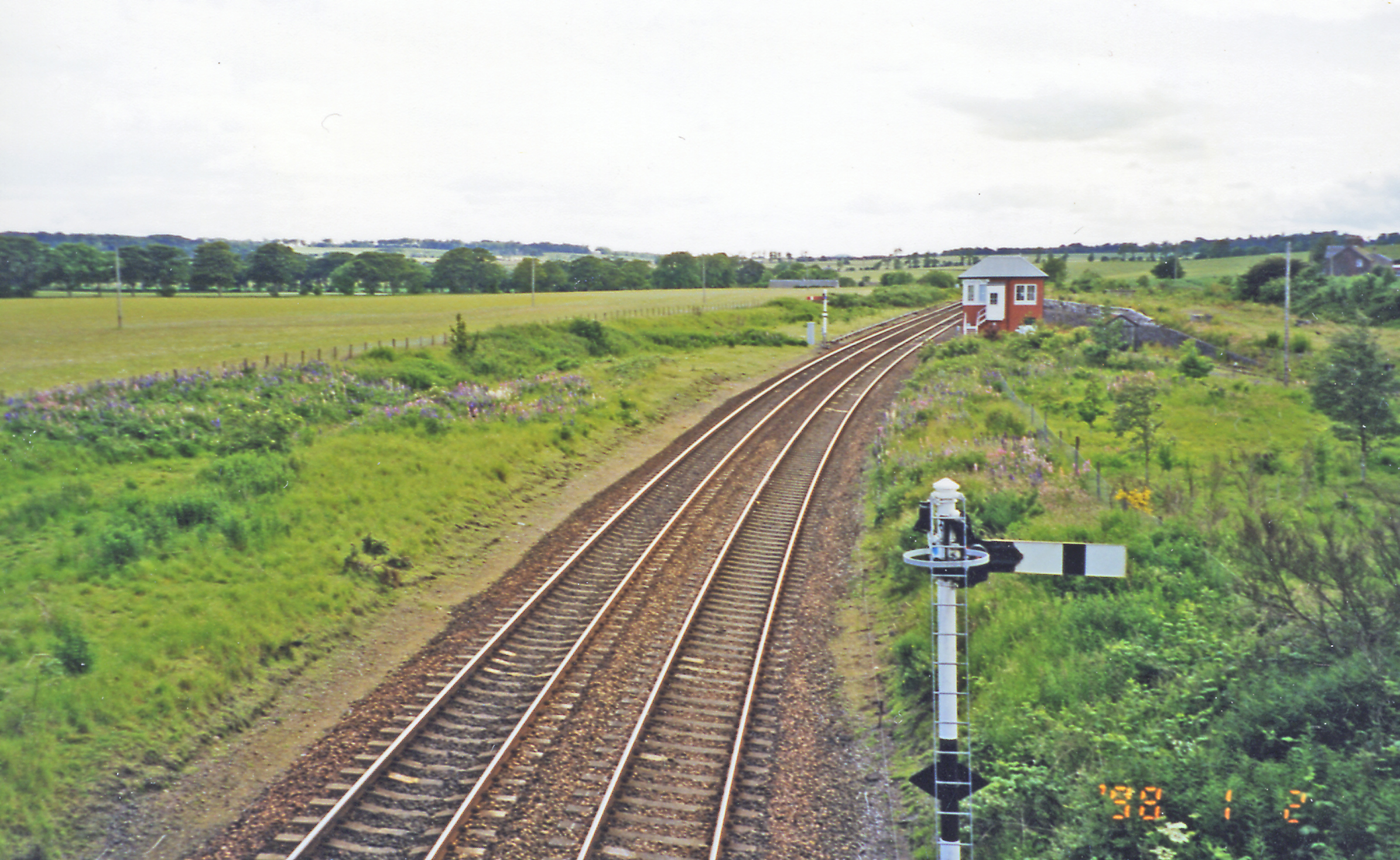
- The site of the station in 2002

General information
- Location: Inverkeilor, Angus; Scotland
- Coordinates: 56.6327°N 2.5441°W
- Grid reference: NO667491
- Platforms: 2

Other information
- Status: Disused

History
- Original company: North British, Arbroath and Montrose Railway
- Pre-grouping: North British, Arbroath and Montrose Railway; North British Railway
- Post-grouping: LNER

Key dates
- 1 May 1883: Opened
- 22 September 1930: Closed
Location

Inverkeilor railway station served the village of Inverkeilor, Angus, Scotland from 1883 to 1930 on the North British, Arbroath and Montrose Railway.

== History ==
The station was opened as Inverkeillor on 1 May 1883 by the North British, Arbroath and Montrose Railway. The line had opened for goods on 1 March but required a bridge to be rebuilt before it could be used for passenger trains. By 1896 the station had become Inverkeilor.

To the northwest was the goods yard.

The station closed to both passengers and goods traffic on 22 September 1930.

Despite being closed the station was host to a LNER camping coach from 1936 to 1939. Campers were advised to take the bus from either Arbroath or Montrose.

Preceding station	Historical railways	Following station
Lunan Bay; Line open, station closed	North British, Arbroath and Montrose Railway	Cauldcots; Line open, station closed
