= Lethem =

Lethem may refer to:

== Places ==
- Lethem, Guyana, town in Guyana
  - Lethem Airport

== Other uses ==
- Lethem (surname)

== See also ==
- Letham (disambiguation)
