= Inverkeilor =

Coordinates: 56.634321°N 2.549341°W

Inverkeilor: Scottish Gaelic: Inbhir Chìollair
- Location within Angus
- OS grid reference: NO664493
- Council area: Angus
- Lieutenancy area: Angus
- Country: Scotland
- Sovereign state: United Kingdom
- Post town: ARBROATH
- Postcode district: DD11
- Dialling code: 01241
- Police: Scotland
- Fire: Scottish
- Ambulance: Scottish
- UK Parliament: Angus
- Scottish Parliament: Angus South

Inverkeilor is a village and parish in Angus, Scotland. It lies near the North Sea coast, midway between Arbroath and Montrose. The A92 road now bypasses the village.

The population of Inverkeilor parish in the United Kingdom Census 2001 was 972, up from 902 in 1991. The population has been accommodated in recent years by the building of new houses in the village.

The parish was previously known as Conghoillis, and Watson writes that it was dedicated to a Saint Mo Chonóc of Cell Mucroisse, who may be associated with Forteviot or St Andrews, or perhaps County Wexford in Ireland.

The 12th century Red Castle built by the Barclay family is to the east of Inverkeilor, overlooking Lunan Bay. To the south-west is Ethie Castle, formerly the seat of the Earl of Northesk, which appears under the name of Knockwinnoch in Sir Walter Scott's novel The Antiquary.

Inverkeilor currently has a restaurant called Gordon's. It also has a large public park which was refurbished in 2013.

== Education ==
Inverkeilor Primary School had an enrollment of 76 pupils at the beginning of the 2005–2006 school year. Its current head teacher is Debbie Dallas. In 2002 the school underwent refurbishment and had an extension added to the main building as well solar panels put on the roof. This also resulted in the destruction of the old prefab buildings which had been in use since the 1950s.

== Public transport ==
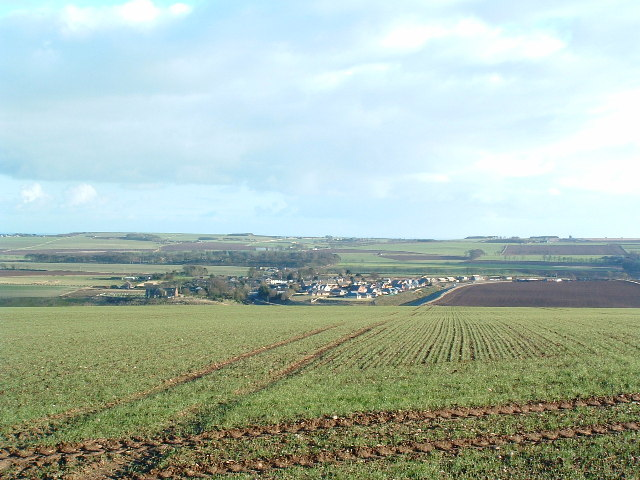
Inverkeilor

Inverkeilor railway station opened with the North British, Arbroath and Montrose Railway in 1883. The station closed in 1930 but the line remains in use and carries all services between Aberdeen and the south. Today, the village is served by the X7 bus which runs between Perth and Aberdeen, and the 30 which runs between Arbroath and Montrose, with some services extended to Hillside or Brechin and Stracathro Hospital.

== Economy ==
The Arbikie distillery and estate is located in Inverkeilor.

== Notable residents ==
- Robert Bruce, DFC (1915–2012), cellist, composer, Cardiff University music lecturer, and conscientious objector who became a highly successful navigator on RAF Mosquitoes in World War II with Canadian ace Russell Bannock.
