= Robert Bruce (Scottish composer) =

Scottish composer (1915–2012)

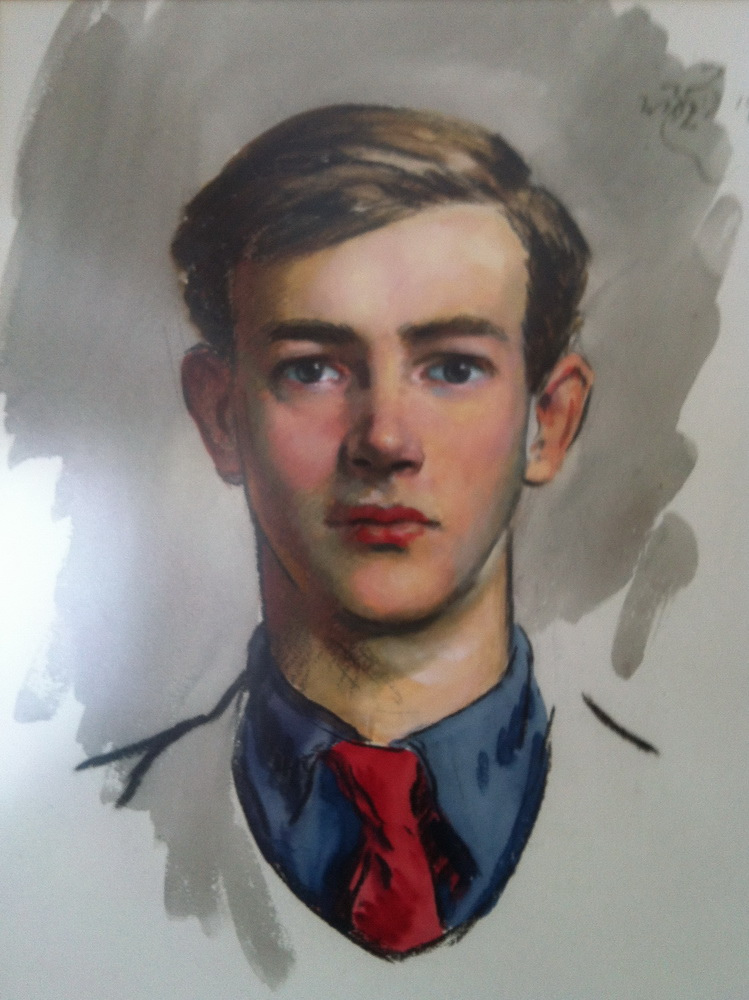
Robert Bruce, age 21, 1936, by William Bruce Ellis Ranken

Robert Richard Fernie Bruce DFC* (17 August 1915 – 13 August 2012) was a composer, lecturer and a decorated Flight Lieutenant during the WWII. He was the great grandson of James Bruce, 8th Earl of Elgin and 12th Earl of Kincardine and was born on 17 August 1915 in Inverkeilor, a village and parish in Angus, Scotland.

He was educated at Rugby School, before enrolling in 1935 at University of Edinburgh. His professor was Donald Tovey, a British musical analyst, musicologist, writer on music, composer, conductor and pianist. Bruce graduated in 1938. He then studied with Julius Röntgen, a German-Dutch composer of classical music, in Amsterdam.

At first a pacifist at the beginning of WWII, he worked with the Friends Ambulance Service during the London Blitz. Posted at Gloucester Royal Hospital, he met there his future wife, Beatrice Tomboline. After that he enlisted in the RAF as a navigator and became a Flight Lieutenant. He was paired in a night fighter crew with a Canadian pilot, Russ Bannock; their successes included the destruction of 19 V-1 flying bombs in addition to nine enemy aircraft.

In February 1945 Bruce was awarded a Bar to his Distinguished Flying Cross (United Kingdom). After leaving the RAF in 1946, he initially worked as a teacher in Brighton. He then became a lecturer in music at Cardiff University until 1977.

His major composition is the Symphony in B flat (1953–57), first performed by the Toronto Symphony Orchestra and recorded in 1999 by the Częstochowa Philharmonic Orchestra conducted by Jerzy Swoboda. Symphony in B flat is dedicated to Bannock and in part inspired by the night sorties they flew together.

After retiring in 1977, Bruce and his wife renovated a cottage at Llechryd, South Wales, where they also created and tended a beautiful one-acre garden.

His wife died in 2010, and he is survived by a son and a daughter, Katharine and James; an elder son, Richard, predeceased him in death in 2007. Robert Bruce died on 13 August 2012.
