= Thomas Bruce =

Thomas Bruce may refer to:

- Thomas Bruce, 7th Earl of Elgin (1766–1841), British nobleman and diplomat
- Thomas Bruce, 2nd Earl of Ailesbury (1656–1741), 3rd Earl of Elgin, British peer, M.P. for Marlborough, 1679–1681, and Wiltshire, 1685
- Thomas Bruce, 1st Baron of Clackmannan (died 1358/59)
- Thomas Bruce (British Army officer) (1738–1797), British member of parliament for Marlborough, 1790–1796, and Great Bedwyn, 1796–1797
- Thomas Charles Bruce (1825–1890), British member of parliament for Portsmouth, 1874–1885
- Thomas R. Bruce, co-founder of the Legal Information Institute and author of Cello, the first web browser for Microsoft Windows
- Thomas Bruce (cricketer) (born 1983), English cricketer
- Thomas Bruce, 1st Earl of Elgin (1599–1663), Scottish nobleman
- Thomas Bruce (priest) (1636–1689), Anglican priest in Ireland and archdeacon of Raphoe
- T. Berry Bruce (1919–1994), Mississippi executioner
- Tom Bruce (swimmer) (Thomas Edwin Bruce, 1952–2020), American swimmer
- Tom Bruce (rugby league) (Thomas Fraser Bruce, 1885–1917), rugby league player in Australia
- T. J. Bruce, American college baseball coach

== See also ==
- Tom Bruce (cricketer) (born 1991), New Zealand cricketer
- Thomas de Brus (c. 1284–1307), brother of Robert I of Scotland
- Tommy Bruce (1937–2006), English rock and roll singer
