= Kentucky's 9th House of Representatives district =

American legislative district

Kentucky's 9th State House of Representatives district
Representative
Myron Dossett; R–Pembroke
since January 1, 2007
- Registration: 43.1% Republican; 41.7% Democratic; 13.8% No party preference
- Demographics: 60.3% White; 17.7% Black; 12.3% Hispanic; 1.9% Asian; 0.1% Native American; 0.6% Hawaiian/Pacific Islander; 0.2% Other; 6.9% Multiracial
- Population (2023): 42,936
- Registered voters (2025): 30,505

Kentucky's 9th House of Representatives district is one of 100 districts in the Kentucky House of Representatives. Located in the western part of the state, it comprises part of Christian County. It has been represented by Myron Dossett (R–Pembroke) since 2007. As of 2023, the district had a population of 42,936.

== Voter registration ==
On January 1, 2025, the district had 30,505 registered voters, who were registered with the following parties.

Party	Registration	
Party	Voters	%
Republican	13,137	43.07
Democratic	12,735	41.75
Independent	1,646	5.40
Libertarian	352	1.15
Constitution	48	0.16
Green	28	0.09
Socialist Workers	6	0.02
Reform	4	0.01
"Other"	2,549	8.36
Total	30,505	100.00
Source: Kentucky State Board of Elections

== List of members representing the district ==
Member	Party	Years	Electoral history	District location
James E. Bruce (Hopkinsville)	Democratic	January 1, 1964 – January 1, 2007	Elected in 1963. Reelected in 1965. Reelected in 1967. Reelected in 1969. Reelected in 1971. Reelected in 1973. Reelected in 1975. Reelected in 1977. Reelected in 1979. Reelected in 1981. Reelected in 1984. Reelected in 1986. Reelected in 1988. Reelected in 1990. Reelected in 1992. Reelected in 1994. Reelected in 1996. Reelected in 1998. Reelected in 2000. Reelected in 2002. Reelected in 2004. Retired.	1964–1972; Christian County (part).
James E. Bruce (Hopkinsville)	Democratic	January 1, 1964 – January 1, 2007	Elected in 1963. Reelected in 1965. Reelected in 1967. Reelected in 1969. Reelected in 1971. Reelected in 1973. Reelected in 1975. Reelected in 1977. Reelected in 1979. Reelected in 1981. Reelected in 1984. Reelected in 1986. Reelected in 1988. Reelected in 1990. Reelected in 1992. Reelected in 1994. Reelected in 1996. Reelected in 1998. Reelected in 2000. Reelected in 2002. Reelected in 2004. Retired.	1972–1974; Christian County (part).
James E. Bruce (Hopkinsville)	Democratic	January 1, 1964 – January 1, 2007	Elected in 1963. Reelected in 1965. Reelected in 1967. Reelected in 1969. Reelected in 1971. Reelected in 1973. Reelected in 1975. Reelected in 1977. Reelected in 1979. Reelected in 1981. Reelected in 1984. Reelected in 1986. Reelected in 1988. Reelected in 1990. Reelected in 1992. Reelected in 1994. Reelected in 1996. Reelected in 1998. Reelected in 2000. Reelected in 2002. Reelected in 2004. Retired.	1974–1985; Christian (part) and Hopkins (part) Counties.
James E. Bruce (Hopkinsville)	Democratic	January 1, 1964 – January 1, 2007	Elected in 1963. Reelected in 1965. Reelected in 1967. Reelected in 1969. Reelected in 1971. Reelected in 1973. Reelected in 1975. Reelected in 1977. Reelected in 1979. Reelected in 1981. Reelected in 1984. Reelected in 1986. Reelected in 1988. Reelected in 1990. Reelected in 1992. Reelected in 1994. Reelected in 1996. Reelected in 1998. Reelected in 2000. Reelected in 2002. Reelected in 2004. Retired.	1985–1993; Christian County (part).
James E. Bruce (Hopkinsville)	Democratic	January 1, 1964 – January 1, 2007	Elected in 1963. Reelected in 1965. Reelected in 1967. Reelected in 1969. Reelected in 1971. Reelected in 1973. Reelected in 1975. Reelected in 1977. Reelected in 1979. Reelected in 1981. Reelected in 1984. Reelected in 1986. Reelected in 1988. Reelected in 1990. Reelected in 1992. Reelected in 1994. Reelected in 1996. Reelected in 1998. Reelected in 2000. Reelected in 2002. Reelected in 2004. Retired.	1993–1997; Christian (part) and Hopkins (part) Counties.
James E. Bruce (Hopkinsville)	Democratic	January 1, 1964 – January 1, 2007	Elected in 1963. Reelected in 1965. Reelected in 1967. Reelected in 1969. Reelected in 1971. Reelected in 1973. Reelected in 1975. Reelected in 1977. Reelected in 1979. Reelected in 1981. Reelected in 1984. Reelected in 1986. Reelected in 1988. Reelected in 1990. Reelected in 1992. Reelected in 1994. Reelected in 1996. Reelected in 1998. Reelected in 2000. Reelected in 2002. Reelected in 2004. Retired.	1997–2003
James E. Bruce (Hopkinsville)	Democratic	January 1, 1964 – January 1, 2007	Elected in 1963. Reelected in 1965. Reelected in 1967. Reelected in 1969. Reelected in 1971. Reelected in 1973. Reelected in 1975. Reelected in 1977. Reelected in 1979. Reelected in 1981. Reelected in 1984. Reelected in 1986. Reelected in 1988. Reelected in 1990. Reelected in 1992. Reelected in 1994. Reelected in 1996. Reelected in 1998. Reelected in 2000. Reelected in 2002. Reelected in 2004. Retired.	2003–2015
Myron Dossett (Pembroke)	Republican	January 1, 2007 – present	Elected in 2006. Reelected in 2008. Reelected in 2010. Reelected in 2012. Reelected in 2014. Reelected in 2016. Reelected in 2018. Reelected in 2020. Reelected in 2022. Reelected in 2024. Reelected in 2026.	2003–2015
Myron Dossett (Pembroke)	Republican	January 1, 2007 – present	Elected in 2006. Reelected in 2008. Reelected in 2010. Reelected in 2012. Reelected in 2014. Reelected in 2016. Reelected in 2018. Reelected in 2020. Reelected in 2022. Reelected in 2024. Reelected in 2026.	2015–2023
Myron Dossett (Pembroke)	Republican	January 1, 2007 – present	Elected in 2006. Reelected in 2008. Reelected in 2010. Reelected in 2012. Reelected in 2014. Reelected in 2016. Reelected in 2018. Reelected in 2020. Reelected in 2022. Reelected in 2024. Reelected in 2026.	2023–present
