= Myron Dossett =

American politician

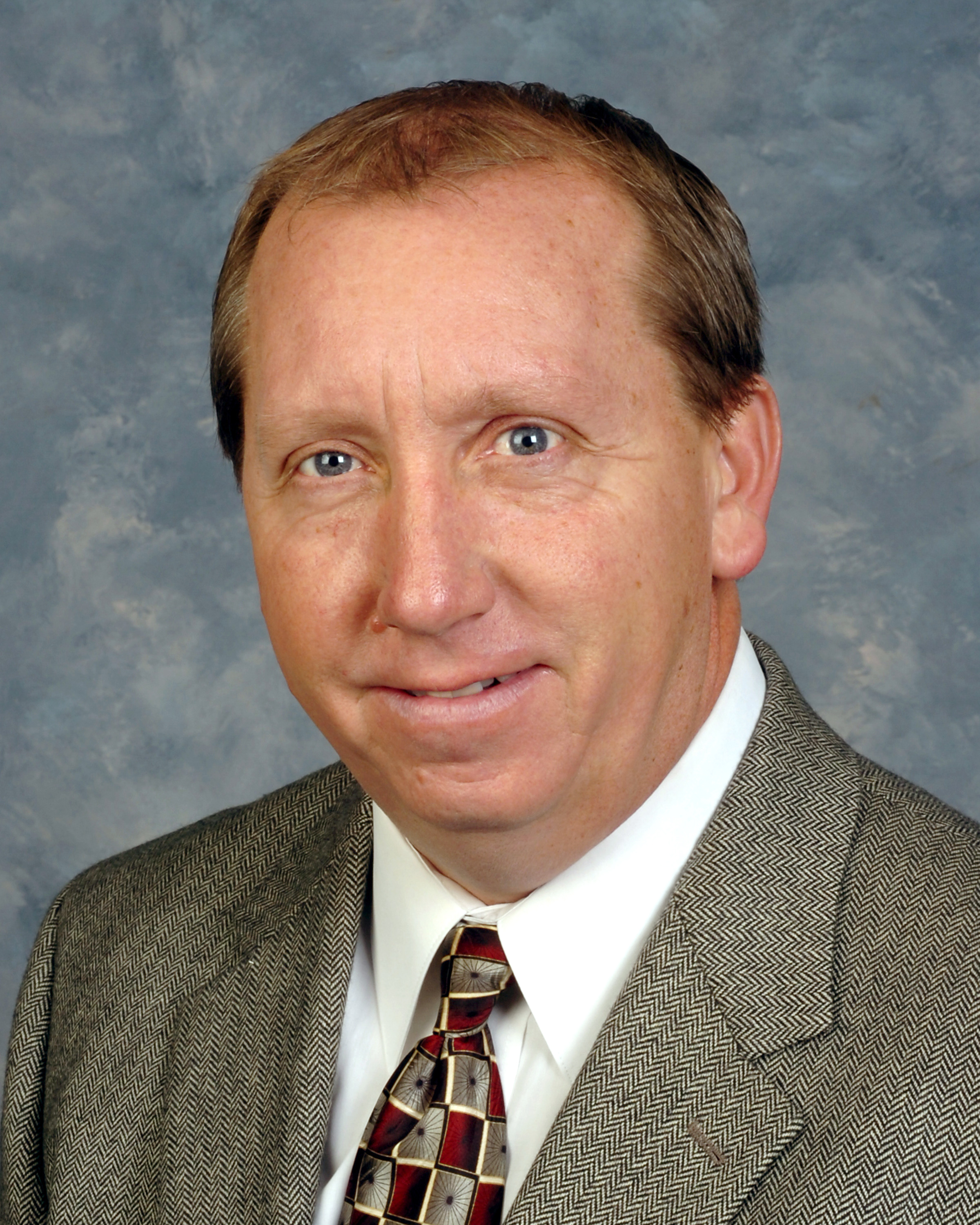
- Official portrait, 2006

Member of the Kentucky House of Representatives from the 9th district
- Incumbent
- Assumed office January 1, 2007
- Preceded by: James E. Bruce

Personal details
- Born: January 9, 1961 (age 65) Christian County, Kentucky
- Party: Republican
- Committees: Agriculture (Chair); Natural Resources and Energy; Transportation; Veterans, Military Affairs, and Public Protection

Myron Blane Dossett (born January 9, 1961) is an American politician who has served as a Republican member of the Kentucky House of Representatives since January 2007. He represents Kentucky's 9th House district, which includes part of Christian County.

== Biography ==
Dossett was born in Christian County. For a short time after graduating high school, he attended Murray State University.

Prior to being elected to the Kentucky House of Representatives, Dossett served as a magistrate on the Christian County Fiscal Court. Currently, he owns D's Auto Detailing, Clark and Dossett Rentals, and is a member of the Pembroke Ruritan Club.

== Political career ==
=== Leadership ===
Dossett served as the long-time co-chair of the Tobacco Settlement Agreement Fund Oversight Committee, which was formed in 2018 following the first distribution of funds to Kentucky as a result of the Tobacco Master Settlement Agreement.

Dossett served in this role until he was named as the new chair of the House Standing Committee on Agriculture during the 2025 Kentucky General Assembly.

=== Elections ===
- 2006 Kentucky's 9th House district incumbent James E. Bruce chose not to seek reelection. Dossett was unopposed in the 2006 Republican Primary and won the 2006 Kentucky House of Representatives election with 2,759 votes (53.5%) against Democratic nominee Peter MacDonald.
- 2008 Dossett was unopposed in the 2008 Republican Primary, and won the 2008 Kentucky House of Representatives election with 5,050 votes (58.3%) against Democratic nominee Travis Calhoun, who had run in the 2006 Democratic Primary.
- 2010 Dossett was unopposed for both the 2010 Republican Primary and the 2010 Kentucky House of Representatives election, winning the latter with 4,333 votes.
- 2012 Dossett was unopposed for both the 2012 Republican Primary, and the 2012 Kentucky House of Representatives election, winning the latter with 6,670 votes.
- 2014 Dossett was unopposed for both the 2014 Republican Primary, and the 2014 Kentucky House of Representatives election, winning the latter with 7,770 votes.
- 2016 Dossett was unopposed for both the 2016 Republican Primary, and the 2016 Kentucky House of Representatives election, winning with 11,425 votes.
- 2018 Dossett was unopposed in the 2018 Republican Primary, and won the 2018 Kentucky House of Representatives election against Democratic nominee William Coleman, winning with 7,795 votes.
- 2020 Dossett was unopposed for both the 2020 Republican Primary, and the 2020 Kentucky House of Representatives election, winning with 13,244.
- 2022 Dossett was unopposed in the 2022 Republican Primary, and won the 2022 Kentucky House of Representatives election against Democratic nominee Bianca Crockam, winning with 5,123 votes.
- 2024 Dossett was unopposed in the 2024 Republican Primary, and won 2024 Kentucky House of Representatives election with 7,124 votes (67.4%) against Democratic nominee Twyla Dillard.
