= George Brudenell =

George Brudenell may refer to:

- George Brudenell, 3rd Earl of Cardigan (1685–1732), Earl of Cardigan
- George Brudenell, 4th Earl of Cardigan (1712–1790)
- George Bridges Brudenell (1726–1801), British politician

== See also ==
- George Brudenell-Bruce (disambiguation)
- Brudenell (disambiguation)
