= Judge Bruce =

Judge Bruce may refer to:

- Colin S. Bruce (born 1965), judge of the United States District Court for the Central District of Illinois
- J. Gregory Bruce (1897–1985), judge of the United States Tax Court
- John Bruce (judge) (1832–1901), judge of the United States District Courts for the Northern, Middle, and Southern Districts of Alabama

== See also ==
- James Knight-Bruce (1791–1866), judge of the Court of Appeal in Chancery
