= David Bruce =

David Bruce may refer to:

== Entertainment ==
- David Bruce (actor) (1914–1976), American film actor
- David Bruce (composer) (born 1970), British composer
- David Bruce (bridge) (1900–1965), American contract bridge player in the 1930s

== Science ==
- David Bruce (physician) (fl. 1660s), Scottish physician
- David Bruce (microbiologist) (1855–1931), Scottish pathologist and microbiologist
- David Bruce (naturalist) (1833–1903), Scottish-American natural history collector

== Other ==
- David II of Scotland (1324–1371), David Bruce, King of Scots, son of King Robert the Bruce
- David Bruce (captain) (1816–1903), British master mariner
- David Bruce (minister) (1824–1911), Presbyterian minister, journalist
- David K. E. Bruce (1898–1977), American diplomat
- David Bruce (brewer) (born 1948), British entrepreneur, founder of the Firkin Brewery pub chain
- David Bruce (ice hockey) (born 1964), Canadian National Hockey League player
- David Bruce (inventor) (1802–1892), American industrialist and inventor

== See also ==
- Bruce LM–5000 Pairs, an American contract bridge competition
- David Bruce Winery, an American winery
- David Bryce (1803–1876), Scottish architect
