= Robert the Bruce (wargame) =

1978 board wargame

- Designers: Kenneth Clark
- Publishers: Fusilier Games
- Publication: 1978
- Genres: Medieval

Robert the Bruce is a board wargame published by Scottish game publisher Fusilier Games in 1977 that simulates the Scottish Wars of Independence in the 13th and 14 centuries.

== Background ==
In 1296, England invaded Scotland, beginning the First War (1296–1328) that ended with the signing of the Treaty of Edinburgh–Northampton in 1328. The Second War (1332–1357) began with the English-supported invasion by Edward Balliol and the "Disinherited" in 1332 and ended in 1357 with the signing of the Treaty of Berwick.

== Description ==
Robert the Bruce is a board wargame for 2–5 players in which each player controls a Scottish controls a leader and a group of fighting men and tries to become the King of Scotland. The 20" 22" mounted hex grid map covers Scotland, northern England,and Ulster. Critic Charles Vasey criticized the map, noting that the hex grid had simply been superimposed on the map without regard to terrain, nor had the terrain been adjusted for the hex grid, pointing out "One may not cross firths ... without ships, but in many hexes part of two bodies of land [separated by water] are in one hex."

The map is divided into districts such as the Highlands, Lordship of the Isles, Galloway, and Badenoch. Burghs (towns) form separate areas within a district. Each district or burgh produces different types of leaders, soldiers and followers. For example, the Lordship of the Isles has The MacDonald and his personal galloglas, another three galloglas and a naval fleet. Galloway starts with the Balliol Lord and his knights, clansmen militia, clansmen mobile units and the McDowell galloglas.

Players can attempt to convince neutral districts and burghs to join their cause; if a district or burgh is already allied with another faction, another player can invade the district or besiege the burgh in an attempt to wrest control of it away.

Each turn covers one season, and a game lasts a maximum of 16 turns. (Critic Jon Freeman noted that the average length of a game was 15 to 20 hours, unless the players set a shorter turn limit.). Combat occurs when a unit enters a hex already occupied by an enemy unit, although a non-active player can intercept an enemy unit before it enters their hex. If castles or burghs are besieged, the siege is successful on a die roll of 1, 2, or 3.

Any player may attempt to ally with English forces, but will only succeed on the roll of a die, after which the English forces will enter Scotland on their behalf. Another roll of the die may see them unilaterally withdraw to England.

Special rules cover William Wallace, St Andrews, the Coronation, invading Ireland, and control of the highlands by William of Ross.

The first person to defeat all other players and become King of Scotland within a four-year period (16 turns) is the winner.

=== Scenarios ===
The game come with five scenarios:

1. Bruce versus Balliol
2. Bruce versus Balliol, with neutral lords
3. English invasion
4. Inter-clan warfare between the Ross factions
5. The Stewarts versus other clans

== Publication history ==
In 1977, a games group in Aberdeen, Scotland founded Fusilier Games to publish the wargames they had developed for play among themselves. The first four, Wehrmacht (1977), Sadowa (1977), Warsaw Rising (1977), and Battle for Rome: Anzio-Cassino 1944 (1978), were all mimeographed ziplock bag games featuring amateurish production values. The company upgraded the production values for Robert the Bruce, designed by Kenneth Clark, which was released in 1978 as a boxed set featuring a mounted full-colour map. However, this was to be Fusilier's final publication.

== Reception ==
In the 1980 book The Complete Book of Wargames, game designer Jon Freeman called this "An interesting game on an esoteric subject." Freeman noted that the rulebook contained a great deal of well-researched history "on both the events and the history." Freeman pointed out the rules "have some holes, especially in the terrain department. Freeman gave this game an Overall Evaluation of "Good", concluding, "Involved players can enjoy an entertaining evening with it."

In Issue 28 of the British wargaming magazine Perfidious Albion, Charles Vasey also noted the "excellent (and remarkably unbiased) historical notes." However, Vasey had issues with many of the rules, commenting, "One gets the impression at these rules were never blind tested, they read like first drafts, that is, very deep in places with almost ludicrously little detail elsewhere... the rules are too flaccid and need a bit of legalese." Despite this, Vasey found the game "quite good fun with armies marching about trying to drum up allies and squash opponents." Vasey concluded, "The game is exciting and fairly accurate ... certainly very evocative of the period ... When embroiled in the rules, you may regret more time was not spent on the rules and less on the [historical] notes."

== Reviews ==
- Perfidious Albion #35 (January 1979) p.6-7
