= Letham Grange estate =

Mansion in Angus, Scotland

Coordinates: 56°36′06″N 2°36′47″W

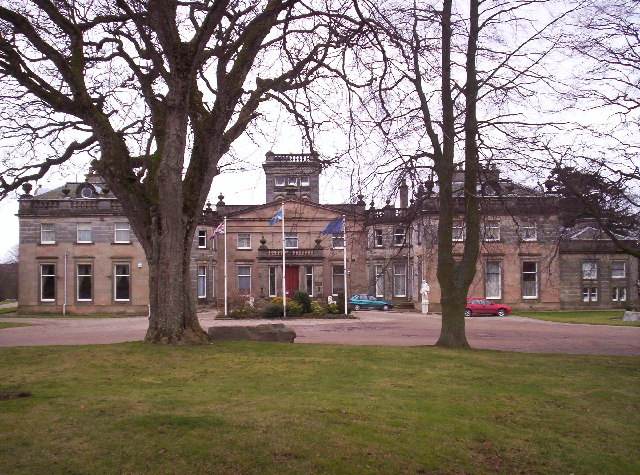
Letham Grange Hotel in 2006

Letham Grange is a mansion and estate situated north of Arbroath, in Angus, Scotland. The mansion itself is category B listed.

== History ==
The mansion was constructed between 1827 and 1830. The architect was Archibald Simpson. During the late 20th century, the mansion was converted into a hotel and private houses were built on the estate.

The estate had its own railway station, Letham Grange railway station, on the North British, Arbroath and Montrose Railway.

A golf club on the estate was opened in 1987, the official opening attended by Henry Cotton. The estate was acquired by Taiwanese man Peter Liu. The hotel closed in 2002, and the golf club folded in November 2019. The site has also been home to a curling club.
