= Letham Grange railway station =

Disused railway station in Arbroath, Angus

Letham Grange
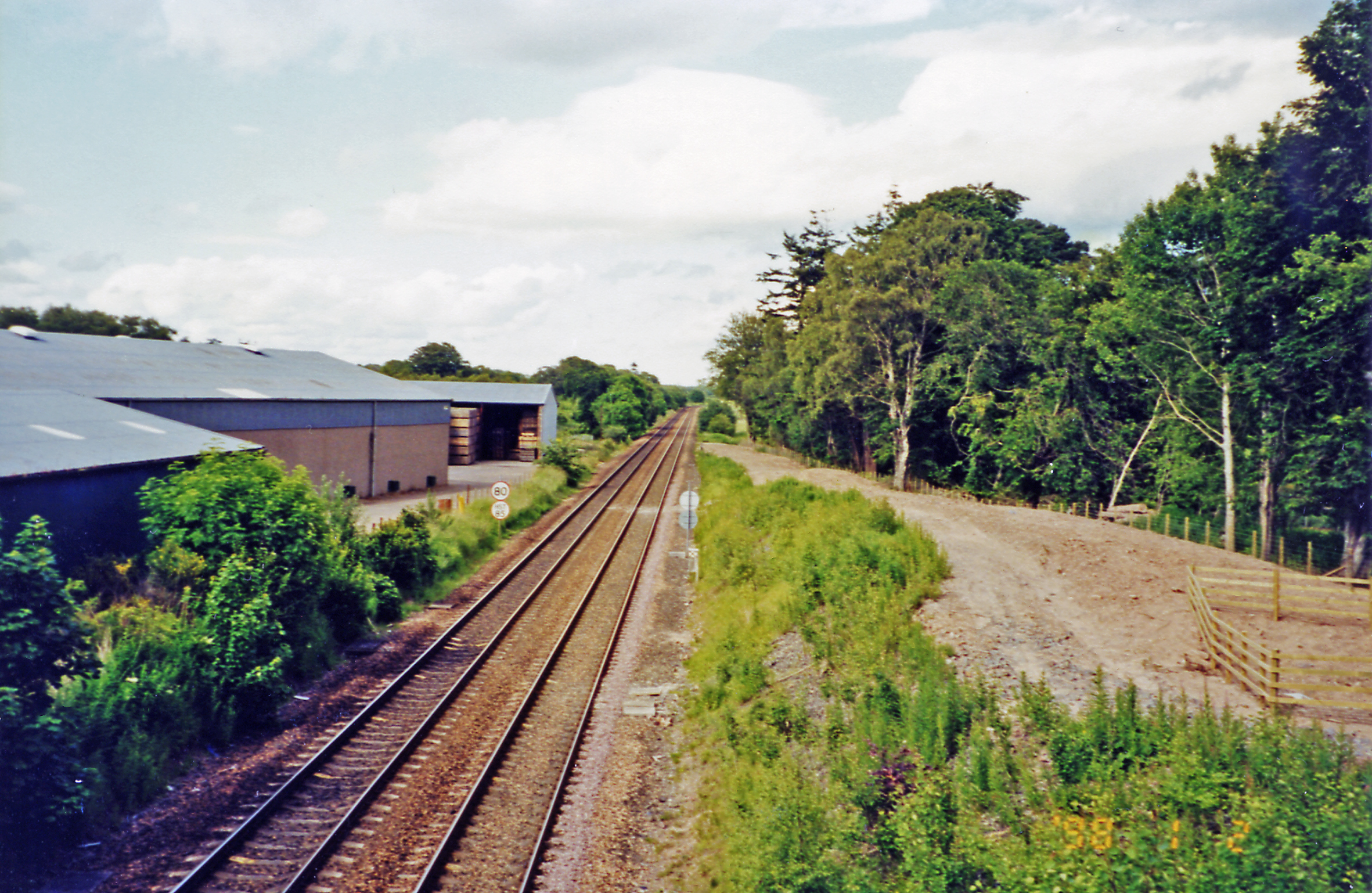
- The site of the station in 2002

General information
- Location: Arbroath, Angus; Scotland
- Coordinates: 56.598982°N 2.596467°W
- Grid reference: NO634454
- Platforms: 2

Other information
- Status: Disused

History
- Original company: North British, Arbroath and Montrose Railway
- Pre-grouping: North British, Arbroath and Montrose Railway; North British Railway
- Post-grouping: LNER

Key dates
- 1 May 1883: Opened
- 22 September 1930: Closed to passengers
- 1 July 1959: Closed completely
Location

Letham Grange railway station served the Letham Grange estate, Angus, Scotland from 1883 to 1959 on the North British, Arbroath and Montrose Railway.

== History ==
The station opened on 1 May 1883 by the North British, Arbroath and Montrose Railway. The station was expanded with the doubling of the line in the 1890s. The goods yard was situated to the west. The station closed to both passengers on 22 September 1930 and to goods traffic on 1 July 1959.

Preceding station	Historical railways	Following station
Cauldcots; Line open, station closed	North British, Arbroath and Montrose Railway	Arbroath; Line open, station open
