= Edward Bruce (disambiguation) =

Edward Bruce (c. 1280–1318), was the brother of King Robert I of Scotland.

Edward Bruce may also refer to:

- Edward Bruce, 10th Earl of Elgin (1881–1968)
- Edward Bruce, 1st Lord Kinloss (1548–1611), Scottish lawyer and judge
- Edward Bruce (New Deal) (1879–1943), American art administrator during the New Deal relief efforts
- Edward Brice (cricketer) (1840–1918), English cricketer who from 1875 onwards was known as Edward Bruce
- Edward Bruce (archer) (1861–1919), American archer
- Edward Bruce (music executive) (born 1997), British executive music producer

== See also ==
- Ed Bruce (1939–2021), American country music songwriter
