= Arbikie distillery =

Distillery in Scotland

Arbikie Distillery

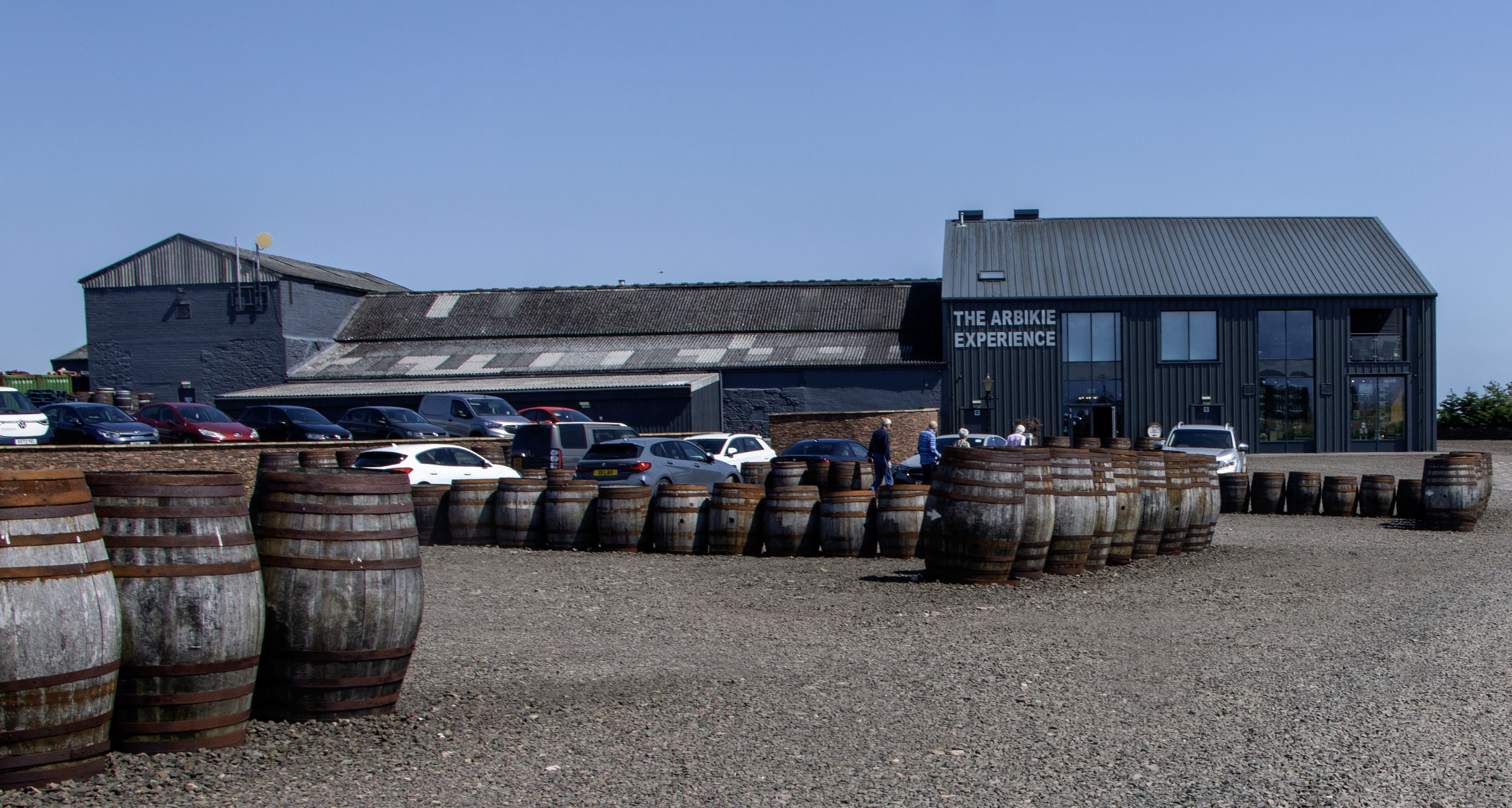

Region: Highland
- Location: Inverkeilor
- Coordinates: 56.665607°N 2.527366°W
- Owner: Stirling family
- Founded: 2013
- No. of stills: 1 wash still; 1 spirit still
- Capacity: 200,000 litres
- Website: arbikie.com

Arbikie Distillery, is a scotch whisky, vodka and gin distillery in Inverkeilor, Angus, Scotland.

== History ==
The distillery was built in 2013 on the Arbikie Highland Estate, a 2,000 acre farm owned by the Stirling family for four generations. There are earlier records of whisky production on the estate that date to 1794. The distillery is owned by Stirling brothers John, Iain and David.

Production uses barley and potatoes from the estate farm. Overall, it is stated that 90% of all raw materials in the production process come from the farm.

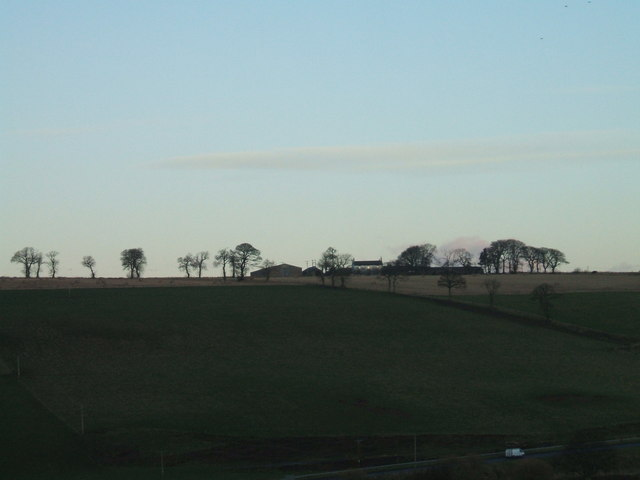
Arbikie Hill located south-west of the distillery

In August 2021, the distillery began an agreement with the company EcoSpirits for distribution, to reduce the carbon emissions associated with packaging and distribution.

In December 2021, the distillery was granted £3 million through the Green Distilleries Competition to create a new hydrogen power plant at the distillery.

A new experience visitor centre opened in May 2022.

== Products ==
The distillery uses pot and column stills from CARL of Germany to produce whisky, gin and vodka.

The core gin expression is named 'Kirsty's Gin' after master distiller Kirsty Black and includes botanicals such as seaweed, carline thistle and Scottish blaeberry.

The distillery also produce a gin called Nàdar (nature) which is branded as climate positive in terms of environmental production. Unusually, the gin uses peas instead of wheat in production.

In 2014, the distillery produced Scotland's first commercial potato vodka. The vodka uses a blend of Maris Piper, King Edwards and Cultra potatoes.

In 2020, the distillery released a Highland rye whisky. On release, this was the first commercial rye whisky produced for more than 100 years in Scotland.
