= Robert Bruce (merchant adventurer) =

Robert Bruce of Clackmannan was the son of Sir James Bruce and a direct descendant of Sir Thomas Bruce, 1st Baron of Clackmannan. Robert Bruce was a successful trader and he immigrated to the British Gold Coast in 1745. Bruce resided in the Ga city of Jamestown, Ghana.

== Background ==
Robert Bruce was an elder son of Sir James Bruce and an unknown mother in 1715. His father left to establish a plantation in Barbados and later on married Keturah French.

== Descendants ==
- King Bruce- Ghanaian singer

== Sources ==
- Mayor, A. (2005). Soziale Sicherheit und Entwicklung. Lit. p. 238. ISBN 9783825890315.
- House of Bruce
- Robert W. July, An African Voice: The Role of the Humanities in African Independence, Duke University press, 1987, p. 132.
- Robert W. July, The Origins of Modern African Thought: Its Development in West Africa During the Nineteenth and Twentieth Centuries (1967), Africa World Press, 2004, p. 258.
- Seth Quartey, Carl Christian Reindorf: Colonial Subjectivity and Drawn Boundaries.
- Annual Bibliography of British and Irish History, Oxford University Press, 1999.
