= Samuel B. Sterrett =

American judge (1922–2013)

Personal details
- Born: Samuel Black Sterrett; December 17, 1922 Washington, D.C., U.S.
- Died: September 8, 2013 (aged 90) Bethesda, Maryland, U.S.
- Spouse: Jeane McBride
- Children: 3
- Education: Amherst College; University of Virginia; New York University

Military service
- Branch/service: United States Army
- Years of service: 1943–1946

Samuel Black Sterrett (December 17, 1922 – September 8, 2013) was a judge of the United States Tax Court from 1968 to 1988.

== Early life and education ==
Sterrett was born in Washington, D.C., and received his early education at St. Albans School. Later, he attended Amherst College in 1947 and the University of Virginia School of Law in 1950. He graduated from New York University School of Law with a Master of Laws in Taxation in 1959. He was admitted to the Virginia bar in 1950 and the District of Columbia bar in 1951.

== Career ==
Sterrett served in the Army in 1943 and the U.S. Merchant Marine from 1943 to 1946, where he graduated from the United States Merchant Marine Academy and sailed as a second mate in the Atlantic and Pacific Oceans. Sterrett worked for the law firm of Alvord & Alvord from 1950 to 1955, as a special attorney in the New York office of the Internal Revenue Service from 1956 to 1960, and at Sullivan, Shea & Kenney from 1960 to 1968.

Sterrett was a municipal consultant to the Office of the Vice President from 1966 to 1968. He served on the Chevy Chase Village Board of Managers from 1970 to 1974, including as chairman from 1972 to 1974.

Sterrett was appointed to the United States Tax Court on October 21, 1968, succeeding Judge J. Gregory Bruce, and was reappointed on May 21, 1970, for a term expiring on June 1, 1985. He serve as chief judge in 1985 and again in 1987.

== Personal life and death ==
Sterrett married Jeane McBride, with whom he celebrated 64 years of marriage before his death, and with whom he had two sons and a daughter.

He died at Suburban Hospital in Bethesda, Maryland, shortly after returning from his summer residence in Lake Placid, New York, at the age of 90.
