= General Bruce =

General Bruce may refer to:

- Alexander Romanovich Bruce (1704–1760), Imperial Russian Army lieutenant general
- Andrew Davis Bruce (1894–1969), U.S. Army lieutenant general
- Bob Bruce (British Army officer) (fl. 1980s–2020s), British Army major general
- Charles Granville Bruce (1866–1939), British Indian Army brigadier general
- Geoffrey Bruce (Indian Army officer) (1896–1972), British Indian Army major general
- Jacob Bruce (1669–1735), Russian Army major general of artillery
- James Bruce (1732–1791) (1732–1791), Imperial Russian Army general
- Robert Bruce (British Army officer, born 1813), British Army major general
- Robert Bruce (British Army officer, born 1821), British Army general
- Robert Bruce (1668–1720), Imperial Russian Army lieutenant general
- Thomas Bruce (British Army officer) (1738–1797), British Army lieutenant general
