= John Bruce =

John Bruce may refer to:

- Sir John Bruce, 2nd Baronet (before 1671–1711), Commissioner to the Parliament of Scotland; MP
- John Bruce (historiographer) (1745–1826), Scottish politician, East India Company historiographer and Secretary to the Board of Control
- John Bruce (minister) (1794–1880), senior Scottish minister of both the Church of Scotland and Free Church of Scotland
- John Bruce (antiquary) (1802–1869), English founder of the Camden Society
- John Bruce (British Army officer) (1808–1870), acting Governor of Western Australia
- John Bruce (judge) (1832–1901), U.S. federal judge
- John Bruce (Canada) (1837–1893), first president of the Métis provisional government
- John Bruce (barrister) (1861–1921), Scottish barrister and briefly MP for Greenock in 1892
- John Bruce (surgeon) (1905–1975), Scottish surgeon
- John Asamoah Bruce, Ghanaian air force officer
- John Collingwood Bruce (1805–1892), English nonconformist minister and historian
- John E. Bruce (1856–1924), American lawyer, politician, and baseball executive
- John Edward Bruce (1856–1924), African American slave, writer and nationalist leader
- John Mitchell Bruce (1846–1929), British physician
- John Munro Bruce (1840–1901), Australian businessman
- John Leck Bruce (1850–1921), Scottish-born architect and sanitary engineer
- John Gregory Bruce (1897–1985), United States Tax Court judge

== See also ==
- John Bruce-Gardyne (1930–1990), Baron; Conservative MP for Angus, Scotland
- John Bruce Glasier (1859–1920), British Independent Labour Party politician
- John Bruce Thompson (born 1951), American attorney and anti-game advocate
- Jack Bruce (1943–2014), Scottish musician, composer and vocalist
