= Charles Bruce =

Charles Bruce may refer to:

- Charles Bruce, 3rd Earl of Ailesbury (1682–1747), British peer
- Charles Bruce, 5th Earl of Elgin (1732–1771)
- Charles Bruce (governor) (1836–1920), British colonial administrator
- Charles Bruce (mayor) (1862–1937), Canadian-born American politician
- Charles Bruce (physicist) (1902–1979), Scottish astrophysicist
- Charles Alexander Bruce (1793–1871), soldier, explorer and author
- Charles Andrew Bruce (1768–1810), Governor of Prince of Wales Island
- Charles Cumming-Bruce (1790–1875), Scottish politician
- Charles Edward Bruce (1876–1950), administrator in British India
- Charles Granville Bruce (1866–1939), British mountaineer
- Charles Morelle Bruce (1853–1938), American politician and businessman
- Nish Bruce (Charles Christian Cameron Bruce, 1956–2002), British soldier and author
- Charles Tory Bruce (1906–1971), Canadian newspaperman and poet
- Lord Charles Bruce (1834–1897), British soldier and politician
- Charles Bruce, pseudonym of Fanny Crosby (1820–1915), English poet

== See also ==
- Charles Brudenell-Bruce, 1st Marquess of Ailesbury (1773–1856), British peer and politician
