= Susan Spaull =

Susan Spaull is a cookery writer, teacher and chef. She trained at Leiths School of Food and Wine in London and went on to become one of their senior teachers. She has written several cookery books for Leiths including Leiths Techniques Bible which won a Gourmand World Cookbook Award for the "Best Book in the World for Food Professionals" in 2003. She also does food photography, demonstrations and recipe development.

== Books ==
=== Ideal Home Entertaining ===
- Published in 1999 by Boxtree. ISBN 0-7522-1750-X

=== Leiths Techniques Bible ===
Co-authored with Lucinda Bruce-Gardyne

- Published in 2003 by Bloomsbury. ISBN 0-7475-6046-3

The book has won two major awards since publication:

- "Best Book in the World for Food Professionals", Gourmand Book Awards, 2003.
- Top 10 "The Most Useful Cookery Books Ever", Waitrose Food Illustrated, 2005.

=== Leiths Baking Bible ===
Co-authored with Fiona Burrell Won Gourmand Award for Best UK Baking Book 2006

- Published in 2006 by Bloomsbury. ISBN 0-7475-8189-4

=== Edited Leiths Cookery Bible ===
- Prue Leith; Caroline Waldegrave. Published in 2003 by Bloomsbury. ISBN 0-7475-6602-X

=== "Leiths Meat Bible" ===
- Co-authored with Max Clark. Published in 2010 by Bloomsbury. ISBN 978-0-7475-9047-7
