= Typecasting (disambiguation) =

Typecasting is the process by which an actor is strongly identified with a specific character, role, or trait.

Typecast, typecasting, or type casting may also refer to:

- Type casting (computer programming), the act or result of changing an entity of one data type into another
- Type casting (typography), a technique for casting individual letters for use in printing presses
- Typecast (band), a Filipino band
- Typecast (horse), an American racehorse

== See also ==
- Stereotyping, similar to the acting concept
