= Ingrid Bruce =

Swedish civil engineer (1940–2012)

Ingrid Monica Bruce
- Born: 29 April 1940; Säffle, Sweden
- Died: 17 November 2012 (aged 72); Stockholm
- Education: Chalmers Technical College
- Occupation: Engineer
- Spouse: Gerhard Raunio
- Parents: Karl Georg Bruce (father); Ellen Ingrid Hederén (mother)

Ingrid Monica Bruce (29 April 1940 – 17 November 2012) was a Swedish engineer who is remembered for her contributions to the Swedish defence sector, in particular for coordinating the development of the surface-to-air missile system known as BAMSE in the 1990s. Bruce was the first woman to chair the trade union Swedish Association of Graduate Engineers (CF), in the 1980s, while in the 1990s she headed the Swedish committee under the European organization of civil engineers European Federation of National Engineering Associations (FEANI).

== Early life and education ==
Born and raised in Säffle, Ingrid Monica Bruce was the daughter of the engineer Karl Georg Bruce (1911–1999) and Ellen Ingrid née Hederén (1908–2006). The second of the family's seven children, she graduated from high school in 1958. Following in her father's footsteps, she was one of only three women when she started studying in the electronics department of Chalmers Technical College in Gothenburg. She graduated with her master's degree in engineering in 1964 and moved to Stockholm.

== Career ==
In 1968, Bruce was employed by the Royal Swedish Air Force Administration where she worked on robotic guidance. The following year she moved to the consultancy TUAB where she was involved in navigation technology until she moved back to the Air Force in 1993. There she became project leader of the BAMSE surface-to-air missile system. She was promoted to head the weapons centre in 1998 where she served until her retirement in 2003.

On the trade union front, while at TUAB she was elected deputy in the local union Swedish Association of Graduate Engineers (CF). In 1975, she became a member of the CF commission for the labour market. After becoming a board member in 1982, she became CF's chair from 1985 to 1989, the first woman to do so. While there, she met Gerhard Raunio, also an engineer and board member; they married in 1991. Through her union activities, she strove to encourage women to gain qualifications in science and technology.

From 1985, she was active in European Federation of National Engineering Associations (FEANI), the European organisation for engineers. In addition to the heading the Swedish committee, she was the organisation's vice-president from 1991 to 1994.

Ingrid Bruce died on 17 November 2012 and is buried in Stockholm.
