= James E. Bruce =

American politician

Member of the Kentucky House of Representatives from the 9th district
- In office January 1, 1964 – January 1, 2007
- Preceded by: John M. Dixon
- Succeeded by: Myron Dossett

Personal details
- Born: August 17, 1927 Morristown, Tennessee
- Died: November 2, 2008 (aged 81) Hopkinsville, Kentucky
- Party: Democratic
- Education: University of Tennessee
- Profession: dairy farmer

James Edmond Bruce Sr. (August 17, 1927 – November 2, 2008) was a politician in the American state of Kentucky.

Bruce was the son of William Witt and Mossie (née Sharpe) Bruce, having been born in Morristown, Tennessee. In his early years, he attended the University of Tennessee and helped his father on the family's dairy farm. After the family sold the farm in 1940, they relocated to Christian County, Kentucky where they maintained another farm, and upon his father's death in 1975, James assumed operations of it.

He was elected to the Kentucky House of Representatives in 1963 as a Democrat, representing the 9th electoral district. Among the many committees he served on was the Banking and Insurance Committee, which he chaired. Upon his exit from the house in 2007, he was the longest-served state representative in the history of Kentucky. Upon his retirement in 2006 he was honored in the United States House of Representatives by Rep. Ed Whitfield. He was succeeded by Republican Myron Dossett.

He married Jane Forbes Garnett in 1952 and had three children. They lived in Hopkinsville. The James E. Bruce Convention Center in Hopkinsville is named in his honor. In 2006, Bruce was hospitalized due to the effects of chronic inflammatory demyelinating polyradiculoneuropathy, which he had been suffering from for a year. He died at the age of 81 at his home, of natural causes, in 2008.
