= T. Berry Bruce =

American executioner

Thomas Berry Bruce
- Born: August 16, 1919
- Died: October 12, 1994 (aged 75)
- Occupation: Executioner
- Years active: 1957–1987

Thomas Berry Bruce (August 16, 1919 – October 12, 1994) was the Mississippi executioner active from 1957 until 1987, during which time he was the only US executioner on public record. He executed between 14 and 16 people, including Jimmy Lee Gray, during his career. For many years, his wife was unaware of his occasional duty; she thought that he only marketed fruits and vegetables to grocery stores. Bruce received $250 per execution. All of his executions were conducted using the gas chamber.
