= Edward Brice (cricketer) =

English cricketer

Edward Archibald Bruce
- Born: 1 September 1849; Andhra Pradesh
- Died: 14 November 1918; Hove
- Occupation: cricketer

Lieutenant-Colonel Edward Archibald Bruce (born Brice; 1 September 1849 – 14 November 1918) was an English cricketer who played first-class cricket in six matches for Gloucestershire as a right-arm fast bowler.

== Life ==
Born in what is now Andhra Pradesh, in British India, he was son of Colonel Edward Brice of the Madras Infantry. He was educated at Cheltenham College.

He died at Hove in Sussex.

== Cricketer ==
He took 20 wickets at a bowling average of 13.20, with two five-wicket hauls, both in 1872. In non-first-class cricket he made 30 appearances for Cheltenham College, Birkenhead Park and Somerset. He also served in the armed forces, stationed in Winchester. In August 1875 he changed his surname from Brice to Bruce, and scorecards after that date record his new surname.
