= Lunan, Angus =

Coordinates: 56.654251°N 2.510487°W

Lunan
- Location within Angus
- OS grid reference: NO688515
- Council area: Angus
- Lieutenancy area: Angus
- Country: Scotland
- Sovereign state: United Kingdom
- Post town: ARBROATH for Lunan Bay and MONTROSE for Lunan
- Postcode district: DD11 for Lunan Bay and DD10 for Lunan
- Dialling code: 01241 for Lunan Bay and 01674 for Lunan
- Police: Scotland
- Fire: Scottish
- Ambulance: Scottish
- UK Parliament: Angus
- Scottish Parliament: Angus

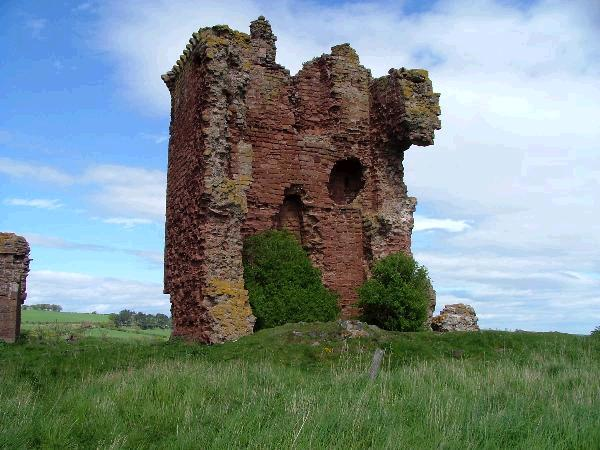
Ruins of Redcastle, on the south bank of the Lunan Water, opposite Lunan

Lunan is a hamlet in Angus, Scotland, in the parish of the same name, 6 kilometres (3.7 mi) south of Montrose. The hamlet overlooks Lunan Bay, which is itself also a hamlet, at the mouth of the Lunan Water. A 16th-century priest of Lunan church, which is in the hamlet of Lunan Bay, Walter Mill, was one of the last Scottish Protestant martyrs to be burned at St. Andrews. The church itself was rebuilt in 1844. The 15th-century Red Castle, so called from the red sandstone it is built from, is located 500 metres (1,600 ft) to the south of the hamlet, on the south bank of the Lunan Water.

Lunan was previously served by Lunan Bay railway station. Although the station has now closed, the line remains open as the Dundee–Aberdeen line.

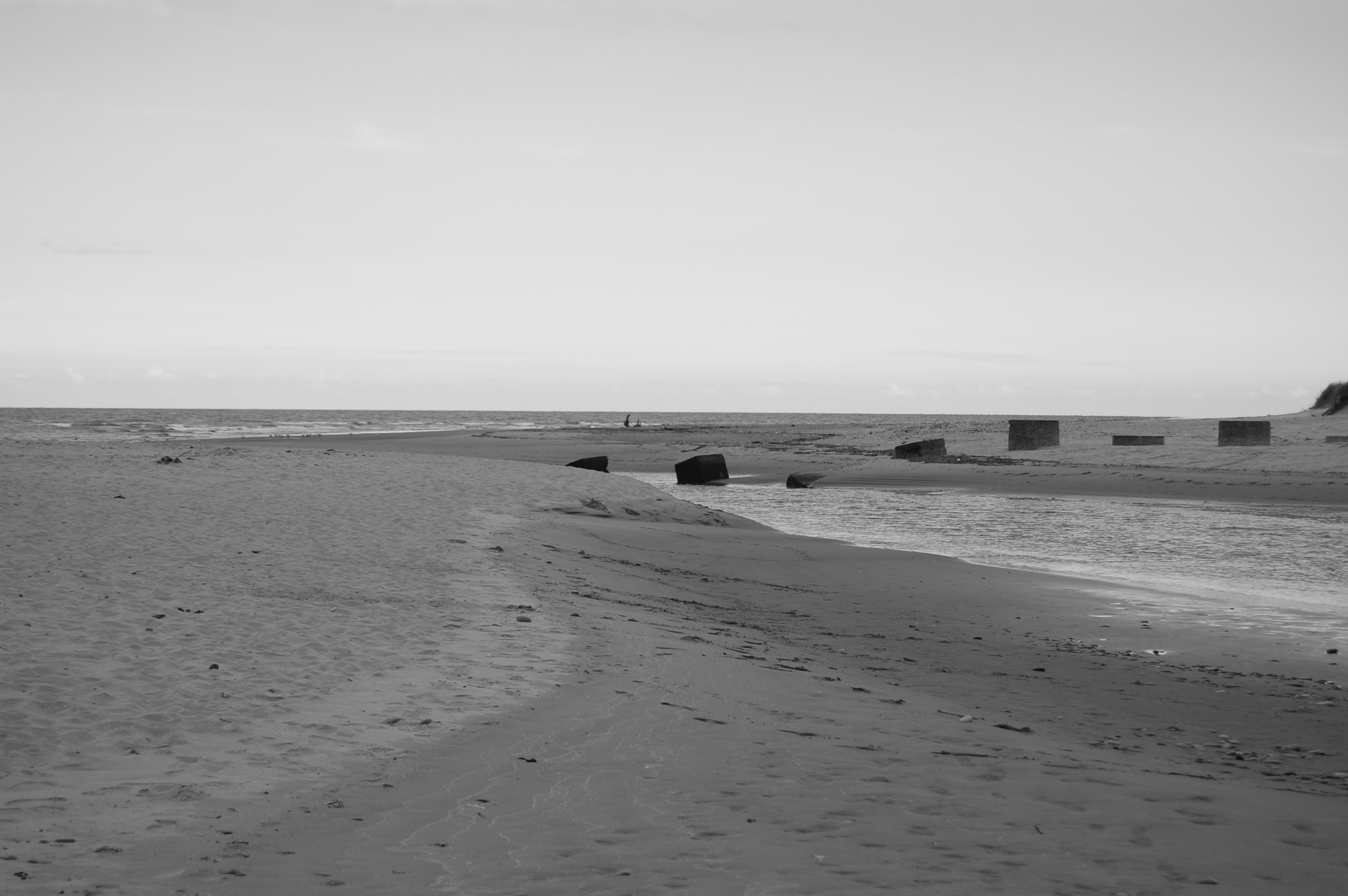
Lunan Bay. The concrete blocks across the Lunan Water are the remains of tank traps installed during World War II

== Sources ==
- Lunan in the Gazetteer for Scotland.
- Historic Environment Scotland. "Red Castle, Lunan (Site no. NO65SE 10)".
- Calderwood, David (1842). Thomson, Thomas Napier (ed.). The History of the Kirk of Scotland. Vol. 1. Edinburgh: Wodrow Society. pp. 337-343.
- Carslaw, William Henderson (1907). Six martyrs of the Scottish reformation (includes Patrick's Places). Paisley: A. Gardner, publisher by appointment to the late Queen Victoria. pp. 71–89.
- Foxe, John (1583). Foxe's Book of Martyrs. Vol. 8. p. 1298.
- Scott, Hew (1925). Fasti ecclesiae scoticanae; the succession of ministers in the Church of Scotland from the reformation. Vol. 5. Edinburgh: Oliver and Boyd. p. 445.
