= James Bruce (author) =

Journalist and author

James Bruce (1808–1861), journalist and author, was born at Aberdeen in 1808. He began his journalistic career in his native town, and there he published, in 1840, The Black Kalendar of Aberdeen, an account of the most remarkable trials before the criminal courts of that city, and of the cases sent up from that district to the High Court of Justiciary, from 1745 to 1830, with personal details concerning the prisoners. In the following year appeared his Lives of Eminent Men of Aberdeen, which contains, among other biographies, those of John Barbour, Bishop Elphinstone, chancellor of Scotland under James III, Jamieson the painter, and the poet Beattie.

While resident in Cupar, and editor of the Fifeshire Journal, he published in 1845, under the name of Table Talk, a series of short papers on miscellaneous subjects, which show a minute acquaintance with the byways and obscure corners of history and literature, and, two years later, a descriptive Guide to the Edinburgh and Northern Railway about the Edinburgh and Northern Railway.

In 1847 Bruce was appointed commissioner to The Scotsman newspaper to make inquiries into the destitution in the highlands. The results of his observations during a three months' tour appeared in The Scotsman from January to March 1847, and were afterwards published in the form of a pamphlet, bearing the title of Letters on the Present Condition of the Highlands and Islands of Scotland. The emigration of great numbers seems to him an immediate necessity, in order to narrow the field of operation before attempting relief. He advocates also the establishment of a compulsory poor law, and the joining of potato patches into small farms; and he pleads earnestly for the spread of education to rouse the people from their lethargy to a sense of new wants. On the whole, though he blames the neglect and selfishness of the proprietors, and quotes the verdict of one of the witnesses he examined, that "the ruin of the poor people in Skye is that there are whole miles of the country with nothing but sheep and gentlemen upon them", yet he finds the real cause of the distress in the indolence and lack of energy of the highlanders themselves. He was afterwards employed by The Scotsman on another commission, to report on the moral and sanitary condition of Edinburgh.

Bruce subsequently undertook in succession the editorship of the Madras Athenæum, the Newcastle Chronicle, and, during the latter years of his life, the Belfast Northern Whig.He was an occasional contributor to the Athenæum, and at the time of his death he was engaged on a series of papers for The Cornhill Magazine. His restless mind was ever finding interests too much out of the beaten track to allow him to be sufficiently absorbed in the events of the day; and his success as a journalist was, therefore, hardly proportionate to his abilities.

The two best known of Bruce's books are Classic and Historic Portraits (1853) and Scenes and Sights in the East (1856). The former is a series of sketches descriptive of "the personal appearance, the dress, the private habits and tastes of some of the most distinguished persons whose names figure in history, interspersed but sparingly with criticism on their moral and intellectual character". Scenes and Sights in the East is not a continuous book of travels, but a collection of picturesque views of life and scenery in Southern India and Egypt, with quaint observations on manners and men. Bruce died at Belfast on 19 August 1861.
