= Colin Bruce =

Colin Bruce may also refer to:

- Colin Bruce (actor), in the 1988 film Gotham and others
- Colin Bruce (author), British science writer
- Colin R. Bruce II, editor and chief compiler of Standard Catalog of World Coins
- Colin S. Bruce (born 1965), American federal judge

== See also ==
- Colin Bryce (born 1974), British bobsledder and television presenter
- Bruce Dwight Collins (born 1968), American radio host
