= Russell Bannock =

Canadian fighter ace (1919–2020)

Russell Bannock OOnt DSO DFC*
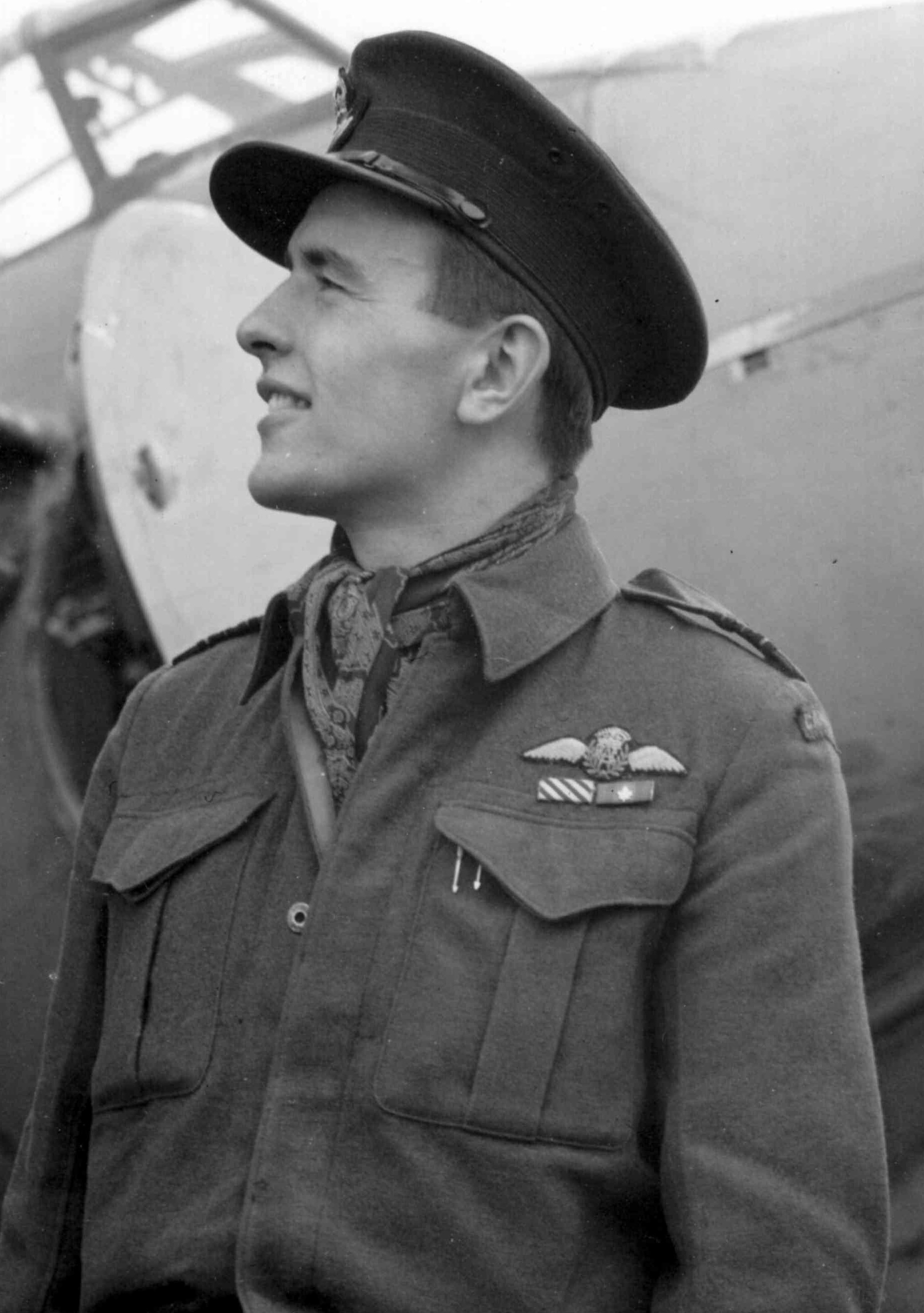
- Bannock in October 1944
- Born: Russell William Bahnuk; November 1, 1919; Edmonton, Alberta, Canada
- Died: January 4, 2020 (aged 100); Toronto, Ontario, Canada
- Military career
- Allegiance: Canada
- Branch: Royal Canadian Air Force
- Service years: 1941–1945
- Nickname: Russ
- Conflicts: World War II
- Awards: Order of Ontario; Distinguished Service Order; Distinguished Flying Cross & Bar; French Legion of Honour
- Other work: Aviator and test pilot

Russell William Bannock OOnt DSO DFC* (born Bahnuk; November 1, 1919 – January 4, 2020) was a Canadian fighter ace during the Second World War and a chief test pilot for de Havilland Canada.

== Early years ==
Bannock was born in Edmonton in 1919, and worked as a commercial pilot before the Second World War, obtaining his private pilot's license in 1938 and his commercial pilot's license in 1939.

== World War II ==
After entering the Royal Canadian Air Force (RCAF), Bannock received his pilot's wings in 1940 and was appointed as an instructor at Trenton, Ontario. Later he was posted to Royal Air Force Ferry Command from June to August 1942. In September 1942, Bannock became chief instructor with the Flying Instructor School at Arnprior in Ontario. Bannock's request for overseas service was granted in 1944 and he joined 60 OTU based in RAF High Ercall, England.

In June 1944, Bannock was then transferred to No. 418 Squadron RCAF, flying intruder missions over Europe with the de Havilland Mosquito Mk. VI fighter-bomber. He quickly proved adept at this type of operation and achieved his first victories. In October 1944, he was promoted to Wing Commander and took command of the squadron. Bannock also flew 'Diver' operations against the German V-1 "flying bombs" launched against London and southern England. On one mission he shot down four V-1s in one hour. A bar to his Distinguished Flying Cross (DFC) was added for his missions against the V-1s.

Bannock was transferred to No. 406 Squadron RCAF in November 1944 as commanding officer, and was awarded the Distinguished Service Order (DSO). By April 1945, Bannock had destroyed 11 enemy aircraft (including 2 on the ground), 4 damaged in the air and 19 V-1's destroyed. Bannock became Director of Operations, RCAF Overseas Headquarters, in London in May 1945 until September 1945 when he attended the Royal Air Force Staff College.

== Post-Second World War ==
Retiring from the RCAF in 1946, Bannock joined the de Havilland Canada Aircraft Company as chief test pilot, flying prototypes like the Beaver and various short take-off and landing aircraft. In 1950, Bannock became Director of Military Sales and later Vice President and President from 1976 to 1978. In 1968, he formed his own consulting business, Bannock Aerospace Ltd.

In 1956, Bannock was appointed an associate fellow of the Canadian Aeronautical Institute. He was also chairman of the Canadian Aerospace Industries Association's Export Committee 1964–1968, and was a director from 1976 to 1977. Bannock was also President of the Canadian Fighter Pilots Association, Director of the Canadian Industrial Preparedness Association, and the Canadian Exporters Association.

In the late 1990s, his wartime navigator, Robert Bruce, recorded his Symphony in B flat, dedicated to Bannock and in part inspired by the night sorties they flew together. In 2011, he was made a member of the Order of Ontario "for his contributions to the aerospace industry". Bannock died at a hospital in Toronto in January 2020 at the age of 100.
