= Lucinda Bruce-Gardyne =

Scottish chef and writer

Lucinda Bruce-Gardyne FRSE is a Scottish chef and writer who specialises in cookery and food allergies.

== Biography ==
Lucinda Bruce-Gardyne studied Physiology at Queen Mary University of London. After graduation, she trained at Leiths School of Food and Wine in London and worked as a section chef at Terence Conran's restaurant Bibendum. In 1998, she returned to teach at Leiths, where she was commissioned to write the Leiths Techniques Bible.

She lives in Edinburgh with her husband and three children, two of whom suffer from dairy, egg and wheat allergies.

After publishing her book on cooking for food allergies in 2007, Bruce-Gardyne worked on developing the recipe for a perfect, fresh gluten-free loaf. In April 2009, she launched Genius Fresh White and Brown Gluten and Wheat Free bread into the retail market the UK and founded the company Genius Foods Ltd based in Edinburgh.

Genius bread has won three awards since its launch – Award for the Most Innovative Product from Coeliac UK; Award for Innovation at the Foods Matter Free-From Food Awards; and Award for Innovation at the Bakery Industry Awards.

== Honours ==
Bruce-Gardyne was elected a Fellow of the Royal Society of Edinburgh in March 2017.

== Books ==
- Leiths Techniques Bible (co-authored with Sue Spaull), Bloomsbury (2003); ISBN 0-7475-6046-3—this book has won two major awards since publication:

a) "Best Book in the World for Food Professionals", Gourmand Book Awards, 2003
b) Top 10 "The Most Useful Cookery Books Ever", Waitrose Food Illustrated, 2005.

- How To Cook For Food Allergies, Macmillan; ISBN 1-905744-04-8 (published 19 October 2007)
