= Lethem (surname) =

Lethem is an Old English pre 6th century geographical location name specifically from Lathom in Ormskirk, Lancashire.

== Meaning ==
The meaning of the name is not confirmed however, it is suggested that the name is taken from the words 'lade' or 'lathe' (a barn) or that the name means 'dweller at the barns'.

== Notable people ==
Notable people with the surname include:

- Gordon James Lethem (1886–1962), British civil servant
- Roland Lethem (born 1942), Belgian filmmaker and writer
- Jonathan Lethem (born 1964), American novelist, essayist, and short story writer
