= Michael Bruce (minister, born 1635) =

Church of Scotland minister

The Reverend Michael Bruce
- Minister of Killinchy

Personal details
- Born: 1635
- Died: 1693 (aged 58–59) Anwoth, Wigtonshire
- Denomination: Presbyterian
- Spouse: Jean Bruce (m. 1659)
- Children: James Bruce

Michael Bruce (1635–1693) was a Scottish Presbyterian minister. He graduated MA at Edinburgh in 1654; was minister of Killinchy, County Down, in 1657; continued to preach, in defiance of the bishop, through 1660; was outlawed in 1664; returned to Scotland in 1666; was sentenced to transportation for field-preaching in July 1668, and imprisoned in London; allowed to return to Killinchy in 1670; driven out by the rebellion in 1688; and was finally minister of Anwoth, Wigtonshire from 1689 until death.

== Origins ==
Michael Bruce was the first of a line of seven Bruces, Presbyterian ministers in Ireland in six successive generations. He was the third and youngest son of Patrick Bruce of Newtown, Stirlingshire, by Janet, second daughter of John Jackson, merchant of Edinburgh. Robert Bruce, who anointed Anne of Denmark at Holyrood, 17 May 1590, was his grand-uncle.

== Ordination ==
Bruce graduated at Edinburgh in 1654. He is said to have begun to preach in 1656. In that year John Livingstone of Ancrum, formerly minister of Killinchy, County Down, paid a visit to his old charge, with a view to settle there again. This he did not do, but on returning to Scotland he looked out for a likely man for Killinchy, and at length sent Bruce with a letter (dated 3 July 1657) to Captain James Moore of Ballybregah "to be communicated to the congregation". Bruce was ordained at Killinchy by the Down Presbytery in October 1657. At the Restoration, Bruce's position was very precarious, but he refused a call to Bothkennar, Stirlingshire, in 1660, and though deprived for Nonconformity by Bishop Jeremy Taylor, he continued to preach and administer the sacraments "at different places in the parish, in kilns, barns, or woods, and often in the night". Patrick Adair, though he pays a high tribute to Bruce's "integrity and good intentions", yet intimates that he and other young ministers did more harm than good, affixing the stigma of lawlessness on the whole Presbyterian party in Ulster. On 23 June 1664 he was outlawed, along with John Crookshanks of Raphoe. He was ordered to give himself up to the authorities on 27 July. At length, in 1665 or 1666, Bruce returned to Scotland, not to keep quiet there, for in June 1666 his field preachings procured him a citation before the Lords of the Privy Council in Edinburgh as "a pretended minister and a fugitive from Ireland".

== Banishment ==
He did not answer the summons, but persisted in his "seditious and factious doctrine and practice". Early in June 1668 he was arrested, in his own hired house near Stirling, by Captain George Erskine, governor of Stirling Castle. He made every effort to escape, wounding one of his captors, and being himself badly wounded. He was lodged in the castle, and the Privy Council on 4 June directed that no one should have access to him, "except it be physicians or chirurgeons". On 18 June order was given to transfer him to the Edinburgh Tolbooth, and on 2 July he was charged before the council by the King's Advocate. Admitting and defending his practice of preaching and baptising in houses and the fields, he was banished out of His Majesty's dominions of Scotland, England, and Ireland, under the penalty of death. He signed a bond of compliance.

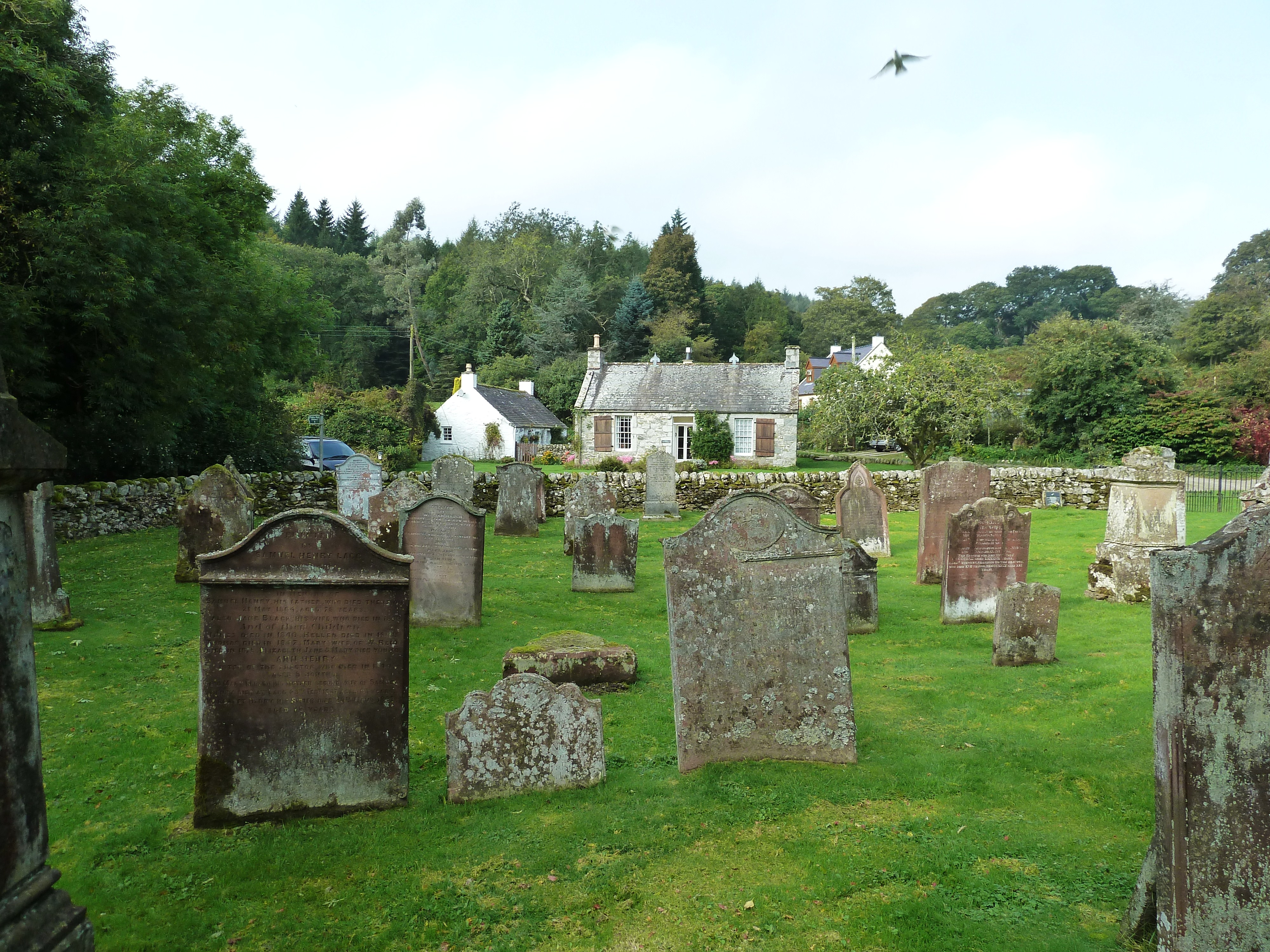
Graveyard at Anwoth Old Kirk

From the print of his sermon, preached in the Tolbooth on the following Sunday, it appears that Virginia was to be the place of his exile. But an order from Whitehall (dated 9 July) directed the Privy Council to send him up to London "by the first conveniency by sea". On 13 September he was conveyed to Prestonpans, and thence in the ship John to London. A royal warrant committed him to the Gatehouse at Westminster. It is said that he was to have been transported to Tangier. His wife in vain presented his petition for "sustenance or release". He was allowed to preach at the Gatehouse, and among his audience was Lady Castlemaine, one of Charles II's favourites. Through her influence a second petition (still extant) was more successful. The King declined to remit the sentence of banishment, but allowed Bruce to select his place of transportation. With much quickness he at once asked to be sent to "Killinchy in the woods". The end was that his kinsman, the Earl of Elgin, procured for him a writ quashing all past sentences, and he got back to Killinchy with his family in April 1670.

In the summer of 1670 his people set about building him a meeting-house (rebuilt 1714). Though Roger Boyle, who had succeeded Jeremy Taylor as Bishop of Down and Connor, instituted proceedings against him and others for preaching without license, Berkeley, the Lord-Lieutenant, and James Margetson, the Primate, intervened, and the Presbyterians were left unmolested. In 1679 Bruce signed an address presented by the Down Presbytery to the Irish Government, disclaiming any complicity "with the rising of the Scottish Covenanters put down at Bothwell Bridge. He was frequently over in Scotland during this period; we find him in 1672 at Carluke, and in 1685; in Galloway.

His final retreat to Scotland was in 1689. At this point war had broken out, and he was "forced over from Ireland to Galloway by the Irishes". He had several offers of a charge, but went of his own accord to Anwoth, Wigtonshire, a parish made famous by the ministry of Samuel Rutherford. The late incumbent, James Shaw, had been ousted by the people. Bruce was a member of the General Assembly of 1690. He was called to Jedburgh, but decided to remain at Anwoth. Some curious stories are told of his predictions; the most remarkable is, that on 27 July 1680, the day of the Battle of Killiecrankie, he was preaching at Anwoth, and declared that Claverhouse "shall be cut short this day. I see him killed and lying a corpse".

== Death ==
At Anwoth he died in 1693, and was buried in the church. He was in his fifty-ninth year, and the thirty-seventh of his ministry.

== Family ==
He married (contract dated 30 May 1659) his cousin Jean, daughter of Robert Bruce of Kinnaird, and granddaughter of the Robert Bruce mentioned above. In his second petition from the Gatehouse he speaks of his "family of young and helpless children left behind him" in Scotland. Three of his children died young, and were buried at Killinchy. His eldest son was James Bruce (c. 1660 – 1730).

== Legacy ==
Bruce published nothing himself, and the rough quaint sermons issued as his were taken from the notes of his hearers.

1. A Sermon preached by Master Michael Bruice, in the Tolbooth of Edinburgh, the immediate Sabbath after he received the sentence of exile for Virginia, 4to, n.d. (text, Psalm 140:12–13).
2. The Rattling of the Dry Bones; or, a sermon preached in the night-time at Chapel-yard in the parish of Carluke, Clydsdale. May 1672, 4to, n.d. (text, Ezekiel 37:7–8).
3. Six Dreadful Alarms in order to the right improving of the Gospel; or the substance of a sermon, &c., 4to, n.d. (text, Matthew 7:24; printed about 1700).
4. Soul Confirmation; or a sermon preached in the parish of Cambusnethen in Clyds-dail, Jac. 1709, 4to (text, Acts 14:22).
5. A Collection of Lectures and Sermons, preached mostly in the time of the late persecution, &c., Glasgow, 1779, 8vo (edited by J. H., i.e. John Howie; reprinted as Sermons delivered in times of persecution in Scotland,’ Edinburgh, 1880, 8vo, with biographical notices by the Rev. James Kerr, Greenock; contains three sermons by Bruce on Genesis 42:25, Psalm 119:133, and Mark 9:13).
6. A manuscript collection by Daniel Mussenden, merchant of Belfast, 13704, contains a sermon on Matthew 28:1–4, "preached in Scotland" by "Mr. Mihail Bruce".
