= Lloyd Bruce =

American baseball player (1907–1988)

- Pitcher
- Born: May 15, 1907; Sherman, Texas, U.S.
- Died: March 28, 1988 (aged 80); Muskogee, Oklahoma, U.S.
- Batted: Unknown Threw: Right

Negro league baseball debut
- 1940, for the Chicago American Giants

Last appearance
- 1940, for the Chicago American Giants
- Stats at Baseball Reference

Teams
- Chicago American Giants (1940)

Lloyd Bruce (May 15, 1907 – March 28, 1988) was an American professional baseball pitcher in the Negro leagues. He played with the Chicago American Giants in 1940.

In some contemporary newspaper reports, he is referred to as Sam Bruce.
