= David Bruce (inventor) =

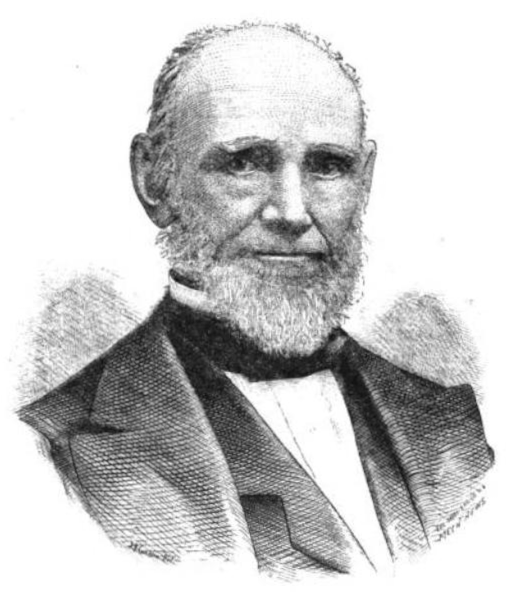
- Born: February 6, 1802; New York, New York
- Died: September 13, 1892 (aged 90); New York, New York
- Occupations: Printer, inventor

David Bruce Jr. (February 6, 1802 – September 13, 1892) was a New York industrialist whose inventions revolutionized the printing industry.

== Biography ==
David Bruce was born on Dey Street in Lower Manhattan on February 6, 1802. (Note: Some sources give his birthplace as Wick, Scotland. This may be a confusion with his father, who was born there in 1770.)

In 1838, he invented the Pivotal Typecaster, and subsequently patented it in 1845.

An example of the Pivotal Typecaster can be found in the Printing Museum of the firm of William Clowes Ltd. in Beccles in the English county of Suffolk.

Bruce died at his home in Williamsburg, Brooklyn on September 13, 1892.
