= Admiral Bruce =

Admiral Bruce may refer to:

- Henry Bruce (Royal Navy officer, born 1792) (1792–1863), British Royal Navy admiral
- Henry Bruce (Royal Navy officer) (1862–1948), British Royal Navy admiral
- James Andrew Thomas Bruce (1846–1921), British Royal Navy admiral
