= Governor Bruce =

Governor Bruce may refer to:

- James Bruce, 8th Earl of Elgin (1811–1863), Governor of Jamaica from 1842 to 1846 and Governor General of the Province of Canada from 1847 to 1854
- Charles Andrew Bruce (1768–1810), Governor of Prince of Wales Island in 1810
