= Warsaw Rising (game) =

1978 board wargame

- Designers: Kenneth Clark
- Publishers: Fusilier Games
- Publication: 1978
- Genres: World War II

Warsaw Rising is a board wargame published by Scottish game publisher Fusilier Games in 1978 that simulates the Warsaw Uprising during World War II.

== Background ==
In the summer of 1944, German occupying forces were preparing to abandon Warsaw as Soviet forces neared the city. The Polish underground resistance, the Armja Krajowa (Home Army), wanting to take control of the city to prevent a Soviet takeover, chose this moment to rise up against the German occupiers, believing the Germans would be forced to flee in short order due to the Soviet arrival. However, the Soviets deliberately halted their advance well short of the city, removing any pressure from the Germans to retreat, and leaving the under-equipped Poles to fight an entire German division by themselves.

== Description ==
Warsaw Uprising is a two-player board wargame in which one player controls German forces and the other controls Polish forces. The 17" x 23" cardstock hex grid map covers 1944 Warsaw and its environs. The other components are 120 die-cut counters and a short rulebook.

There is only one scenario, which lasts 12 turns, each turn covering 5–6 days. There are no zones of control in the game, so it is difficult for German units to stop Polish units from moving through German lines. Movement is also allowed through the city sewers. The Germans start the game with tanks and Goliaths (self-propelled demolition charges), both of which can be captured by the Poles. Later in the game, the Germans also gain access to Stuka dive bombers and a massive long-range railway gun.

=== Reinforcements ===
German units that are eliminated return as reinforcements three turns later. The Polish player only gets reinforcements by using supply points, which are gained by seizing key German positions. For example, capturing a normal building gains 2 supply points, and capturing the airfield is worth 24 supply points. The Poles are also supplied intermittently by Allied air drops, and can also cannibalize captured tanks, Goliaths, and unexploded shells from the railway gun.

=== Victory conditions ===
The Polish player wins by either holding one of three bridges across the Vistula River at the end of Turn 9, or by holding one of the 18 Major Buildings on the west side of the Vistula River at the end of the game. The German player wins by preventing the Polish victory conditions.

== Publication history ==
In 1977, a wargaming group in Aberdeen, Scotland founded Fusilier Games to publish the wargames they had developed for play among themselves. The new company produced three games in 1977, including Warsaw Uprising, designed by Kenneth Clark.

Fusilier publicized that they had many more games under development, but ultimately only two more games were published in 1978 before the company went out of business.

== Reception ==
In Issue 28 of the British wargaming magazine Perfidious Albion, Andrzej Cierpicki called this game "excellent value for the money in spite of its amateurish graphics." Cierpicki noted "the historical notes are excellent. It's nice to see someone with an appreciation of both the military and political background of the subject covered." Cierpicki found the game "plays fast and fluently and in spite of its slightly abstract nature has a remarkable historical feel." However, Cierpicki pointed out that "one of the road bridges across the Vistula River has been omitted from the map! This however, is a simple matter to put to right." Cierpicki also noted that the Stukas should arrive on Turn 2 rather than Turn 5, and the rail gun should debut in Turn 4, not Turn 3. Despite these issues, Cierpicki concluded, "Warsaw Rising represents good value in both physical and play terms and is not a game to be played only once and then left on the shelf."

In Issue 15 of the British wargaming magazine Phoenix, Ken Newall called this "On the whole, an interesting game, enjoyable and relatively short." Newall questioned the lack of rules for holding major roads, as the Germans did with tanks, in order to break up the Polish resistance into smaller pockets. Despite this, Nutall concluded, "Yes — a fine game — well done, Fusilier Games: keep up the good work."

== Reviews ==
- Perfidious Albion #29 (July 1978) p. 13-14
