= Senator Bruce =

Senator Bruce may refer to:

== Members of the United States Senate ==
- Blanche Bruce (1841–1898), U.S. Senator from Mississippi from 1875 to 1881
- William Cabell Bruce (1860–1946), U.S. Senator from Maryland from 1923 to 1929

== United States state senate members ==
- George A. Bruce (1839–1929), Massachusetts State Senate
- Terry L. Bruce (1944–2026), Illinois State Senate
- Terry Bruce (politician) (born 1975), Kansas State Senate
