= Charles Bruce (physicist) =

Scottish electrical engineer and amateur astrophysicist

- Born: 19 April 1902; Bournemouth, England
- Died: 30 December 1979 (aged 77)
- Education: University of Edinburgh
- Awards: FInstP
- Scientific career
- Fields: Physics

Charles Edward Rhodes Bruce (C.E.R. Bruce) FIEE FInstP (19 Apr 1902 in Shettleston – 30 Dec 1979) was a Scottish electrical engineer and amateur astrophysicist.

== Education and career ==
Bruce was the son of a tailor. His family moved soon after his birth from Glasgow to Newport-on-Tay, where he went to primary school. At the age of 14, he went to Dundee to be educated at the High School of Dundee. He then matriculated at the University of Edinburgh where he graduated MA and BSc in 1924 with First Class Honours in Mathematics and Natural Philosophy.

He then started training at the Moray House Teachers Training College, and was offered teaching positions at the High School of Dundee and Daniel Stewart's College, where he had carried out his practical teacher training; instead, he joined the Electrical Research Association (now ERA Technology Ltd) in Leatherhead, England, on the recommendation of his former professor, E. T. Whittaker.

Bruce was elected as a fellow of the Institute of Physics in 1946 and of the Institute of Electrical Engineers in 1947. In 1952, he submitted his papers on electrical discharges to Edinburgh University and was subsequently awarded a Doctorate of Science in 1953.

Bruce retired from ERA in 1967. He married in 1971, late in his life, Jenny Davidson, a childhood friend to whom he had been briefly engaged while he was a university student. He died in 1979, after a long illness.

== Electrical work ==
Bruce's first years at ERA were spent working on the analysis of oil-based circuit breakers. He published a sequence of papers on the subject including one that won the Institute of Electrical Engineers' Kelvin Premium award, and helped keep ERA on top of the then-rapid growth in circuit breaker technology. In 1939, still at ERA, he shifted his attention to lightning. His 1941 paper "The lightning discharge" is heavily cited, and was again the winner of the Kelvin premium. His contributions included a significant strengthening of the electrical gradients known to occur in lightning strikes, and a demonstration that grounding of transmission lines may be counterproductive.

== Astrophysics ==
Beginning in 1941, when he attended a lecture on astrophysics at Edinburgh University, Bruce's own interests headed in the same direction. He immediately developed a theory that solar prominences consisted of electrical discharges in plasma, rather than of moving solar matter, and he eventually published over 100 papers concerning the electrical basis of various cosmological phenomena. However, his work in this area has been largely ignored by mainstream science.
