= Jane Bruce =

Canadian teacher (1847 or 1848 - 1907)

- Born: 1847 or 1848; Musquodoboit Valley, Nova Scotia
- Died: November 30, 1907; Halifax, Nova Scotia
- Occupation: Teacher

Jane Bruce (1847 or 1848 – 30 November 1907) was a Canadian teacher and principal. She became known as the white teacher and then principal of a segregated school for black girls and then boys in Halifax.

== Biography ==
Born in Nova Scotia's Musquodoboit Valley, Bruce was the daughter of John Bruce and Mary Ann Scott and never married.

Bruce spent some time in the United States, likely teaching in Boston for a period. In her 30s, she returned to Nova Scotia where she attended the normal school in Truro, earning a diploma and, in 1883, a first-class license to teach. That same year, she started teaching at Lockman Street School in central Halifax, a segregated school for black girls. Her yearly salary was $300. The next year, the school was merged with the Maynard Street School for “coloured” boys, creating a coeducational, but still segregated, school, and Bruce was appointed principal and granted increased wages to $500.

In 1884 the city's black residents had, after years of protests and campaigning, gained the right to attend integrated primary schools rather than one of the two segregated schools (the other school was in Africville). As the white principal of a segregated school, Bruce was viewed with suspicion by the black community. She was charged with assaulting a pupil in 1886 (she won the case), and was investigated by the school board after letters she wrote to the board, in which she privately referred to her students as "darkeys", were made public. The investigation exonerated Bruce, but she resigned her position in 1892.

When she reapplied for the teacher position in 1893, the board declined to hire her. After a few weeks, she was hired her as a substitute teacher at Albro Street School in her old neighbourhood in January 1894 and in the following September, Bruce received a one-year probationary appointment there. In time, she was appointed to a full-time teaching position, but she had lost her seniority and was working for less pay than before. She remained at the Albro Street school until 1901 when she took the job of teaching at the old Acadian School on Argyle Street. Eventually, she rose to become that school's principal, and she was working there when she died in 1907.

As a single woman and career teacher in late Victorian Halifax, Bruce lived a difficult life. She moved from house to house about every two years and insisted that her salary was insufficient. She regularly asked the school board for a raise in wages and even asked parents to intervene on her behalf to promote her cause. Despite her peculiarities (such as hanging her laundry in the classroom) she was thought to be "an exceptionally good teacher". When she died, Bruce "left the astounding sum of $10,000 to be fought over by her siblings and their offspring in the United States and to be used as proof by civic officials in Halifax that female teachers did not need a higher salary scale."
