= Everend Lester Bruce =

Canadian geologist (1884–1949)

Everend Lester Bruce FRSC (3 August 1884, in Leeds and Grenville, Ontario, Canada – 5 October 1949, in Kingston, Ontario) was a Canadian geologist, known for his research on the economic mineralogy and geology of Precambrian metalliferous deposits in Canada. According to James Edwin Hawley, Bruce was in the 1930s and 1940s "regarded as the dean of Canadian pre-Cambrian geologists."

== Biography ==
Born in Toledo, Ontario, Everend Lester "Louis" Bruce graduated from Queen's University at Kingston with a B.Sc. in 1909 and a B.A. in 1911. From 1912 to 1915 he was a graduate student at Columbia University. There he received his M.S. and Ph.D. under James Furman Kemp and Charles Peter Berkey. Bruce's Ph.D. thesis Geology and Ore-deposits of Rossland, B.C. was published in 1917 by the British Columbia Department of Mines. He spent a year as a postdoc studying under Charles R. Van Hise and Charles Kenneth Leith at the University of Wisconsin–Madison. From 1912 to 1918 he worked with the Ontario Department of Lands and Mines and the Geological Survey of Canada to investigate Precambrian metalliferous deposits in northern Ontario, northern Manitoba, and northern Saskatchewan. In 1919 Bruce joined the faculty of Queen's University at Kingston. In 1920 he was appointed to the professorial chair vacated by Norman L. Bowen, who was a professor of mineralogy at Kingston from 1918 to 1920. Bruce added substantially to the mineral collections acquired by Professor William Nicol, who retired as professor emeritus of mineralogy in 1918. In the department of geology of Queeni's University at Kingston, Bruce was appointed to the Willet G. Miller Memorial Research Professorship in 1929 and held that appointment until his death in 1949 at age 65 from a heart attack. From 1944 to 1949 was the head of the department of geology.

Bruce's explorations in northern Manitoba, northern Saskatchewan, and Ontario's Red Lake gold area established a foundation for the geological study for copper and gold mining in those territories. He did pioneering geological research in Ontario's Little Long Lac Mine area and contributed considerably to geological knowledge about the Michipicoten River district. He also did field work in the Rossland district of British Columbia, northwestern Quebec's gold-copper region, the Northwest Territories, and the iron deposits of Labrador. With Jakob Sederholm in 1930, he investigated Finland's Precambrian geology. Bruce did geological consulting work for various companies and attended international geological conferences in Spain, the Soviet Union, and England.

Bruce received many honours. He was elected a Fellow of the Royal Society of Canada in 1923. He was elected in 1943 the president of the Geological Society of America for a one-year term. His retiring presidential address was published in 1945. In 1948 he was elected vice-president of the Society of Economic Geologists for a one-year term. At Queen's University at Kingston, a wing of Miller Hall is named in Bruce's honour.

He married in 1923. He was predeceased by his wife and survived by their two sons.

== Selected publications ==
=== Articles ===
- Bruce, E. L. (1917). "Magnesian Tourmaline from Renfrew, Ontario". Mineralogical Magazine and Journal of the Mineralogical Society. 18 (84): 133–135. Bibcode:1917MinM...18..133B. doi:10.1180/minmag.1917.018.84.08.
- Alcock, F. J.; Bruce, E. L. (1921). "Pre-Cambrian rocks of Manitoba". Geological Society of America Bulletin. 32 (2): 267–292. Bibcode:1921GSAB...32..267A. doi:10.1130/GSAB-32-267.
- Bruce, E. L. (1927). "Coutchiching Delta". Geological Society of America Bulletin. 38 (4): 771–782. Bibcode:1927GSAB...38..771B. doi:10.1130/GSAB-38-771.
- Bruce, Everend Lester (1929). "The Sherritt-Gordon copper-zinc deposit, northern Manitoba". Economic Geology. 24 (5): 457–469. Bibcode:1929EcGeo..24..457B. doi:10.2113/gsecongeo.24.5.457.
- Bruce, E. L.; Jewitt, Walter (1936). "Heavy Accessories of certain pre-Cambrian Intrusives of the Canadian Shield". Geological Magazine. 73 (5): 193–213. Bibcode:1936GeoM...73..193B. doi:10.1017/S0016756800097387. S2CID 129866750.
- Bruce, Everend Lester; Samuel, Watkin (1937). "Geology of the Little Long Lac Mine". Economic Geology. 32 (3): 318–334. Bibcode:1937EcGeo..32..318B. doi:10.2113/gsecongeo.32.3.318.
- Bruce, E. L. (1939). "The Canadian Shield and Its Geographic Effects". The Geographical Journal. 93 (3): 230–239. Bibcode:1939GeogJ..93..230B. doi:10.2307/1788358. JSTOR 1788358.
- Bruce, E. L.; Russell, G. A. (1939). "Petrography of the Crystalline Limestones and Quartzites of the Grenville Series". Geological Society of America Bulletin. 50 (4): 515–528. Bibcode:1939GSAB...50..515B. doi:10.1130/GSAB-50-515.
- Bruce, Everend Lester (1941). "Albite and gold; discussion". Economic Geology. 36 (4): 455–458. Bibcode:1941EcGeo..36..455B. doi:10.2113/gsecongeo.36.4.455.

== Books and monographs ==
- Bruce, Everend Lester (1918). Amisk-Athapapuskow Lake District.
- Bruce, Everend Lester (1933). Mineral Deposits of the Canadian Shield.
