= Robert Bruce (British Army officer, born 1813) =

Robert Bruce (15 March 1813 – 27 June 1862) was a British Army officer who served as Governor to the young Prince of Wales, later King Edward VII.

== Family background ==
He was the fourth son of Thomas Bruce, 7th Earl of Elgin, and the Earl's second son by his second wife Elizabeth, daughter of James Townsend Oswald. James Bruce, 8th Earl of Elgin was his elder brother, and his younger brothers included Frederick Wright-Bruce and Thomas Charles Bruce.

== Military service ==
Bruce entered the Army at the age of seventeen, with the purchase of a commission as ensign and lieutenant in the Grenadier Guards on 18 June 1830. His promotion to lieutenant and captain was purchased on 22 February 1833. Bruce served as adjutant of the regiment from 28 May 1835 until July 1836 and then on the staff of Sir Edward Blakeney, the commander-in-chief in Ireland. Bruce served as military secretary to his brother Lord Elgin, the governor of Jamaica, from 1841 to 1846, in the meantime being promoted captain and lieutenant-colonel in the Grenadier Guards, again by purchase, on 2 August 1844. He acted again as military secretary to his brother from 1847 to 1854, during Elgin's term as Governor-General of the Province of Canada, and on 20 June 1854 he was granted brevet rank as colonel. He returned to England in that year and served briefly as a surveyor-general at the Board of Ordnance. He was promoted major of his regiment, without purchase, on 16 September 1856, and served until he retired as a lieutenant-colonel on the half-pay unattached list on 7 December 1858.

== Governor of the Prince of Wales ==
In 1858 Bruce was appointed governor to the seventeen-year-old Prince of Wales, following the dismissal of the Prince's tutor Frederick Waymouth Gibbs. He attended the Prince during his time at Christ Church, Oxford and Trinity College, Cambridge between 1859 and 1861, and accompanied him on his trips to Rome in 1859 and Canada and the United States in 1860. On 7 December 1859 he was promoted major-general. In 1862 he went with the Prince of Wales on a tour of the Near East, where he caught a fever. He died at St James's Palace in the rooms of his sister Lady Augusta Bruce, later wife of Dean Stanley. Following Bruce's death Sir William Knollys was appointed comptroller and treasurer to the Prince.

== Marriage ==
Bruce was married on 2 May 1848 to Katherine Mary, second daughter of Sir Michael Shaw Stewart, 6th Baronet. Their son John McGregor Bruce was born on 10 June 1849 in Doune, Perthshire, Scotland. Katherine was appointed a Woman of the Bedchamber to Queen Victoria in 1866, and was a Lady of the Order of Victoria and Albert. She died on 3 December 1889.
