= James Bruce (minister) =

Irish minister of the Presbyterian General Synod of Ulster

The Reverend James Bruce
- Minister of Killeleagh

Orders
- Ordination: After 6 November 1684

Personal details
- Born: c. 1660/61
- Died: 1730 (aged about 70)
- Denomination: Presbyterian
- Spouse: Margaret Trail (m. 1685; died 1706)
- Children: Michael Bruce; William Bruce

James Bruce (c. 1660/61–1730) was an Irish Presbyterian minister, the eldest son of Michael Bruce, minister of Killinchy County Down. He was minister of Killeleagh, County Down in 1684; but fled to Scotland in 1689; returned to Killeleagh in 1692, and founded a Presbyterian college there in 1697. He joined the subscribers to the Westminster Confession in 1721, but was tolerant to the non-subscribers.

== Origins ==
He was educated at Edinburgh University and ordained in 1684. He was called to Carnmoney, County Antrim, but preferred a settlement at Killeleagh, County Down (near Killinchy, his father's place), where he was ordained after 6 November 1684.

== Ministry ==
In April 1689 occurred 'the break of Killeleagh', when the Protestants were routed and Killeleagh Castle deserted by its garrison. Bruce fled to Scotland, but returned in 1691 or 1692, when Ulster was at peace. In 1696 he secured, from the Presbyterian proprietors of the Killeleagh estate, endowments for the Presbyterian minister at Killeleagh (and three others) in the shape of a lease of lands at a nominal rent. More important was his success in establishing at Killeleagh in 1697 a 'philosophical school' for the training of the Presbyterian ministry and gentry, which proved obnoxious to the local Episcopalians and was closed in 1714.

In 1699 Bruce was appointed one of the Synod's trustees for the management of the regium donum and continued in this office till his death. His congregation was large; at his communion on 2 July 1704 there were seven successive tables and the services began at 7 a.m. and lasted till evening. A new meeting house was built for him probably in 1692. In the nonsubscription controversy (1720–6) Bruce sided with the subscribers (himself signing the Westminster Confession in 1721), but was unwilling to cut off the nonsubscribers from fellowship. His Presbytery (Down) was in 1725 divided into Down and Killeleagh, those (including Bruce) who were against disowning the nonsubscribers being placed in the latter.

== Death ==
Bruce died on 17 February 1730. His will (dated in February 1725) directs his burial at Killeleagh, where he was interred on 24 February. Tradition places the spot eastward of the Episcopal church.

== Family ==
He married, on 25 September 1685, Margaret (died May 1706), daughter of Lieutenant-colonel James Trail of Tullychin, near Killeleagh, by Mary, daughter of John Hamilton, brother of the first Lord Clandeboye. He had ten children, of whom three sons and three daughters survived him.

His sons Michael and Patrick were Presbyterian ministers; William was a publisher. From his son Patrick (1692–1732), minister successively of Drumbo, County Down, Killallan, Renfrewshire, and Killeleagh, are lineally descended the Hervey Bruces of Downhill, baronets since 1804.

Bruce published nothing. In Daniel Mussenden's manuscript volume of sermon notes is an abstract of Bruce's sermon (Proverbs 8:17) at a communion in Belfast, dated 20 August 1704, which is strongly Calvinistic.
