= George Bruce =

George Bruce may refer to:

- George Bruce of Carnock (c. 1550–1625), Scottish engineer
- George Bruce (industrialist) (1781–1866), American printer, industrialist and inventor
- George Barclay Bruce (1821–1908), British civil engineer
- George Barrett Bruce (1816–1884), American musician and music author
- George Bruce (footballer) (1879–1928), Australian rules footballer
- George A. Bruce (1839–1929), Massachusetts politician
- George Bruce (writer) (1898–1974), Two Years Before the Mast (film)
- George Bruce (poet) (1909–2002), Scottish poet
- George Bruce (bishop) (1942–2024), bishop of the Anglican Diocese of Ontario
- George Bruce, 7th Lord Balfour of Burleigh (1883–1967), Scottish peer and banker
