= J. Gregory Bruce =

American judge (1897–1985)

Senior Judge of the United States Tax Court
- In office June 1, 1967 – December 31, 1981

Judge of the United States Tax Court
- In office May 28, 1952 – May 31, 1967
- Appointed by: Harry S. Truman
- Preceded by: James Russell Leech
- Succeeded by: Samuel B. Sterrett

Personal details
- Born: February 16, 1897 Edinburgh, Indiana
- Died: December 4, 1985 (aged 88) Bethesda, Maryland
- Education: Transylvania University (A.B. 1921); University of Kentucky (LL.B. 1924)

John Gregory Bruce (February 16, 1897 – December 4, 1985) was a judge of the United States Tax Court from 1952 to 1967.

Born in Edinburgh, Indiana, Bruce attended schools in Indiana and Pineville, Kentucky, and served in the United States Navy from 1918 to 1921. He received an A.B. from Transylvania University in 1921, followed by an LL.B. (cum laude) from the University of Kentucky in 1924, where he was editor-in-chief of the Kentucky Law Journal. Bruce gained admission to the bar in Kentucky in 1923. He was an attorney for the Fordson Coal Company (a subsidiary of Ford Motor Company) in Pineville, Kentucky and Detroit, Michigan, from 1924 to 1931, and was thereafter in private practice in Pineville until 1934.

He served as an attorney in the United States Department of Justice from 1934 to 1936, and was chief of the Trial Division of the Bureau of War Risk Litigation from 1936 to 1943, assistant chief of the Frauds Section, Claims Division, from 1943 to 1951, and chief of that section from 1951 to 1952. On April 17, 1952, President Harry S. Truman nominated Bruce to a seat on the United States Tax Court vacated by the death of Judge J. Russell Leech. Bruce took the oath of office on May 28, 1952, and was reappointed by President Dwight D. Eisenhower on May 13, 1958, for a succeeding 12-year term, but retired on May 31, 1967. He was recalled to perform further judicial duties on June 1, 1967.

== Personal life and death ==
Bruce married Zilpha Foster, with whom he had three sons. Bruce died in his home in Bethesda, Maryland, at the age of 88.
