= James Bruce (judge) =

James Bruce (1691–1749) was the chief justice of Barbados and the son of Alexander Bruce of Gartlet. Through the paternal line James Bruce was a direct descendant of Thomas Bruce, 1st Baron of Clackmannan.

== Background and ancestry ==
Sir James Bruce was born in 1691 in Clackmannan to Alexander and Margaret Bruce Earl of Gartlet. Sir James's grandfather, Robert Bruce, was the esquire of Kennet. James Bruce was also a collateral relative of Robert the Bruce through his paternal great grandfather, Archibald Bruce Lord Balfour of Burleigh and husband to Margaret Bruce. Margaret Bruce was the only daughter of Robert Bruce of Wester Kennet, and she continued his lineage through Archibald. Sir James was a descendant of De Brus through an illegitimate daughter of Robert II.

== Death ==
James Bruce died on 19 September 1749 and was buried at All Hallows Staining in London, England; his wife Keturah, who died in 1775, was also buried at All Hallows. Keturah was the daughter of Joseph FRENCH Esq. and sister of Elizabeth FRENCH who married Thomas SHARPE.

== Sources ==
- https://books.google.com/books?id=GJ3KCnhqAdMC&pg=PA446&dq=governor+joseph+bruce+barbados
- http://www.brucefamily.com/lineage.htm#gartlet
