= North British, Arbroath and Montrose Railway =

Railway line in Scotland

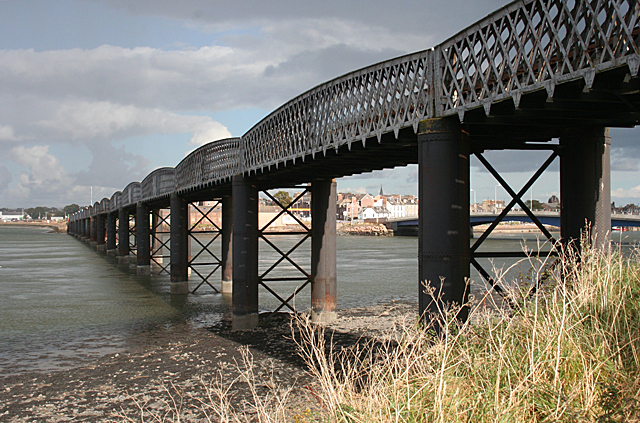
- The rebuilt South Esk Viaduct

Overview
- Locale: Scotland
- Dates of operation: 1881 (freight); 1883 (passengers)–present (Note: Before the line opened, the company was amalgamated with its parent company, the North British Railway (NBR). In 1923, the NBR became part of LNER. Most of the line is still open.)
- Successor: North British Railway

Technical
- Track gauge: 1,435 mm (4 ft 8 1/2 in)
- Length: 16 miles 8 chains (25.91 km) (Note: Including the ½ mile (800m) branch to Montrose South Harbour.)

North British, Arbroath, and Montrose Railway Act 1871
- Act of Parliament
- Parliament of the United Kingdom
- Long title: An Act to authorise the Construction of the North British, Arbroath, and Montrose Railway.
- Citation: 34 & 35 Vict. c. cxxiii

Dates
- Royal assent: 13 July 1871

Text of statute as originally enacted

The North British, Arbroath and Montrose Railway was a company established by the North British, Arbroath, and Montrose Railway Act 1871 (34 & 35 Vict. c. cxxiii) to construct and operate a railway line from north of Arbroath via Montrose to Kinnaber Junction, 38 miles (61 km) south of Aberdeen. The company was originally a subsidiary of the North British Railway but was absorbed into its parent in 1880.

Construction of the line was delayed and, as a result of tests following the Tay Bridge disaster, one viaduct had to be dismantled and rebuilt. Rivalry between the companies on the east and west coast routes from London to Aberdeen, known as the "Race to the North", culminated in 1895 – the crucial point was at Kinnaber Junction, where the two routes converged into a single railway.

== Railway line ==
Effectively a continuation of the North British line over the Tay Bridge, the single-track railway directly connected the older Arbroath and Forfar Railway with the Aberdeen Railway to the north. North British had running rights over the Caledonian Railway to Aberdeen. There was a short branch line to Montrose South Harbour and a junction with the Montrose and Bervie Railway. The railway opened in 1881, but for goods traffic only. It did not open for passenger traffic until 1 May 1883.

The main station was at Montrose, opened in 1883 and quite separate from the Caledonian Railway terminus nearby. A station was opened at Lunan Bay, which also served the nearby settlement of Lunan. The opening of the station made access to the area easier than by road. A nearby picturesque feature which was bridged by the railway is the deep ravine at Buckie Den.

The Hillside to Kinnaber Junction was built as double track, but the line was largely single track, which required tablets to be exchanged at five places – St Vigean's, Inverkeilor, Lunan Bay, Montrose and Hillside. Each exchange required slowing the train to about 35 mph (56 km/h). The exchange at St. Vigean's was removed when the North British Railway doubled the line from there to Inverkeilor in 1897, but it was replaced when a loop was constructed at Usan in 1906, and an exchange introduced there. Even so, travel time from Edinburgh to Aberdeen – over the Forth and Tay bridges – was reduced by one hour compared with the previous journey via Perth.

== Viaducts near Montrose ==
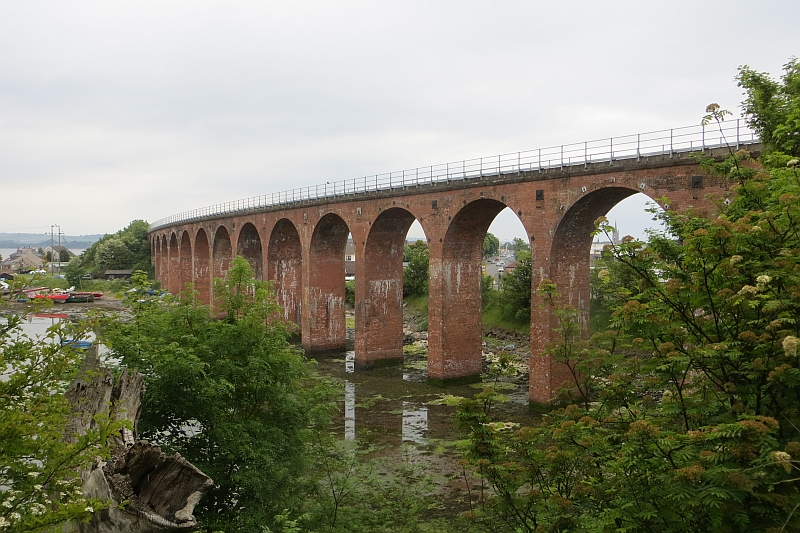
Ferryden Viaduct

Two viaducts south of Montrose were designed by Sir Thomas Bouch, the architect of the original Tay Bridge but, due to delays in building the Tay Bridge and the line by Dundee, they were not built until 1879. Construction was by Gilkes Wilson and Company, supervised by Bouch's son, William. The more northerly bridge, the South Esk Viaduct, was of iron lattice girder construction. (Note: In America, a "lattice girder bridge" is generally called a "lattice truss bridge".)

Following the Tay Bridge disaster of 1879, the viaduct was inspected and, although the plans showed a straight structure, it was found to have a distinct curve. As well, many of the piers were not perpendicular. Tests in 1880, over a period of 36 hours, using both dead and rolling loads, led to the structure becoming seriously distorted, and eight of the piers were declared unsafe. Before the line could be opened to traffic in 1881, the bridge had to be dismantled and rebuilt by Sir William Arrol, to a design by W. R. Galbraith.

The replacement was also of wrought iron lattice girder construction, based on designs dating back to the 1830s. Such designs were widely used by Victorian engineers, until rendered obsolete by the introduction of other American truss designs in the 1880s. South Esk Viaduct at Montrose was probably the last major bridge in the United Kingdom to be built with that type of bracing. The more southerly brick viaduct, the Ferryden Viaduct, was retained.

== Kinnaber Junction and the "Race to the North" ==
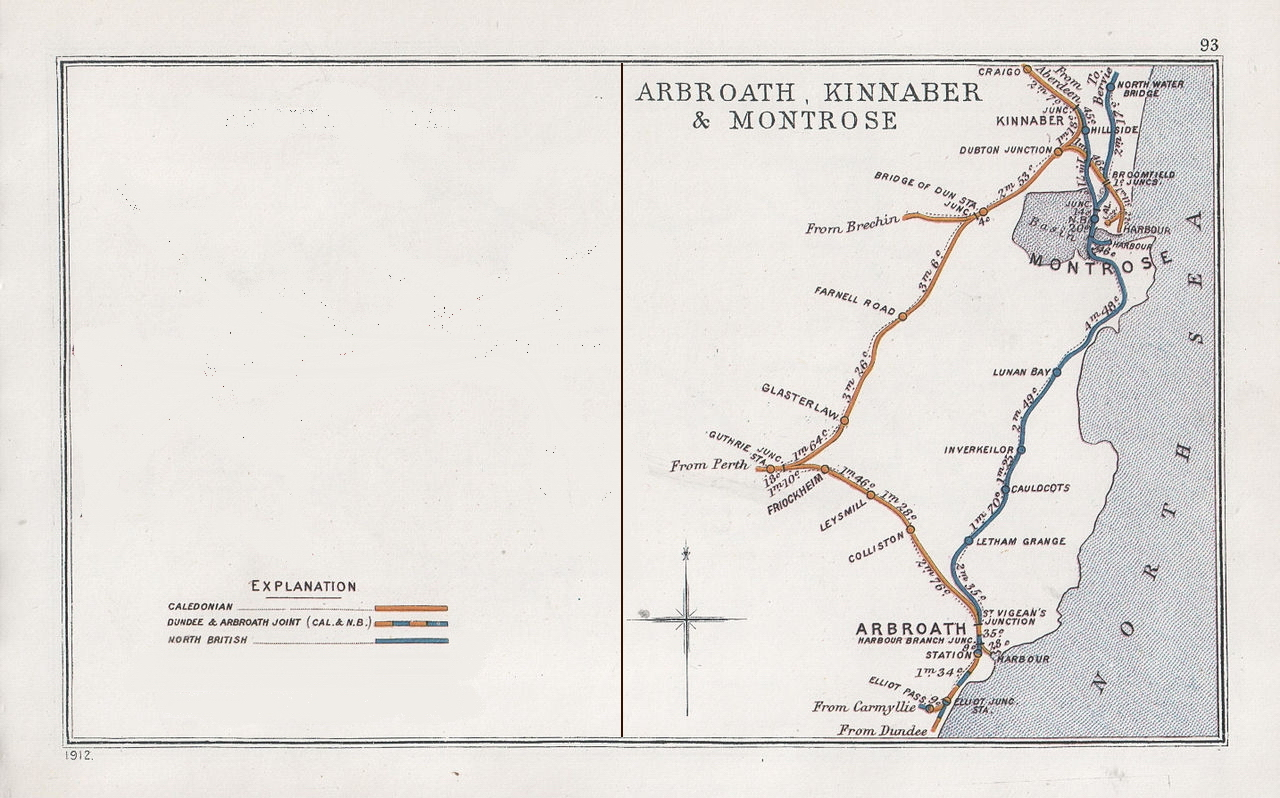
1912 Railway Clearing House Junction Diagram showing railways in the area

In the late 19th century, there was considerable competition between the companies on the West Coast lines and those on the East Coast, to provide the fastest overnight journey from London (Euston or King's Cross) to Aberdeen. In 1894, with both trains departing at 20:00, the earlier scheduled arrival time was 08:50, which became 05:40 in 1895. (Note: The 1895 arrival time is, of course, inconveniently early) The so-called "Race to the North", run over the two rival routes, reached a peak in August 1895. The first train to Kinnaber Junction signalbox, 38 miles (61 km) south of Aberdeen, would always win because, from there on, the two routes ran along the same railway. The signalman in the Kinnaber Junction signalbox was warned of the approach of trains on each route by a telegraphic bell signal from the signalbox to the south. He could only accept one train at a time so, if a train then approached on the other route, it would find that the signals were against it. Both trains would approach Kinnaber at very similar times, sometimes being in sight of each other across the Montrose Basin – indeed it has been said that on one occasion the two bells rang together.

== Present railway line ==
The line is still in use as part of the East Coast Main Line, with trains on the Edinburgh to Aberdeen Line and Glasgow to Aberdeen Line running over it, because the two routes now meet at Dundee. The line is the only railway to Aberdeen from the south. It has not been electrified but it is now all double track, except for the section over the two Montrose viaducts, from Usan to Montrose Station, which is the only single-track section of the East Coast Main Line. The line was duplicated in two stages, and three parts. The section from St. Vigean's Junction to Inverkeillor was doubled by the North British Railway on 20 June 1897, but it was left to the LNER to complete the sections from Inverkeillor to Usan Box, and from Montrose North to Hillside, with the work being done between 1928 and 1932.
