= Esquimalt Royal Navy Dockyard =

Dockyard in British Columbia, Canada

Esquimalt Royal Naval Dockyard
- Esquimalt, British Columbia
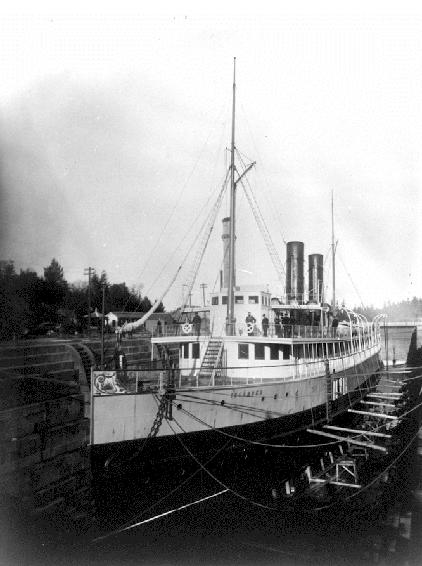
- SS Islander in the Esquimalt graving dock in the 1890s

Site information
- Type: Shipyard, dockyard
- Controlled by: Royal Navy (1842–1905) (Canada) Department of Marine and Fisheries (1905–1910); Royal Canadian Navy (1910–1968); Royal Canadian Navy (1968–present)

Location
- Coordinates: 48°25′52″N 123°25′54″W

Site history
- Built: 1842
- In use: 1842–present
- Battles/wars: Oregon boundary dispute (1840s); Crimean War 1854–1856; Pig War 1859; Alaska boundary dispute 1821–1903

Garrison information
- Past commanders: Henry William Bruce (25 November 1854–July 1857); Robert Lambert Baynes (8 July 1857–5 May 1860); Andrew K. Bickford (1900–1903)
- Garrison: Pacific Station (1865–1905); Royal Canadian Navy Pacific Command (1910–1968); Canadian Forces Maritime Forces Pacific (1968-present)
- Occupants: George W. Courtenay (circa 1848)

Esquimalt Royal Naval Dockyard was a major British Royal Navy yard on Canada's Pacific coast from 1842 to 1905, subsequently operated by the Canadian government as HMC Dockyard Esquimalt, now part of CFB Esquimalt, to the present day.

The naval dockyard was located in Esquimalt, British Columbia, adjacent to Esquimalt Harbour and the city of Victoria, to replace a base in Valparaíso, Chile, as the home of the Royal Navy's Pacific Station and was the only Royal Navy base in western North America.

== Harbour ==
A hydrographic survey carried out by HMS Pandora around 1842, determined that the location and depth of the Esquimalt Harbour would make it acceptable for use as a British naval port on the west coast of North America. The following year, James Douglas went out to Vancouver Island intending to set up a trading post for the Hudson's Bay Company. After looking at the shores of Esquimalt Harbour, he decided they were too densely wooded for development, so he opted to build what would become Fort Victoria on the shores of the adjacent Victoria Harbour and thereby establish what would become the city of Victoria. Pandora Avenue in Victoria is named in honour of the survey ship, which in turn was named after Pandora of Greek mythology.

In 1848, HMS Constance arrived at Esquimalt and became the first Royal Navy vessel based there. She was commanded by Captain George William Courtenay, after whom Courtenay, British Columbia, is named.

From 3 July 1850 to February 1854 Augustus Kuper was captain of HMS Thetis from her commissioning at HMNB Devonport. He sailed her to the southeast coast of America and then to Esquimalt. Kuper Island in the Strait of Georgia, off the east coast of Vancouver Island, was named for Captain Kuper after he surveyed the area from 1851 to 1853. Thetis Island and Thetis Lake are named for the survey ship. In 1852, sailors from the Thetis built a trail through the forest linking the Esquimalt Harbour with the Victoria Harbour and Fort Victoria. The trail would eventually be paved and is now known as Old Esquimalt Road (it runs parallel to and just north of Esquimalt Road).

In the summer of 1854, several ships, including President, Pique, Trincomalee, Amphitrite, and Virago, set out from Valparaíso and sailed across the Pacific Ocean, stopping at Marquesas Islands and then proceeding to Honolulu, where they met a French fleet of warships. In late August, the combined fleets sailed to Russia to engage in the Siege of Petropavlovsk, at which Commander-in-Chief Pacific Station David Price died. Captain of the Pique Frederick William Erskine Nicolson was brevetted and took command of the British naval forces from 31 August 1854 until the arrival of the next commander-in-chief.

== Construction begins ==
On 25 November 1854, Rear-Admiral Henry William Bruce, who had been at the West Africa Squadron, was appointed Commander-in-Chief, Pacific. Upon arrival at Esquimalt, Bruce asked Governor James Douglas to provide the navy with a hospital to receive the expected sick and wounded from the Crimean War. In 1855, three wooden huts were built on Duntze Head, which would also be known as Hospital Point. The buildings were the first shore establishment of the Royal Navy at Esquimalt.

In 1859, the British Colony of Vancouver Island started to construct lighthouses on the approaches to Esquimalt and Victoria Harbours, in part to support the Royal Navy and in part to support civilian navigation amidst the Fraser gold rush and other gold rushes. Fisgard Light was illuminated on 16 November 1860, and Race Rocks Light was lit on 26 December 1860.

In 1865, the facilities in Esquimalt were recognized as an alternate base for the Pacific Station, which was based in Valparaíso. The emphasis of the station started shifting more to British Columbia as the United Kingdom's economic interests shifted northward. The move also allowed the British Admiralty to avoid involvement in the Chincha Islands War (1864–1866) between Spain, Chile, and Peru.

== First graving dock ==
In the late 1860s and early 1870s, any navy vessel in need of hull repair at Esquimalt had to be taken to shipyards in Seattle, Washington, in the United States. Motivated by a desire to remove the dependence on American shipyards, and as a negotiated term enticing British Columbia to join confederation with Canada in 1871, a graving dock was constructed at Esquimalt starting in 1876. The graving dock was commissioned in 1887 and cost CA$1,177,664 to build. HMS Cormorant became the first vessel to use the new drydock on 20 July 1887. In its first seven years of use, the graving dock serviced 24 merchant ships and 70 navy ships. From 1887 through 1927, the graving dock averaged work on 21 vessels per year. The naval graving dock was put out of use until HMCS Coaticook docked there on 31 August 1945. Now over a century old, the dock is used regularly to service HMC ships and is part of the Fleet Maintenance Facility.

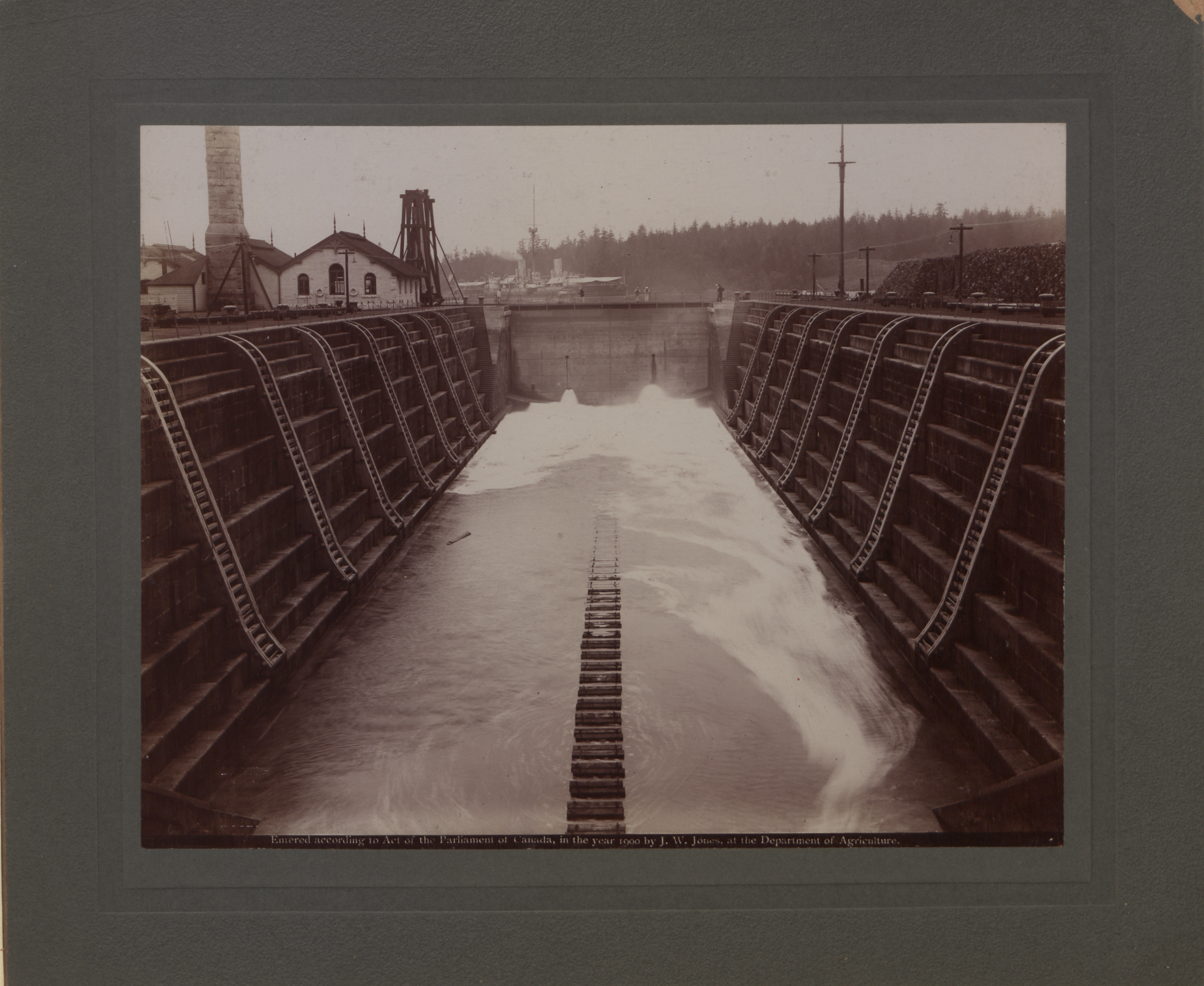
First Esquimalt Dry Dock, 1901, Photo: John Wallace Jones

== Royal Naval Dockyard closure ==
Esquimalt was vacated by the British Royal Navy at sunset on 1 March 1905. The Canadian Department of Marine and Fisheries took over control of the shore establishment and the responsibility of enforcing control of Canada's maritime interests in the area after the Royal Navy left. After passage of the Naval Service Act in 1910, there was a Canadian Naval Service (CNS) that controlled the base; the CNS became the Royal Canadian Navy in 1911. The geographic boundaries of the Royal Navy's Pacific Station would be added to that of the Bermuda-based North America and West Indies Station after the war, with Bermuda-based vessels reaching the Pacific Ocean via the Panama Canal, and utilising Esquimalt as a forward operating base when patrolling in the North Pacific.

== Esquimalt Graving Dock ==
Although the original graving dock was large enough to accommodate the largest ships in the British Pacific fleet at the time of its construction, by the early 20th century larger ships were routinely being built. In 1924, the government of Canada built a larger graving dock 500 metres (1,600 ft) distant, able to accommodate ships larger than Panamax size. Today, this dock is a separate facility named the Esquimalt Graving Dock. It is operated by Public Services and Procurement Canada and is the largest non-military hard bottom dry dock on the west coast of the Americas.

In February 1942, RMS Queen Elizabeth spent two weeks in the Esquimalt Graving Dock refitting and adding 3,000 extra berths for troopship duty. Stabilizer pockets have more recently been built into the concrete walls of the drydock. This new feature enables cruise ships to extend their stabilizers for inspection, maintenance and repair while in drydock.

== Dockyard ==
In the 1960s, a consolidation of defence forces in Canada led to the drydock's reformation as the Canadian Forces Base Esquimalt. It is now home to the Pacific Fleet of the Royal Canadian Navy. The dockyard, along with three nearby sites (the former Royal Navy Hospital, the Veterans’ Cemetery and the Cole Island Magazine) were designated the Esquimalt Naval Sites National Historic Site of Canada in 1995.

== See also ==
- CFB Esquimalt
