= Pacific Station =

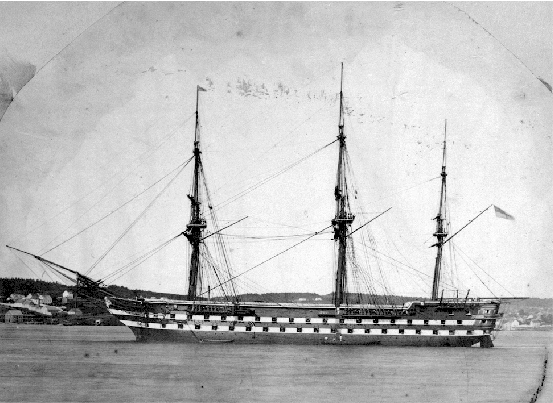
- HMS Ganges at anchor near Victoria Harbour
- Active: South America Station (1826–1837); Pacific Station (1837–1905)
- Disbanded: Sunset 1 March 1905
- Allegiance: United Kingdom
- Branch: Royal Navy
- Type: Fleet
- Part of: Admiralty
- Garrison/HQ: Valparaíso, Chile and Esquimalt Royal Navy Dockyard
- Notable ships: President
- Engagements: Siege of Petropavlovsk

Commanders
- Notable commanders: George Seymour, Fairfax Moresby, Thomas Maitland

The Pacific Station was created in 1837 as one of the geographical military formations into which the Royal Navy divided its worldwide responsibilities. The South America Station was split into the Pacific Station and the South East Coast of America Station.

== History ==
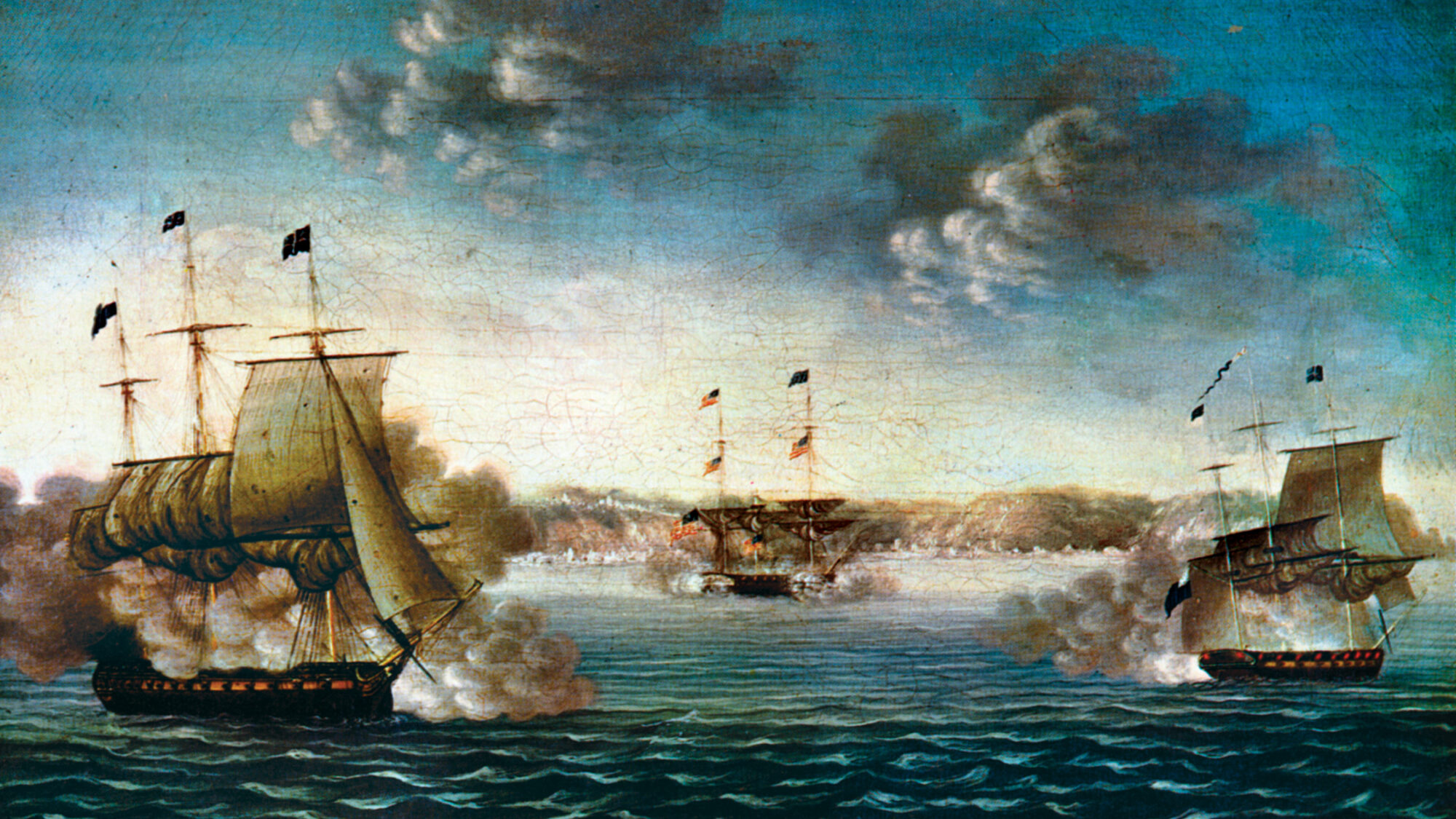
The capture of USS Essex by Phoebe and Cherub off Valparaíso, 28 March 1814

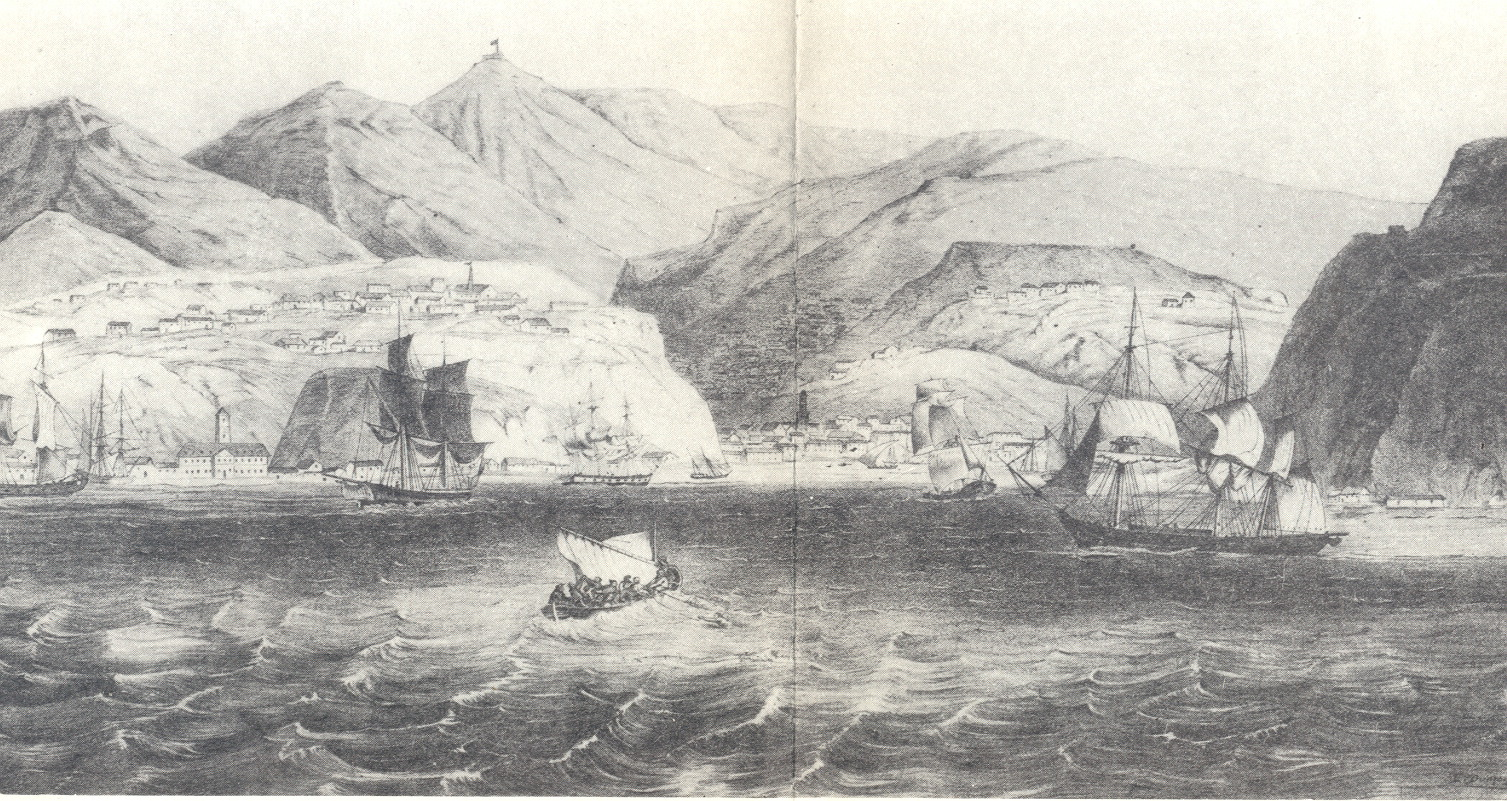
An 1830 illustration of Valparaíso Bay shows a mix of commercial and military vessels

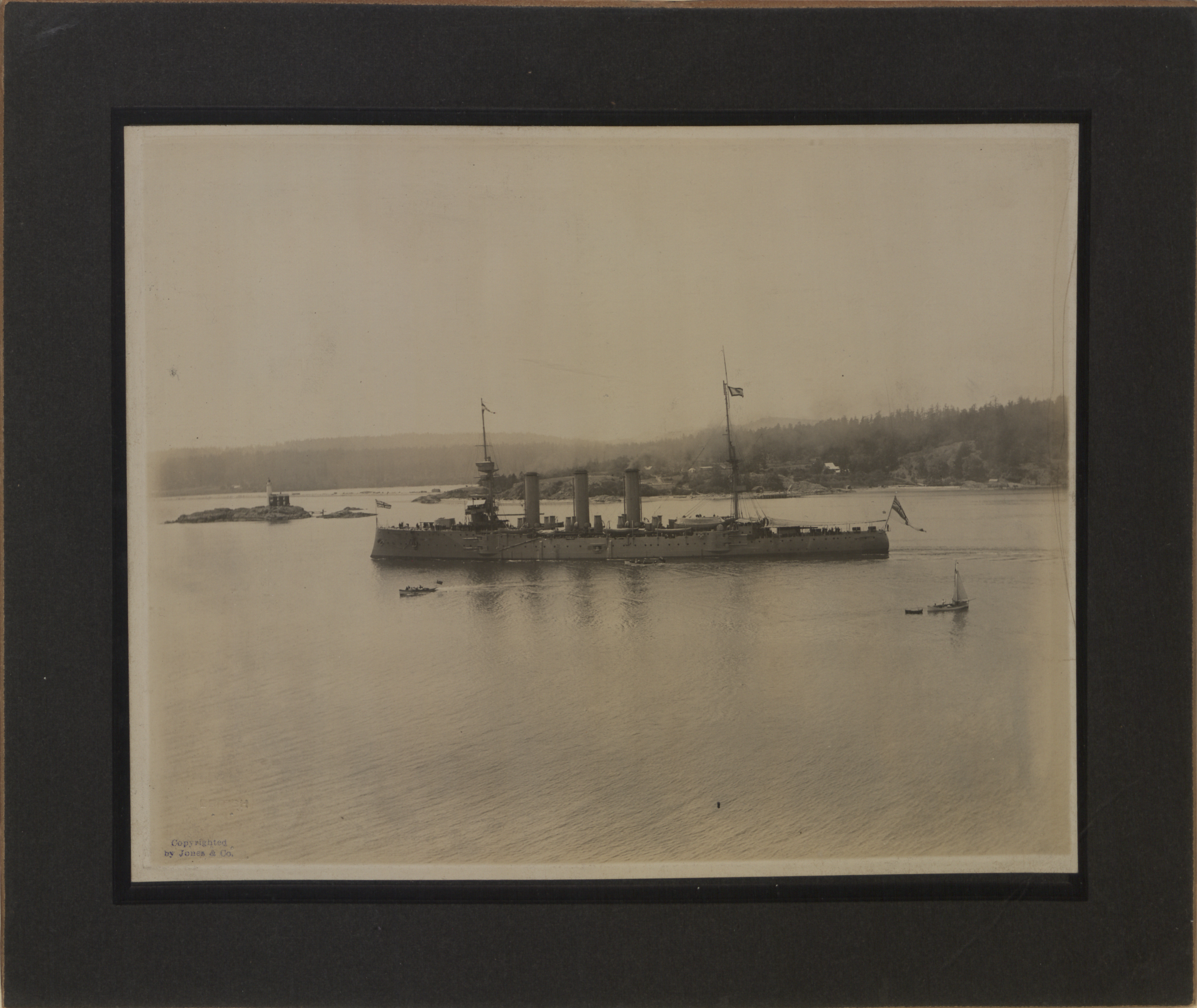
Unknown Monmouth-class cruiser in Esquimalt Harbour, 1906

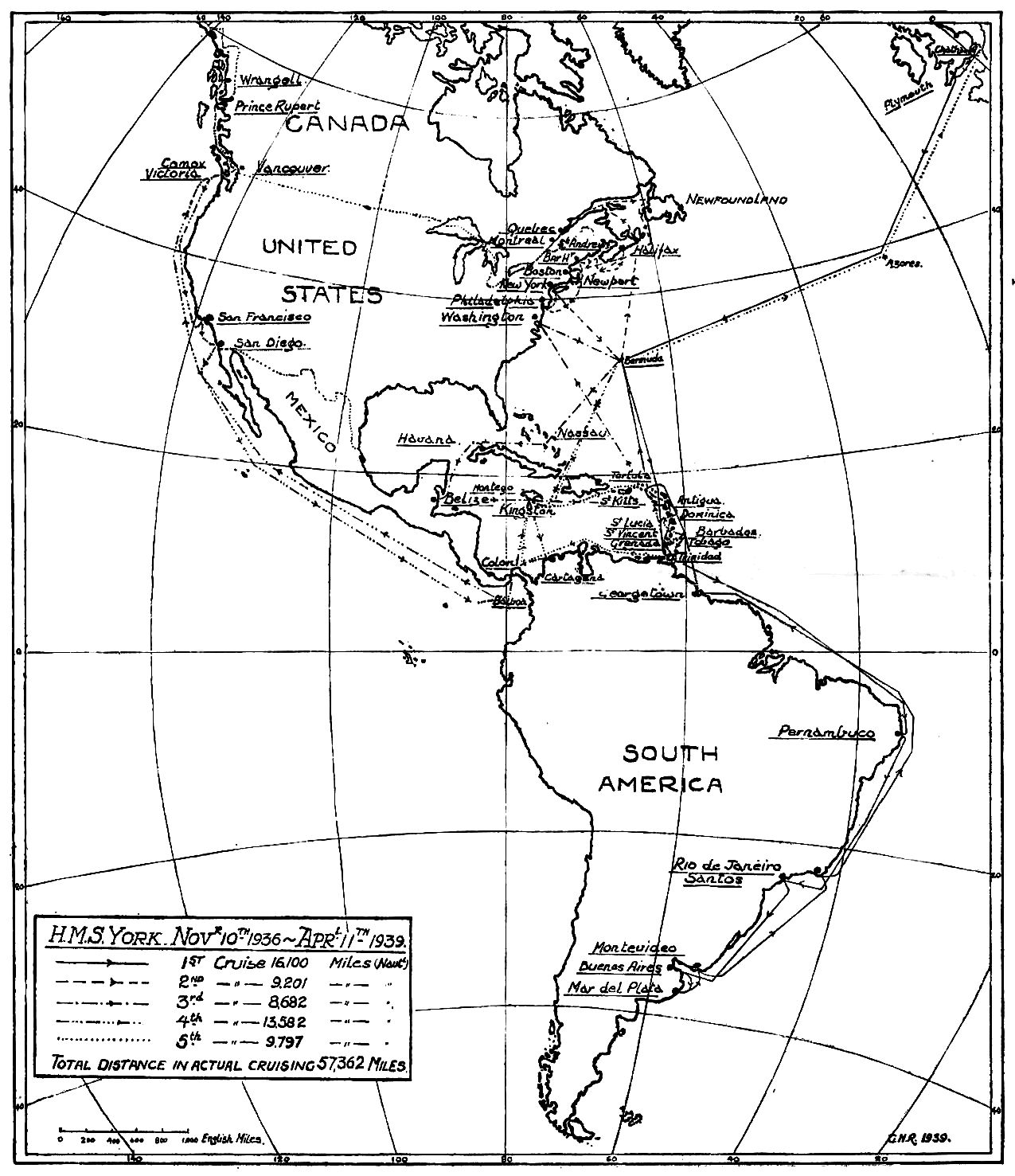
Bermuda-based cruisers of the America & West Indies Station, using the Panama Canal, would cruise the eastern Pacific after the First World War

The British Pacific Squadron was established in 1813 to support British interests along the eastern shores of the Pacific Ocean at Valparaíso, Chile. In 1837, when the South America station was split, this responsibility was passed to the Commander-in-Chief, Pacific. In 1843, George Paulet, captain of Carysfort, took her out from Valparaíso to Honolulu to demand the islands of the Kingdom of Hawaii for Britain. King Kamehameha III capitulated and signed the islands over to Paulet. In the summer of that year, Rear-Admiral Richard Darton Thomas set out from Valparaíso in Dublin to rein Paulet in. On 31 July 1843, Thomas assured the King that the occupation was over and that there was no British claim over the islands.

In 1842, Pandora was sent north to survey the coast of Vancouver Island and what would become the Esquimalt Royal Navy Dockyard. During the survey trip, the crew of Pandora found that Esquimalt Harbour had a size and depth suited for use as a Royal Navy harbour. As tensions between Britain and America rose during the Oregon boundary dispute a base at the southern end of Vancouver Island would help strengthen the British claim to all of the island. The Oregon Treaty of 1846 ceded control over all of the island to Britain. In 1848, Constance was sent to Esquimalt and was the first vessel to be stationed there. In the summer of 1854, several ships, including President, Pique, Trincomalee, Amphitrite, and Virago, set out from Valparaíso and sailed across the Pacific Ocean, stopping at the Marquesas Islands and eventually Honolulu, where they met a French fleet of warships. In late August, the combined fleets sailed to Russia to engage in the Siege of Petropavlovsk, during which Rear Admiral David Price, the Commander-in-Chief, died. Captain Frederick William Erskine Nicolson of Pique was brevetted and took command of the British naval forces from 31 August 1854 until the arrival of the next Commander-in-Chief. In 1855, three "Crimean huts" were built at Esquimalt to serve as a hospital intended to receive wounded from the Crimean War. The huts were the first shore establishment at Esquimalt.

The presence of forests full of straight grained conifers such as the Coast Douglas fir meant that Vancouver Island could provide shipbuilding material suitable for spar making in the Age of Sail. The later discovery of coal on the island and at Vancouver's Coal Harbour, meant that the area could also serve as a useful resource in the Age of Steam as well. Rear-Admiral Robert Lambert Baynes, aware of the political importance of maintaining British sovereignty amidst the San Juan Boundary Dispute and the British Columbia gold rushes recommended to the Admiralty a move of the station headquarters from Valparaíso to Esquimalt in November 1859.

By 1865, Esquimalt was recognized as the base headquarters of the Pacific Station. The move from Valparaíso to Esquimalt helped the Pacific Station avoid involvement in the Chincha Islands War (1864–1866) between Spain, Chile, and Peru. Rear-Admiral de Horsey ordered Shah commanded by Frederick Bedford, against the Nicolás de Piérola-led Huáscar in the Battle of Pacocha on 29 May 1877. In that battle, Shah fired one Whitehead torpedo at Huáscar, but it missed its mark and Huáscar got away.

A graving dock large enough to accommodate the largest ships in the Pacific fleet was commissioned at Esquimalt in 1887. After a period of relaxing tensions meant that British interests in British Columbia were secured, the Station was maintained to counter Russian ambitions in the Pacific. The Station was also crucial in defending British Columbia from the United States in the Alaska Boundary Dispute, during the contemporaneous 1898 Spanish–American War, when the US threatened to forcibly invade and annex British Columbia if its demands over Alaska were not met.

By the end of the 19th century, improved communications, the signing of the Anglo-Japanese Alliance and the need to concentrate warships in British waters to counter the developing German High Seas Fleet, meant that the station was closed down at sunset on 1 March 1905. Esquimalt Royal Navy Dockyard was transferred to the Canadian Department of Marine and Fisheries. The Pacific Station's responsibilities were divided between the China, Australia and the North America and West Indies Stations (the latter of which would also become responsible for the western South Atlantic, becoming the America and West Indies station after the First World War, with its Bermuda-based cruisers regularly cruising through the Panama Canal and up the western coast of North America to visit Esquimalt and other locations on the Pacific Coast of Canada).

After passage of the Naval Service Act in 1910, there was a Canadian Naval Service that controlled the base at Esquimalt and that service became the Royal Canadian Navy in 1911. In the 1960s, the amalgamation of defence services in Canada led to its re-constitution as Canadian Forces Base Esquimalt that includes HMC Dockyard.

== Commanders-in-Chief, Pacific ==
Most commanders-in-chief of the station held the rank of rear admiral, with the exceptions of Hamond and Hastings who were each promoted to vice admiral before being reassigned to other duties, and Goodrich who was a commodore.

List of Commanders-in-chief, Pacific (1837–1905)
Commander in Chief, Pacific	From	Until	Flagship	Notes
Rear Admiral Charles Ross	4 September 1837	1841	HMS President	
Rear Admiral Richard Thomas	5 May 1841	1844	HMS Dublin	
Rear Admiral Sir George Seymour	14 May 1844	25 August 1847	HMS Collingwood	
Rear Admiral Phipps Hornby	25 August 1847	21 August 1850	HMS Asia	
Rear Admiral Fairfax Moresby	21 August 1850	17 August 1853	HMS Portland	
Rear Admiral David Price	17 August 1853	30 August 1854	HMS President	Died at the Siege of Petropavlovsk
Rear Admiral Henry Bruce	25 November 1854	8 July 1857	HMS Monarch	
Rear Admiral Robert Baynes	8 July 1857	5 May 1860	HMS Ganges	
Rear Admiral Sir Thomas Maitland	5 May 1860	31 October 1862	HMS Bacchante	
Rear Admiral John Kingcome	31 October 1862	10 May 1864	HMS Sutlej	Promoted vice-admiral while in appointment on 5 March 1864; after whom Kingcome Inlet is named
Rear Admiral Joseph Denman	10 May 1864	21 November 1866	HMS Sutlej	
Rear Admiral George Hastings	21 November 1866	1 November 1869	HMS Zealous	Promoted to vice-admiral while in appointment on 10 September 1869
Rear Admiral Arthur Farquhar	1 November 1869	9 July 1872	HMS Zealous	
Rear Admiral Charles Hillyar	9 July 1872	6 June 1873	HMS Repulse	Promoted to vice-admiral while in appointment on 29 May 1873
Rear Admiral Arthur Cochrane	6 June 1873	15 April 1876	HMS Repulse	
Rear Admiral George Hancock	15 April 1876	6 August 1876	HMS Repulse	
Rear Admiral Algernon de Horsey	6 August 1876	21 July 1879	HMS Shah	
Rear Admiral Frederick Stirling	21 July 1879	10 December 1881	HMS Triumph	
Rear Admiral Algernon Lyons	10 December 1881	13 September 1884	HMS Triumph	
Rear Admiral John Baird	13 September 1884	4 July 1885	HMS Swiftsure	
Rear Admiral Sir Michael Culme-Seymour	4 July 1885	20 September 1887	HMS Triumph	
Rear Admiral Algernon Heneage	20 September 1887	4 February 1890	HMS Triumph; HMS Swiftsure	Promoted to vice-admiral while in appointment on 29 November 1889
Rear Admiral Charles Hotham	4 February 1890	2 March 1893	HMS Warspite	
Rear Admiral Henry Stephenson	2 March 1893	5 March 1896	HMS Royal Arthur	
Rear Admiral Henry Palliser	5 March 1896	20 March 1899	HMS Imperieuse	
Rear Admiral Lewis Beaumont	20 March 1899	15 October 1900	HMS Warspite	
Rear Admiral Andrew Bickford	15 October 1900	15 October 1903	HMS Warspite; HMS Grafton	
Commodore James Goodrich	15 October 1903	1 March 1905	HMS Grafton; HMS Bonaventure	

== Legacy ==
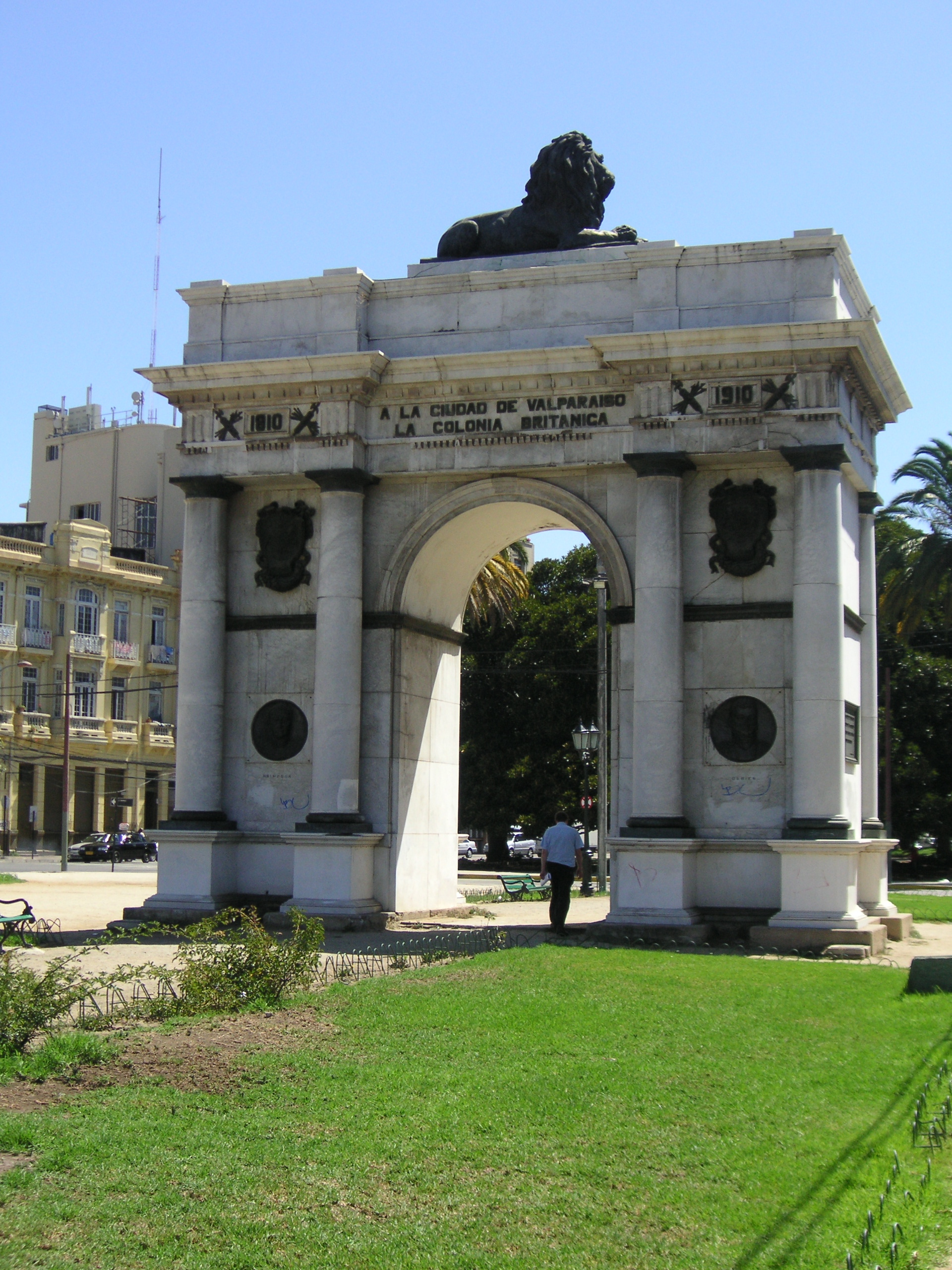
The British Arch, erected in 1911 on Brazil Avenue in Valparaíso, commemorates Lord Cochrane, Robert Simpson, and other founders of the Chilean Navy

The largest remnant of the Pacific Station is the CFB Esquimalt naval base in western Canada. Many geographical features of Vancouver Island and British Columbia are named after captains, commanders, and ships assigned to the Pacific Station. The British triumphal arch in Valparaíso was constructed to commemorate the British presence in the city, including several Naval commanders. Thomas Square in Honolulu is named after Admiral Richard Darton Thomas. Although Union Flags were flown over Hawaii as early as 1816, the current state flag of Hawaii design dates from the close of the Paulet Affair and features a British Union Flag in its canton to commemorate the help that Thomas rendered the Kingdom of Hawaii.

Charles Darwin's visits to Valparaíso, Cerro La Campana, and the Galápagos Islands led to publication of The Voyage of the Beagle which, along with later works such as On the Origin of Species, helped to establish the field of evolutionary biology.

== See also ==
- British Pacific Fleet – a World War II era fleet assembled to fight Japan
- China Station – a Royal Navy command that patrolled the Western Pacific Ocean in the 19th and 20th centuries
- Pacific Squadron – a division of the United States Navy between 1821 and 1907
- North America and West Indies Station
