= British Pacific Squadron =

Pacific Squadron
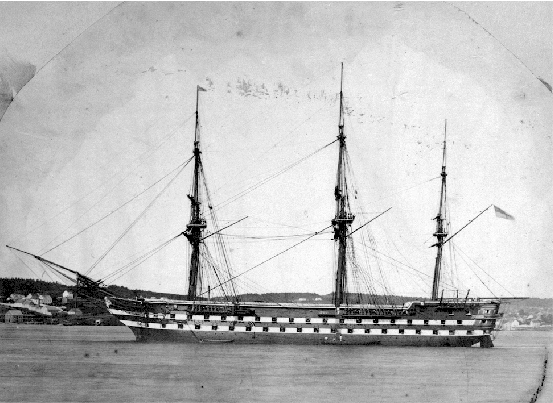
- HMS Ganges at anchor near Victoria Harbour
- Active: (1813–1837)
- Country: British Empire
- Branch: Royal Navy
- Type: Squadron
- Part of: Admiralty
- Garrison/HQ: Valparaíso, Chile & Esquimalt Royal Navy Dockyard
- Notable ships: President

The Pacific Squadron was a squadron of the British Royal Navy. It was formed in 1813 during the War of 1812. It was subordinate to the South America Station until 1837, when the British naval presence was reorganised into the Pacific Station and the South East Coast of America Station.

== Commodores of the Pacific Squadron ==
The following were commodores of the Pacific Squadron:

- Captain James Hillyar 1813–14
- Captain Thomas Staines 1814–15
- Captain John Fyffe 1815–16
- Captain William Bowles 1817–18
- Captain William Henry Shirreff 1818–21
- Commodore Thomas Masterman Hardy 1821–22
- Captain Lord Spencer February 1822
- Captain Henry Prescott July 1822
- Captain Thomas Brown October 1823
- Captain Thomas James Maling May 1824
- Captain Sir John Sinclair March 1827
- Captain Jeremiah Coghlan August 1828
- Captain Arthur Bingham November 1829
- Captain William Waldegrave July 1830
- Captain Lord James Townshend March 1832
- Captain Francis Mason August 1834
- Captain Thomas Ball Sulivan July 1837
