= HMS President (1829) =

Frigate of the Royal Navy

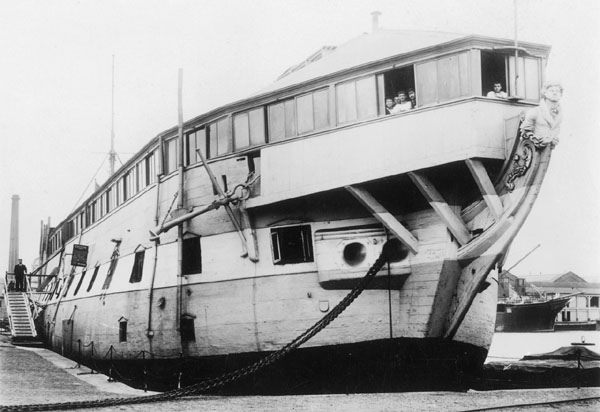
- HMS President in South West India Dock, London, ca. 1880

History

United Kingdom
- Ordered: 25 May 1818
- Builder: Portsmouth Dockyard
- Laid down: June 1824
- Launched: 20 April 1829
- Fate: Sold for breaking up, 7 July 1903.

General characteristics
- Tons burthen: 1,53457/94 bm
- Length: 173 ft 5 1/2 in (52.870 m)
- Beam: 44 ft 10 3/4 in (13.684 m)
- Depth of hold: 14 ft 2 in (4.32 m)
- Sail plan: Full-rigged ship
- Complement: 450
- Armament: Upper deck: 30 × 24-pounder guns; QD & Fc: 16 × 24-pounder carronades + 6 × 24-pounder guns.

HMS President was a large frigate in the British Royal Navy (RN). She was built to replace the previous HMS President, redesignated from the heavy frigate USS President built in 1800 as the last of the original six frigates of the United States Navy under the Naval Act of 1794. The first President had been the active flagship of the U.S. Navy until captured while trying to escape the Royal Navy blockade around New York in 1815 at the end of the War of 1812, and then served in the RN until broken up in 1818. The new British President was built using her American predecessor's exact lines for reference, as a reminder to the United States of the capture of their flagship – a fact driven home by President being assigned as the flagship of the North America and West Indies Station in the western Atlantic Ocean under the command of Admiral Sir George Cockburn (1772–1853), who had directed raids throughout the Chesapeake Bay in 1813–1814 that culminated in the 1814 burning of official buildings in the American capital, Washington, D.C.

The second President was laid down at Portsmouth Dockyard in June 1824 and launched on 20 April 1829; she was completed in 1830 but not commissioned into the Royal Navy until February 1832. The original President of 1800 was originally armed as a spar-decked frigate, however, at the time of her capture and for some years previously she was armed as a conventional frigate. The design of HMS President reflected the 'as captured' armament of the American ship and was completed as a 52-gun frigate with an unarmed spar deck. She was later re-armed with thirty-two 32-pounder guns on the upper deck, and twenty 32-pounder carronades on the quarterdeck and forecastle.

== Service ==
After her first two years' commission on the North America and West Indies Station, she was refitted between February and May 1834. The years 1835–1838 were spent on the South American station. Thereafter she was at Portsmouth for several years before being fitted out as a flagship in 1845 and sent to the Cape of Good Hope for the next two-year commission.

Operations in support of the suppression of the slave trade led to President sending her boats in 1847 to attack an Arab stockade at Anjoxa, Mozambique Channel in East Africa. The fighting, however, was not major.

Returning from South Africa in 1847 to Chatham, she was refitted there in 1853 and sent to the Pacific Station. There she served as flagship until 1857.

Between 11 May and 7 September 1854, when news was received of the declaration of war at the start of the Crimean War in the Black Sea, the British force on the China and Japan station consisted of President, Captain Richard Burridge, HMS Pique, Captain Sir Frederick William Erskine Nicolson, Bart., Captain Charles Frederick, HMS Trincomalee, Captain Wallace Houstoun, and HMS Virago, Commander Edward Marshall, all under Rear-Admiral David Price on President. The French Navy force, under Rear-Admiral Auguste Febvrier-Despointes, consisted of Forte, Eurydice, Artemise, and Obligado. President participated in the Siege of Petropavlovsk and in a number of operations, none of which were carried through to a satisfactory conclusion. During the exchange of fire with the Russian batteries, Price retired to his cabin and shot himself. After suffering heavy casualties in a ground attack, the Allies withdrew, although President and Virago managed to capture and burn the Russian transport Sitka, of 10 guns, and take the small schooner Avatska, laden with stores. The British and French then left the area on 7 September.

== Fate ==
After serving in the Pacific, President was laid up in reserve at Chatham for three years before being converted at Woolwich to an RNR drill ship for service at West India Docks in 1862. President then spent the rest of her life in the London Docks. On 25 March 1903 she was renamed Old President before being finally sold for breaking up on 7 July 1903.
