= Zavoyko =

Zavoyko may refer to:

- Vasily Zavoyko (1809–1898), Russian admiral
- Zavoyko, name of the town of Yelizovo in 1897–1924
