= Vasily Grinevetsky =

Russian professor of engineering

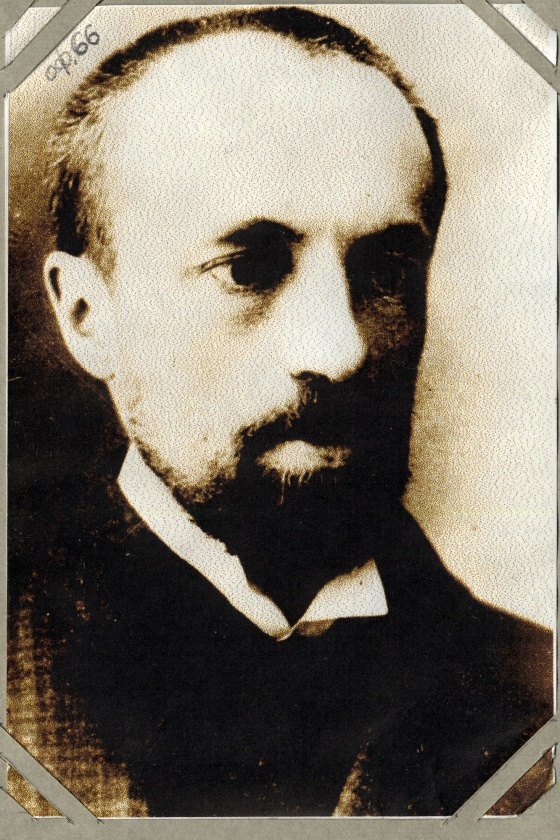
Vasily Grinevetsky

Vasily Ignatievich Grinevetsky (2 June 1871, Kiev, – 31 March 1919) was a professor of engineering at the Imperial Moscow Technical School in the Russian Empire. Along with his colleague, Karl Vasilievich Kirsh, he proposed founding the All-Russia Thermal Engineering Institute, which was eventually founded in 1921.

Grinevetsky was born on 2 June (14th old style) 1871 in Kiev to the family of a railway employee, State Counsellor Ignatii Feliksovich Grinevetsky, who belonged to an old noble family, and his wife Ekaterina Vasilievna, the daughter of Admiral Vasily Zavoyko, who had organised the successful defence of Petropavlovsk, Kamchatka from the Anglo-French fleet during the Crimean War. However his mother died when he was six, and the family moved to Kremenchug, where his father had been reposted. Then the family moved on to Kazan where he then attended Kazan Real School. As a child he developed an interest in machinery, building a working roller mill on his grandmother's estate.

In 1889 he entered the Imperial Moscow Technical School. However, after his father died in 1891, the school came to play a central part in his life. After graduating there he stayed on as a teacher of machine design, becoming an adjunct professor in 1904. In 1914 he was appointed director of the school.
