= Edward Boxer =

British admiral (1784–1855)

Rear-Admiral Edward Boxer
- Born: 1784; Dover, England
- Died: June 4, 1855 (aged 71); Aboard Jason, off Balaklava
- Military career
- Allegiance: United Kingdom
- Branch: Royal Navy
- Service years: 1798–1855
- Rank: Rear-Admiral
- Commands: HMS Sparrowhawk; HMS Hussar; HMS Pique
- Conflicts: French Revolutionary Wars; Napoleonic Wars; Crimean War
- Awards: Companion of The Order of The Bath

Rear-Admiral Edward Boxer CB (27 February 1784 – 4 June 1855) was an English Royal Navy officer who served during the French Revolutionary and Napoleonic Wars.

== Life and career ==
Boxer entered the Royal Navy in July 1798. After eight years' junior service, mostly with Captain Charles Brisbane, and for some short time in the 98-gun HMS Ocean under Lord Collingwood's flagship, he was confirmed as lieutenant of HMS Tigre with Captain Benjamin Hallowell (later Carew) on 8 June 1807. Hallowell was promoted to flag rank in October 1811, and Boxer followed him to HMS Malta and continued under his command until Boxer was confirmed as a commander on 1 March 1815.

In 1822, he commanded the 18-gun HMS Sparrowhawk on the Halifax, Nova Scotia Station in Canada and was posted out of her on 23 June 1823. From 1827 to 1830, he commanded HMS Hussar as flag-captain to Sir Charles Ogle at Halifax.

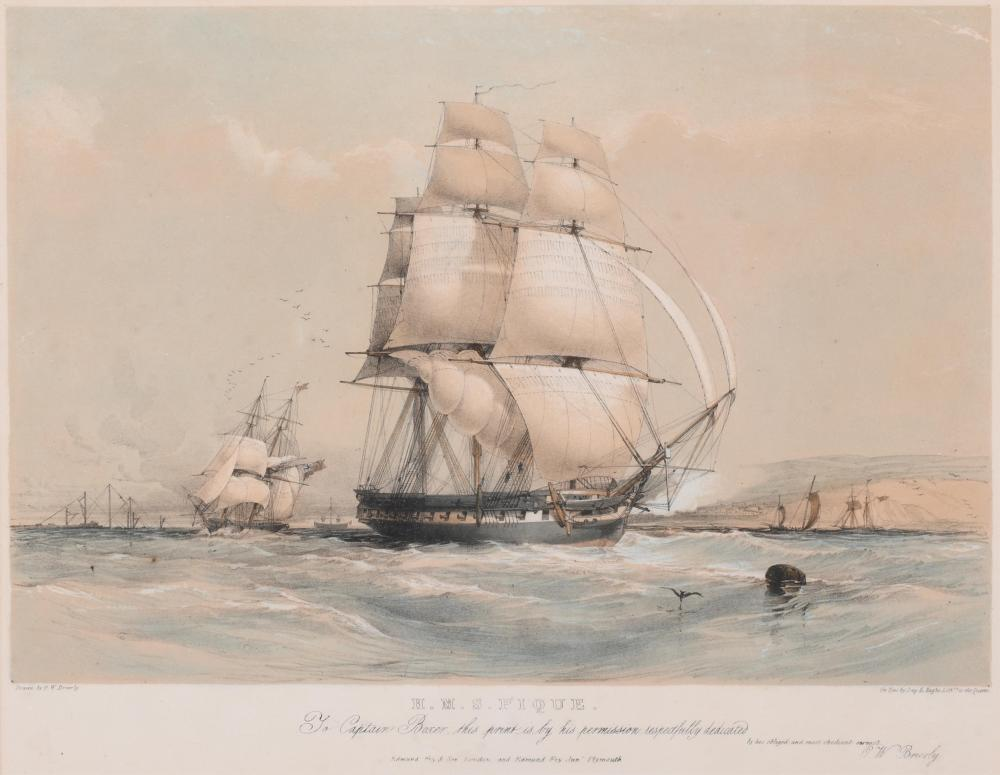
HMS Pique, by Oswald Walters Brierly, a print dedicated to Boxer

In August 1837, Boxer was appointed to HMS Pique, which he commanded on the North American and West Indian stations. Early in 1840s, during the Oriental Crisis, he was sent to the Mediterranean, where he conducted the survey of the position that was consequently occupied by the British fleet off Acre, Israel, which he bombarded. For these actions, he received the Turkish Gold Medal and was made Companion of The Order of The Bath on 18 December 1840. In August 1843, he was appointed harbourmaster at Quebec City, and held that office until his promotion to flag-rank on 5 March 1853.

In December 1854, he was appointed second in command in the Mediterranean, and as a superintendent at Balaklava, which involved responsibility for the inadequate harbour facilities that were heavily used during the Crimean War.

He died of cholera on board the Jason, just outside the Balaklava harbour, on 4 June 1855.

== See also ==
- O'Byrne, William Richard (1849). "Boxer, Edward" . A Naval Biographical Dictionary . John Murray – via Wikisource.

Attribution

This article incorporates text from a publication now in the public domain: "Boxer, Edward". Dictionary of National Biography. London: Smith, Elder & Co. 1885–1900.
