= Vasily Zavoyko =

Russian admiral (1809–1898)

Vasily Stepanovich Zavoyko
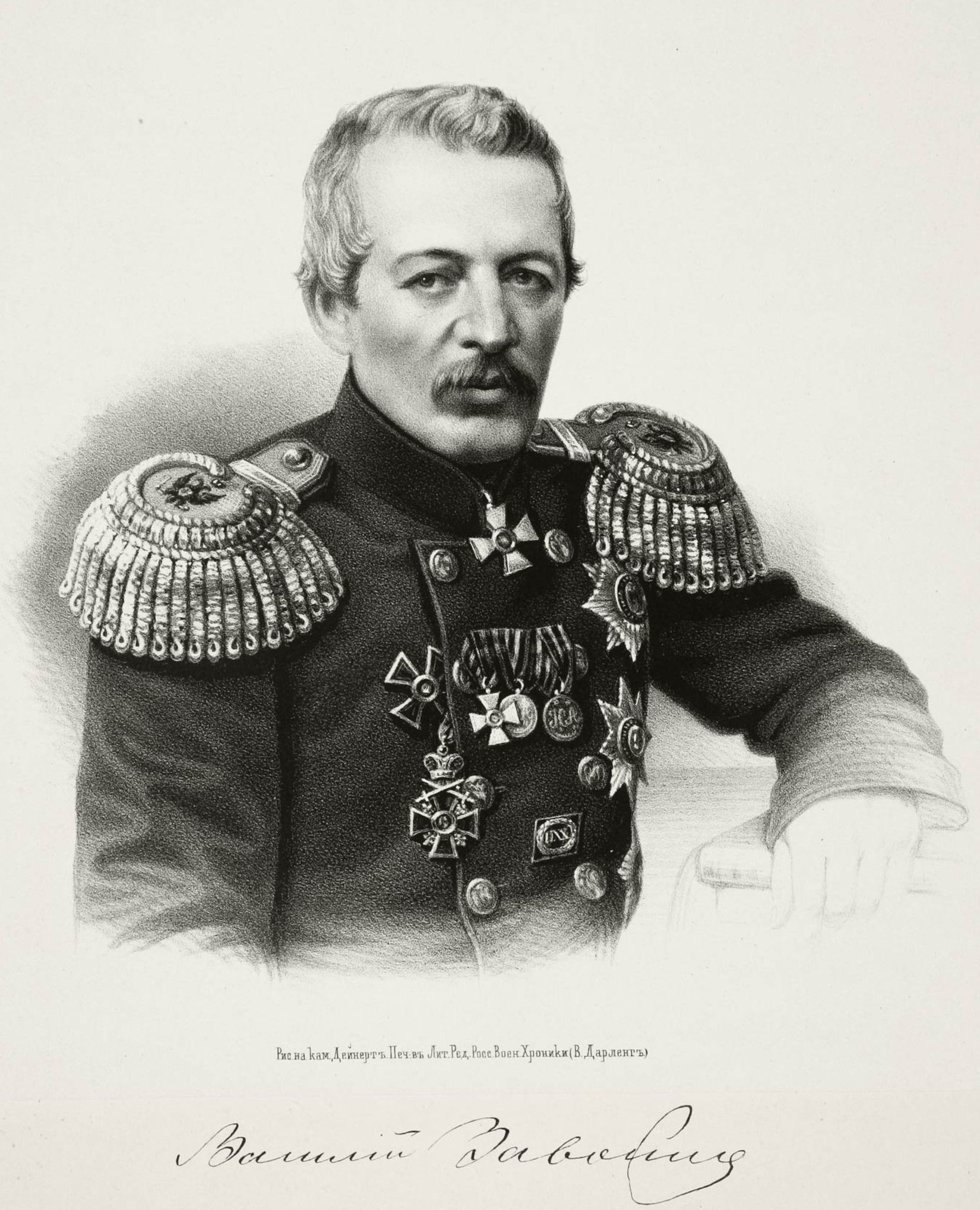
- Vasily Zavoyko
- Born: 27 July 1810; Prokhorovka, Poltava Governorate, Russian Empire
- Died: 28 February 1898 (aged 87); Mechetnaya, Podolia Governorate, Russian Empire
- Military career
- Allegiance: Russian Empire
- Branch: Imperial Russian Navy
- Service years: 1820–1890
- Rank: Admiral
- Conflicts: Greek War of Independence; Battle of Navarino; Crimean War; Siege of Petropavlovsk
- Awards: Order of the White Eagle; Order of St. George

Vasily Stepanovich Zavoyko (Russian: Василий Степанович Завойко; 27 July [O.S. 15 July] 1810 – 28 February [O.S. 16 February] 1898) was an admiral in the Russian navy. Born to a noble Ukrainian family of a naval medic hailed from Poltava Governorate, in 1827 he took part in the Battle of Navarino, and in 1835-1838 he twice circumnavigated the Earth.

In 1840 he became an employee of the Russian-American Company and soon became the manager of the Okhotsk port. He deduced that the port was inconvenient for trade, as it was too far from the Lena River basin and advocated transfer of the Company port to Ayan. During his exploration Zavoyko discovered the estuary of the Amur River (the exploration was later continued by Gennady Nevelskoy, who proved that the Strait of Tartary was not a gulf, but indeed a strait, connected to Amur's estuary by Nevelskoy Strait). Zavoyko's reports about the potential importance of the river led to the 1846 expedition to study Amur and ultimately to the incorporation of the modern Primorsky Krai to Russia (see Amur Annexation).

In 1850, he was appointed governor of Kamchatka and the commander of the port of Petropavlovsk. Under Zavoyko's governorship, Kamchatka expanded to include a wharf, foundry, and a new army barracks. Zavoyko also encouraged agricultural expansion, urging each household to sustain itself with potato farming. These efforts, however, did little to improve the region's low economic and cultural standards.

In 1854, during the Crimean War, Zavoyko led the successful defence against the Siege of Petropavlovsk by the allied British-French troops commanded by Rear Admirals David Price and Auguste Febvrier Despointes. Zavoyko managed to repel the superior allied forces and even captured the British banner.

In the winter of 1855, Zavoyko was in charge of the transfer of the main Russian Pacific naval base from Petropavlovsk to the Amur estuary. The fleet managed to make its way through despite the frozen seas and the superior enemy fleet awaiting them near the Amur inflow. In two months sailors built the Nikolayevsk-on-Amur city that served as the base for the fleet.

In 1856, Zavoyko returned to Saint Petersburg, where he served as the Naval General-Auditor.

He was married to Juliana Wrangell and had 11 children: five sons and six daughters. Zavoyko died in 1898. One daughter, Ekaterina Vasilievna, married Vasily Grinevetsky the professor of engineering at the Imperial Moscow Technical School.

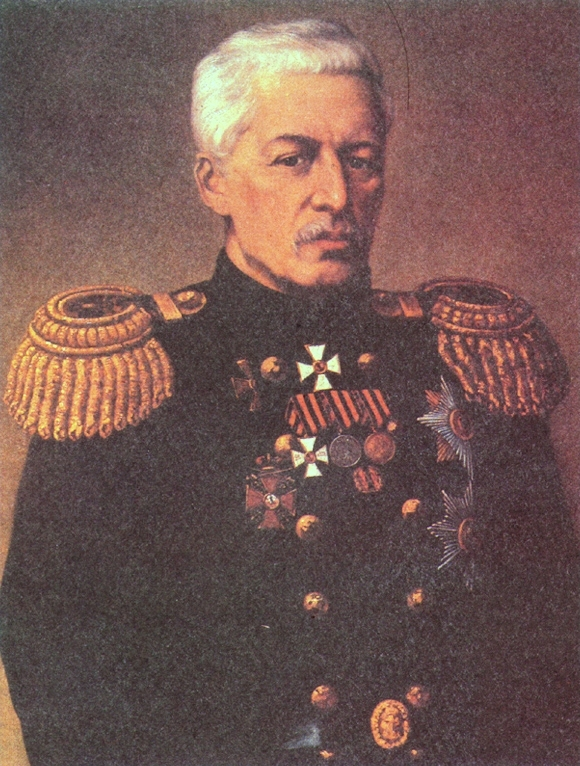
Unknown painter work, 1874

== Awards and honours ==
- Order of Saint Anna "with a bow", 3rd class (1827)
- Silver medal "For the Turkish War"
- Order of Saint Vladimir 4-й ст. (1836)
- Order of Saint Anna, 2nd class (1846)
- Order of Saint Anna, 2nd class "with the imperial crown" (1849)
- Order of St. George, 4th class (November 26, 1850)
- Order of Saint Stanislaus, 1st class (November 27, 1854)
- Order of St. George, 3rd class (December 1, 1854)
- Order of Saint Vladimir, 2nd class (December 12, 1855)
- Order of Saint Anna "with swords", 1st class (May 1, 1864)
- Order of the White Eagle (1884)
- Order of Saint Alexander Nevsky (1890)
- Bronze medal "In memory of the war of 1853-1856" on Ribbon of Saint George
- The badge of distinction for the immaculate service of XXX years
- Honorary Citizen of the city of Petropavlovsk-Kamchatsky
