= Robert Lambert Baynes =

Royal Navy Admiral (1796–1869)

Admiral Sir Robert Baynes KCB
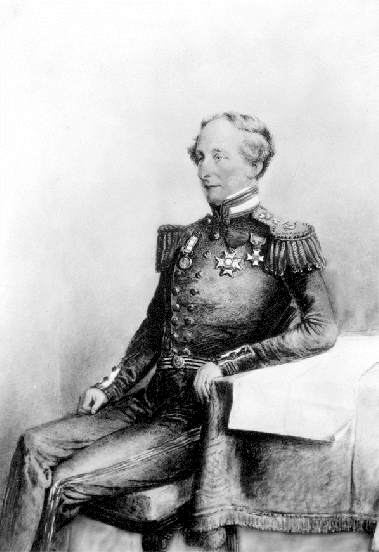
- Rear Admiral Robert Lambert Baynes, 1850s, unknown artist
- Born: 4 September 1796; Millbrook, Hampshire, England
- Died: 7 September 1869 (aged 73); Upper Norwood, England
- Military career
- Allegiance: United Kingdom
- Branch: Royal Navy
- Rank: Admiral
- Commands: HMS Andromache; HMS Bellerophon; Pacific Station
- Conflicts: Greek War of Independence; Crimean War; Pig War
- Awards: Knight Commander of the Order of the Bath

Admiral Sir Robert Lambert Baynes KCB (4 September 1796 – 7 September 1869) was a British Royal Navy admiral who as Commander-in-Chief, Pacific Station helped prevent the 1859 Pig War from escalating to a major conflict between the United States and the United Kingdom. Baynes joined the Royal Navy in 1810 and served in the Napoleonic Wars and the War of 1812. He took part in the Battle of Navarino in 1827 during the Greek War of Independence. He was promoted to captain in 1828 and commanded the vessels HMS Andromache and HMS Bellerophon and served as one of the senior officers in the Baltic Sea during the Crimean War. In 1857, he was made Commander-in-Chief, Pacific Station.

== Early career ==
Baynes was born to Commander Thomas Baynes of the British Royal Navy and Edith in Millbrook, Hampshire. Baynes followed his father and joined the Royal Navy on 19 April 1810 at the age of 14 and was assigned to HMS Blake during the Napoleonic Wars. The ship patrolled off the coast of Catalonia where Baynes served as a midshipman until 1813. From 1813 to 1818, Baynes served in a succession of vessels; HMS Duncan, HMS Royal Sovereign, HMS Tonnant (flagship of Rear Admiral Alexander Cochrane) and HMS Seahorse in which Baynes took part in the Battle of New Orleans during the War of 1812. This was followed by stints aboard HMS Cyrus and HMS Conqueror, flagship of Rear Admiral Robert Plampin.

On 8 April 1818, Baynes was promoted to lieutenant and on 12 April 1819, was assigned to HMS Vigo. On 2 December 1822 he was assigned shore duty at St Helena before joining HMS Briton and HMS Tartarus on the South American station. On 6 October 1826, he was assigned to HMS Asia. On 8 July 1827, he was made the commanding officer of the sloop HMS Alacrity on the Mediterranean Station, but returned to Asia as second captain, which was the flagship of Vice Admiral Edward Codrington.

== Navarino and command ==
Baynes was aboard Asia, the British flagship during the Battle of Navarino on 20 October 1827 during the Greek War of Independence from the Ottoman Empire. A joint British-French-Russian fleet attacked a larger, joint Ottoman-Egyptian fleet in Navarino Bay. Asia led the line of battle and the steady fire by the British-French-Russian fleet led to their victory. Baynes distinguished himself during the battle and was promoted to captain on 8 July 1828. He was also made a companion of the Bath (CB), a knight in the Greek Order of the Redeemer and received two other honours.

As a post-captain, Baynes was not given a command immediately was only assigned to command the 26-gun HMS Andromache on the Cape Station beginning 2 February 1838. He remained aboard the ship until March 1843, after which he was placed on half-pay. On 8 July 1846, he married Frances Denman, the daughter of Lord Denman, Lord Chief Justice. Baynes was reactivated and from 23 September 1847 to 7 November 1850, he commanded HMS Bellerophon a troopship that was assigned first to the Western Station, then the Mediterranean. Baynes was promoted to rear admiral on 7 February 1855 and he was the third in command in the Baltic Sea during the final year of the Crimean War in 1855.

== Pacific Station and final years ==
He was appointed Commander-in-Chief, Pacific Station in on 8 July 1857, with his flag aboard HMS Ganges. Baynes arrived as the gold rush in the British Pacific Northwest was happening and the Royal Navy was expected to enforce the laws enacted by the Governor of the Colony of Vancouver Island, James Douglas. While Baynes was away at Callao, Peru, the San Juan border dispute erupted. On 27 July 1859, United States troops under the command of Brigadier-General William Selby Harney landed on San Juan Island off the Colony of Vancouver Island at the behest of 22 American settlers who claimed to be threatened. The settlers had killed a pig that belonged to the Hudson's Bay Company, and feared British punishment. San Juan Island was British territory, and though the British Ambassador to the United States Lord Lyons initially sought to conquer an American-held island that the British also laid claim to, he ordered Baynes to assist but not to escalate the issue. Douglas also sought military intervention, who demanded the landing of Royal Marines on the island. Baynes refused and his patient handling of the situation led to joint-occupation of the island until a formal decision could be made. In 1872, the British recognized American sovereignty over the island.

After the gold rush and the San Juan dispute, Baynes sought to transfer the headquarters of the Pacific Station to the North Pacific. Esquimalt was Baynes' suggestion in 1859, to which the Admiralty agreed in 1862. On 18 April 1860 he was made a knight commander of the Bath (KCB). He remained Commander-in-Chief, Pacific Station until 1861. He returned to the United Kingdom and never held command again, though he was promoted to vice-admiral of the blue on 5 August 1861. He was made vice admiral of the red in 1863 and admiral in 1865.

Baynes Sound in British Columbia is named for him, and the town of Ganges on Saltspring Island and the waters offshore, Ganges Harbour, are named for his flagship, Ganges. He died in Upper Norwood on 7 September 1869, and was buried at West Norwood Cemetery.

== Sources ==
- Dod, Robert P. (1865). Dod's Peerage, Baronetage, Knightage etc. of Great Britain and Ireland (25th ed.). London: Whitaker and Co.
- Finlay, George (1878). A History of Greece: From Its Conquest By the Romans to the Present Time B.C. 146 to A.D. 1784. Vol. VII. London: Clarendon Press.
- Gough, Barry M. (1976). "Baynes, Sir Robert Lambert". In Halpenny, Francess G. (ed.). Dictionary of Canadian Biography. Vol. IX (1861–1870) (online ed.). University of Toronto Press.
- Jenkins, Brian (2014). Lord Lyons: A Diplomat in an Age of Nationalism and War. Montreal, Quebec & Kingston, Ontario: McGill-Queen's University Press. ISBN 978-0-7735-4409-3.
- Marshall, John (1832). "Baynes, Robert Lambert" . Royal Naval Biography. Vol. 3, part 2. London: Longman and Company. p. 42.
- Neering, Rosemary (2011). The Pig War: The Last Canada–US Border Conflict. Vancouver: Heritage House Publishing Company. ISBN 978-1-926936-01-7.
- O'Byrne, William R. (1849). "Baynes, Robert Lambert" . A Naval Biographical Dictionary. London: John Murray. p. 58.
- Walbran, John T. (1971), British Columbia Place Names, Their Origin and History (Facsimile reprint of 1909 ed.), Vancouver/Toronto: Douglas & McIntyre, ISBN 0-88894-143-9
- Woodhouse, C. M. (1965). The Battle of Navarino. London: Hoddler & Stoughton. OCLC 278453607.

Military offices
Preceded by Sir Henry Bruce	Commander-in-Chief, Pacific Station; 1857–1860	Succeeded by Sir Thomas Maitland
