= David Price (Royal Navy officer) =

British admiral

Rear-Admiral David Price
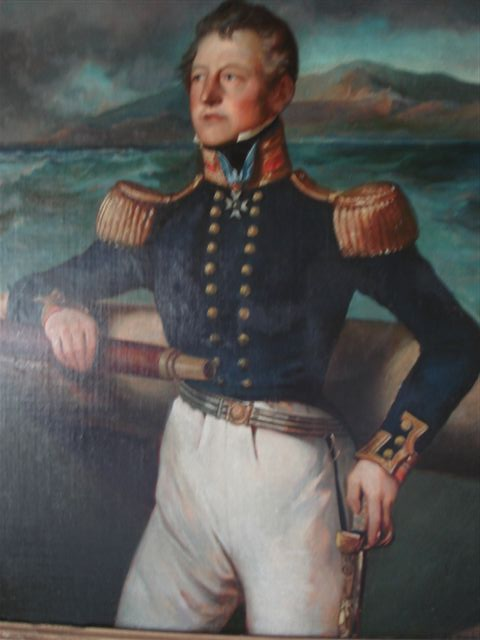
- Rear Admiral Price, c. 1830–1837
- Born: 1790; Cilicum, Wales, Great Britain
- Died: 31 August 1854 (aged 63–64); Off Petropavlovsk-Kamchatsky, Kamchatka, Russia
- Military career
- Allegiance: United Kingdom
- Branch: Royal Navy
- Service years: 1801–1854
- Rank: Rear-admiral
- Commands: Commander-in-Chief, Pacific; HMS Portland; HMS Volcano
- Conflicts: War of the Second Coalition; Battle of Copenhagen; Gunboat War; War of 1812; Crimean War; Siege of Petropavlovsk †
- Awards: Order of the Redeemer (Greece); Sabre from Muhammad Ali of Egypt

Rear-Admiral David Powell Price (1790 – 31 August 1854) was a Royal Navy officer of the 19th century, who served as Commander-in-Chief, Pacific from 1853. He was also known for being a primary commander during the Siege of Petropavlovsk within the Crimean War before allegedly committing suicide before the bombardments of the fort.

== Naval career ==
Joining the Navy on HMS Ardent in 1801, he fought at Copenhagen that year and then in the West Indies on HMS Blenheim when the Peace of Amiens broke down in 1803. He then served in HMS Centaur in 1805 and 1806 under its captain Sir Samuel Hood, fighting in the battle off Rochefort on 25 September 1806 and in its capture of the 50-gun Russian battleship Sevolod on 26 August 1808. He was then appointed acting lieutenant on Ardent in April 1809 and during summer 1809 was captured and released by the Danes twice during the Gunboat War. He was confirmed as lieutenant in September 1809, continuing in Ardent right up to February 1811. He was then transferred to the brig HMS Hawk off France's northern coast, managing to bring out an armed brig and three store ships on 19 August 1811 when Hawk drove a convoy and its escort on shore near Barfleur, though in a later attempt to cut two more brigs out of Barfleur harbour he was severely wounded and unable to serve again for almost a year.

His next appointment was to the 74-gun HMS Mulgrave off Cherbourg, then from September 1812 on HMS San Josef off Toulon (under Henry Bourchier, who had been his captain on Hawk). In December 1812 he gained his first command, the bomb vessel HMS Volcano, with which he sailed for North America in summer 1814 and fought during the War of 1812 on the Potomac, at Baltimore and near New Orleans. He was wounded on 24 December 1814 near New Orleans and saw action the following month, bombarding a fort on the Mississippi as a diversion. At the cessation of hostilities he returned to England, where he was promoted to post rank on 13 June 1815. His next command was HMS Portland (1834–38) in the Mediterranean (receiving the Order of the Redeemer for his services to the Greek government). From 1838 to 1844 he retired to Brecknockshire, serving as a Justice of the Peace there.

In 1844 he married Elizabeth Taylor, daughter of John Taylor and niece of Admiral William Taylor, and in 1846 was promoted to superintendent of Sheerness Dockyard, remaining there until promotion to rear admiral on 6 November 1850 and then to the post of the Royal Navy's Commander-in-Chief, Pacific, in August 1853. Arriving there just before the declaration of the Crimean War, he proved tactful, courteous but indecisive and difficult in his dealings with working with his French colleague Auguste Febvrier Despointes. The French and British fleets slowly advanced across the Pacific, spending a long time at the Marquesas Islands and Honolulu (where the English and French squadrons met in July 1854 and worked to reduce American influence). On 25 July 1854 the combined force sailed to meet two Russian frigates reported to be in the area, finding them dismantled at Petropavlovsk. An attack on them was planned for 31 August 1854 but on that morning Admiral Price was killed by a discharge of his own pistol. Command transferred to Sir Frederick Nicolson, who postponed the attack until 4 September, on which day the Russians decisively beat it back.

N. N. Muravyov wrote in a letter to the admiral-general of the Russian fleet, Grand Duke Konstantin Nikolaevich about the battle in Petropavlovsk:

... the English Admiral Price was killed in front of the Petropavlovsk port on his frigate and was buried in the Tarino Bay ... Zavoiko in vain believed the captive's story that Admiral Price had allegedly shot himself. It was unheard of for a chief to shoot himself at the very beginning of a battle he hoped to win! Admiral Price could not accidentally shoot himself with his pistol. For what need did he take it in his hands, being on a frigate a mile from our battery?

== See also ==
- O'Byrne, William Richard (1849). "Price, David" . A Naval Biographical Dictionary . John Murray – via Wikisource.

Military offices
Preceded by Sir Fairfax Moresby	Commander-in-Chief, Pacific Station; 1853–1854	Succeeded by Sir Henry Bruce
