= HMS Constance (1846) =

Frigate of the Royal Navy

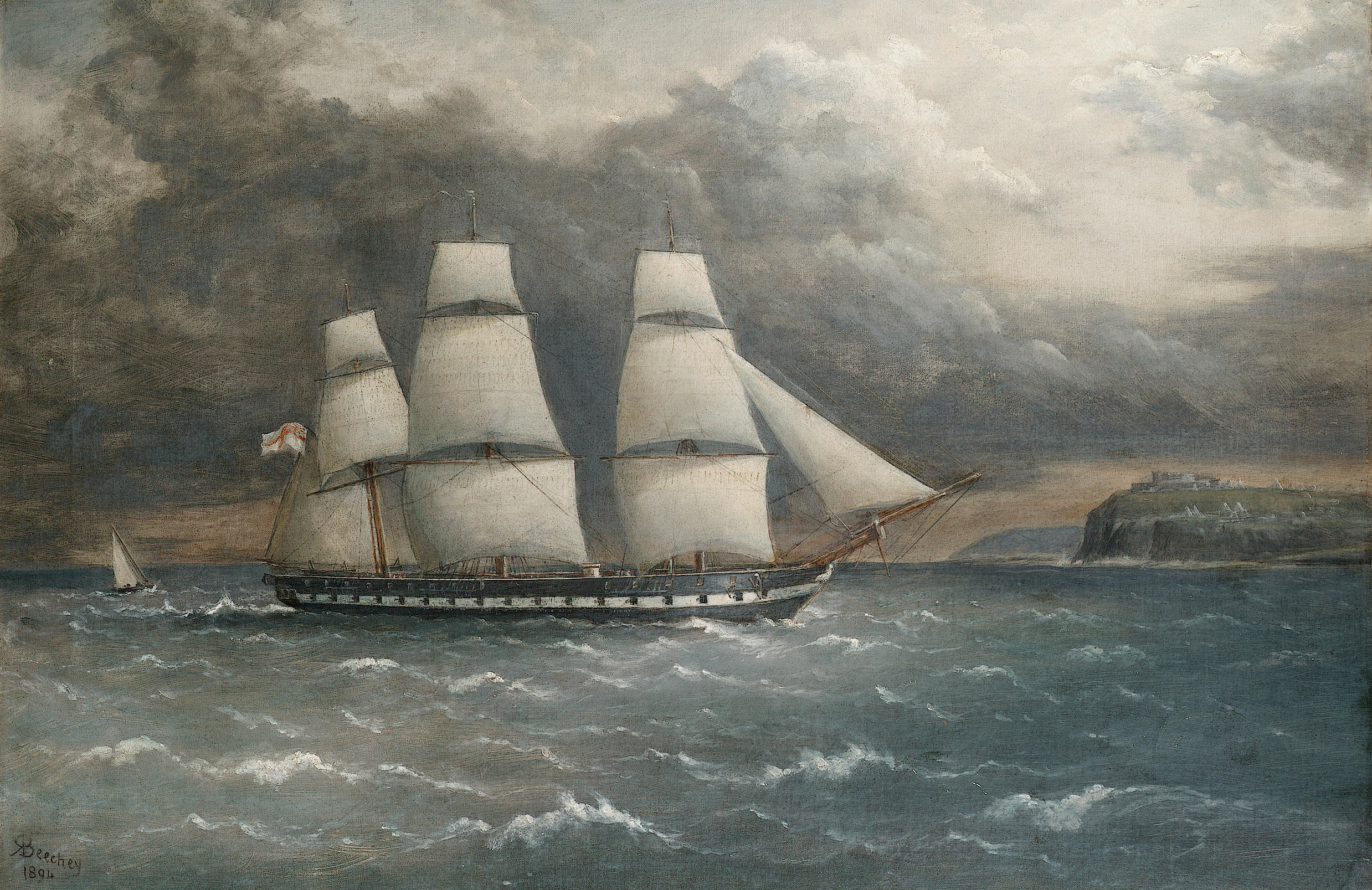
- Constance off Rame Head heading into Plymouth, by Richard Brydges Beechey

History

United Kingdom
- Name: HMS Constance
- Ordered: 31 March 1843
- Builder: Pembroke Dockyard
- Laid down: October 1843
- Launched: 12 May 1846
- Completed: 28 June 1846
- Reclassified: Converted to screw frigate between 1860-62 at Devonport Dockyard
- Refit: 1862
- Fate: Sold for breaking up on 23 January 1875

General characteristics As ordered
- Class & type: 50-gun Constance-class fourth-rate frigate
- Tons burthen: 2,125 75/94 bm
- Length: 180 ft (54.9 m) (overall); 146 ft 10.25 in (44.8 m) (keel)
- Beam: 52 ft 8 in (16.1 m)
- Depth of hold: 16 ft 3 in (4.95 m)
- Propulsion: Sails
- Sail plan: Full-rigged ship
- Complement: 500
- Armament: Upper deck: 28 × 32-pdrs (10 × 8 in/68-pdr shell guns later replaced 10 × 32-pdrs); Quarterdeck: 14 × 32-pdrs; Forecastle: 8 × 32-pdrs

General characteristics After 1860-62 refit
- Class & type: 50-gun fourth-rate frigate
- Displacement: 3,786 tons
- Tons burthen: 3,212 bm
- Length: 253 ft 11 in (77.4 m) (overall); 219 ft 2 in (66.8 m) (keel)
- Beam: 53 ft (16.2 m)
- Draught: 21 ft 1 in (6.43 m) (forward); 23 ft 7 in (7.19 m) (aft)
- Depth of hold: 17 ft 1 in (5.21 m)
- Propulsion: Sails; 6-cyl. compound trunk engine, with surface condensers; 500 nhp; 2,301 ihp = 10.779kts.
- Sail plan: Full-rigged ship

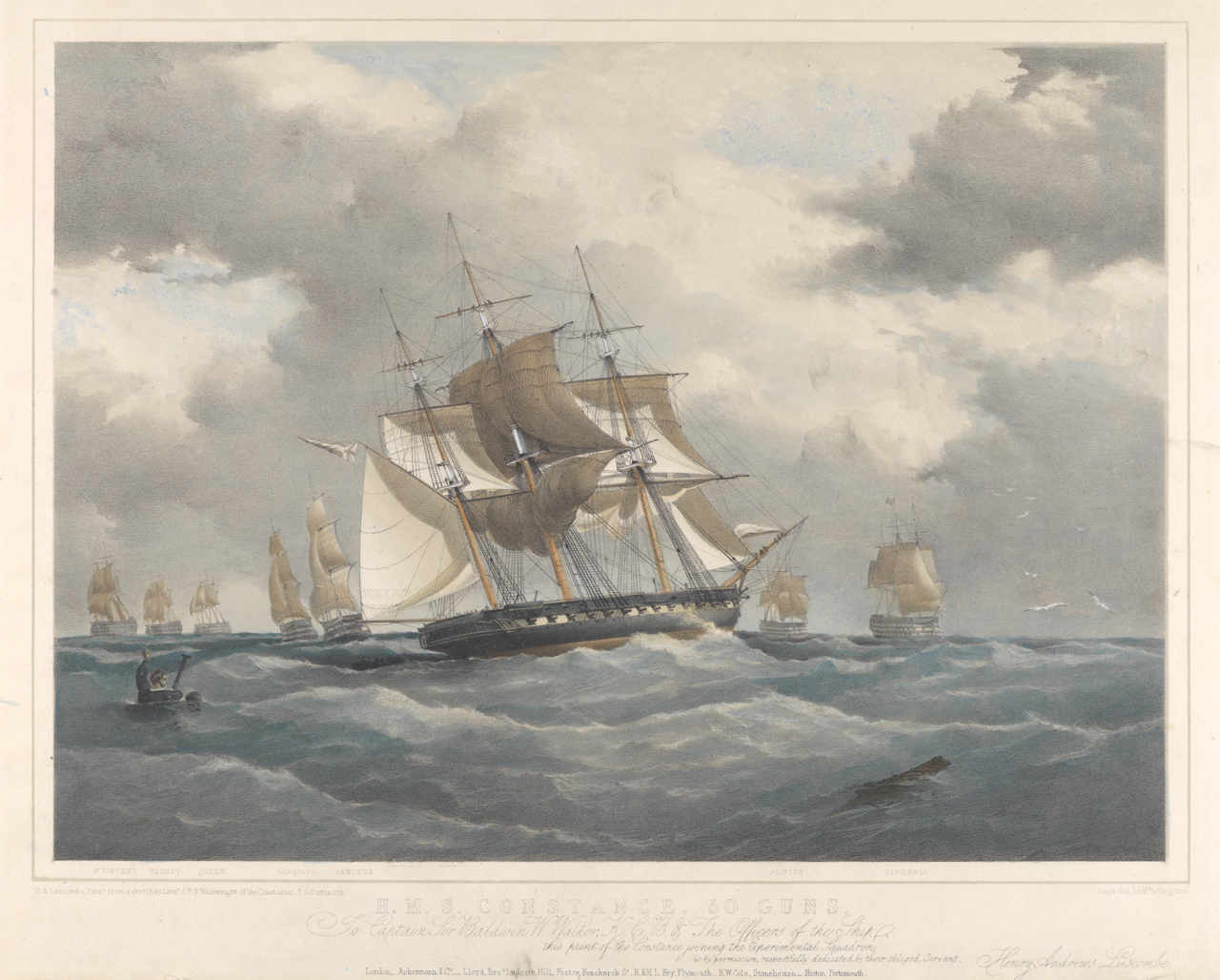
Constance joining the Experimental Squadron, from a sketch by one of her officers' Lieut. J.F.B. Wainwright circa 1846-9

HMS Constance was a 50-gun fourth-rate frigate of the Royal Navy launched on 12 May 1846. She had a tonnage of 2,132 and was designed with a V-shaped hull by Sir William Symonds. She was also one of the last class of frigates designed by him. On her shakedown voyage from England to Valparaíso she rounded Cape Horn in good trim, her captain for this voyage being Sir Baldwin Wake Walker, who commented "I think her a good sea boat, and a fine man of war". On the voyage she encountered a hurricane at 62° south. Walker wrote that "nothing could have exceeded the way she went over it, not even straining a rope yarn". In August 1848, her captain George William Courtenay, for whom the town of Courtenay was named, led 250 sailors and marines from Fort Victoria to try to intimidate the Indians.

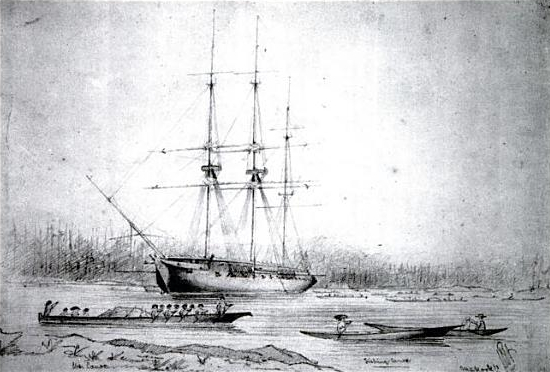
Constance in Esquimalt Harbour 1848, a sketch by John Turnstall Haverfield, a marine on board ship

In 1848, she became the first Royal Naval vessel to use Esquimalt as her base.

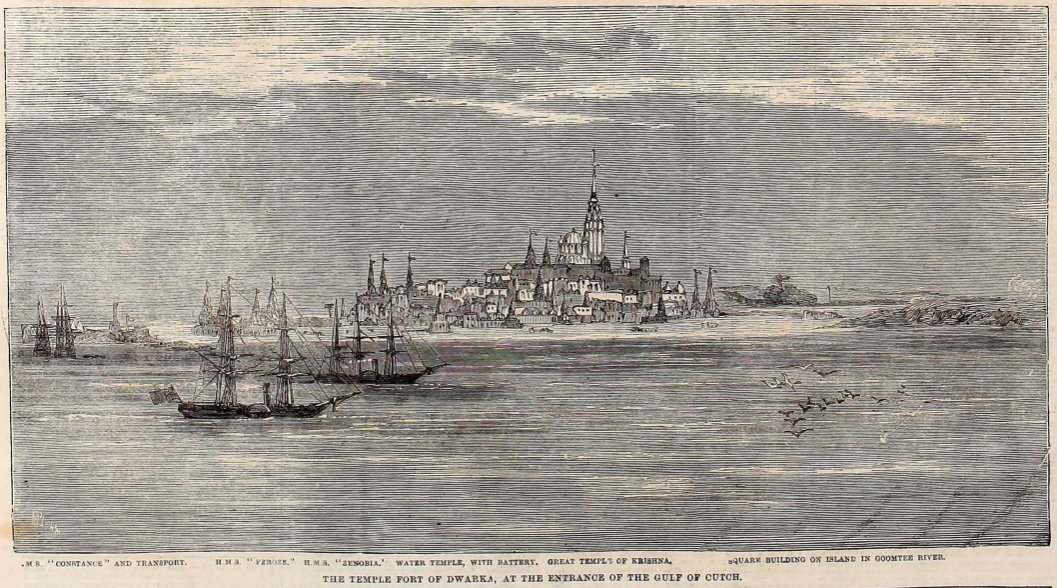
Constance (far left) in operations at "The Temple Fort of Dwarka, at the entrance of the Gulf of Kutch," from the Illustrated London News, 1860

In 1859, she was involved in the bombardment of Dwarka in the state of Gujarat in north western India.

In 1862, she was converted to screw propulsion using a compound steam engine designed by Randolph & Elder. She was the first Royal Naval ship to be fitted with this class of engine, and won a race against two frigates from Plymouth to Madeira in 1865.

Her crew and officers were quarantined aboard whilst berthed at Port Royal on 26 October 1867 during an outbreak of Yellow Fever

== Bibliography ==
- Brock, P. W. & Greenhill, Basil Steam and sail: in Britain and North America: 80 photographs mainly from the National Maritime Museum depicting British and North American naval, merchant, and special purpose vessels of the period of transition from sail to steam Pyne Press, 1973
- Sharp, James A. Memoirs of the life and services of Rear-Admiral Sir William Symonds Longman, Brown, Green, Longmans & Roberts 1858
- Rankine, William John Macquorn Miscellaneous Scientific Papers: From the Transactions and Proceedings of the Royal and Other Scientific and Philosophical Societies Adamant. 4 June 2001. ISBN 978-1-4021-7192-5
- Gardiner, Robert Steam, steel & shellfire: the steam warship, 1815-1905 Conway Maritime Press. 20 June 2001. ISBN 978-0-85177-564-7
- Akrigg, G. P. V. Akrigg, Helen B. British Columbia place names University of British Columbia Press; 3rd edition. 31 December 1997. ISBN 978-0-7748-0637-4
- Gough, Barry M. Gunboat Frontier: British Maritime Authority and Northwest Coast Indians, 1846-1890 University of British Columbia Press. 1st edition. 1 January 1984. ISBN 0-7748-0175-1
- Mariner's mirror The Mariner's mirror, Volume 73 Society for Nautical Research., 1987
- The medical times and gazette John Churchill & Sons. 1867
- The Race The annual of the Royal School of Naval Architecture and Marine Engineering Henry Sotheran & Co. 1871.
- Jones, Colin (1996). "Entente Cordiale, 1865". In McLean, David & Preston, Antony (eds.). Warship 1996. London: Conway Maritime Press. ISBN 0-85177-685-X.
