= HMS Virago (1842) =

British paddle sloop

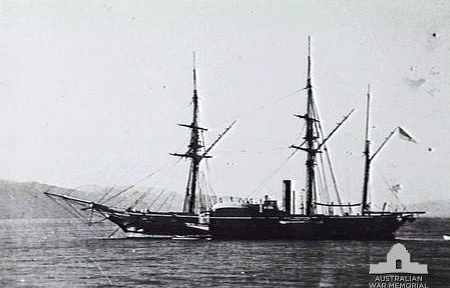
- HMS Virago

History

United Kingdom
- Name: HMS Virago
- Ordered: 18 March 1841
- Builder: Chatham Dockyard
- Laid down: 15 November 1841
- Launched: 25 July 1842
- Commissioned: 29 July 1843
- Fate: Scrapped at Chatham Dockyard in 1876

General characteristics
- Class & type: Driver-class wooden paddle sloop
- Displacement: 1,590 tons
- Tons burthen: 1,055 62/94 bm
- Length: 180 ft (54.9 m)
- Beam: 36 ft (11.0 m)
- Depth of hold: 21 ft (6.4 m)
- Installed power: 300 nhp
- Propulsion: Boulton & Watt 2-cylinder direct-acting steam engine; Paddles
- Sail plan: Brig-rigged
- Complement: 149 (later 160)
- Armament: 2 × 10-inch/42-pounder (84 cwt) pivot guns; 2 × 68-pounder guns (64 cwt); 2 × 42-pounder (22 cwt) guns

HMS Virago was a Royal Navy Driver-class wooden paddle sloop launched on 25 July 1842 from Chatham Dockyard.

She was sent to the Mediterranean Station arriving in November 1843 serving until 1847. Upon returning to England, she was placed into reserve.

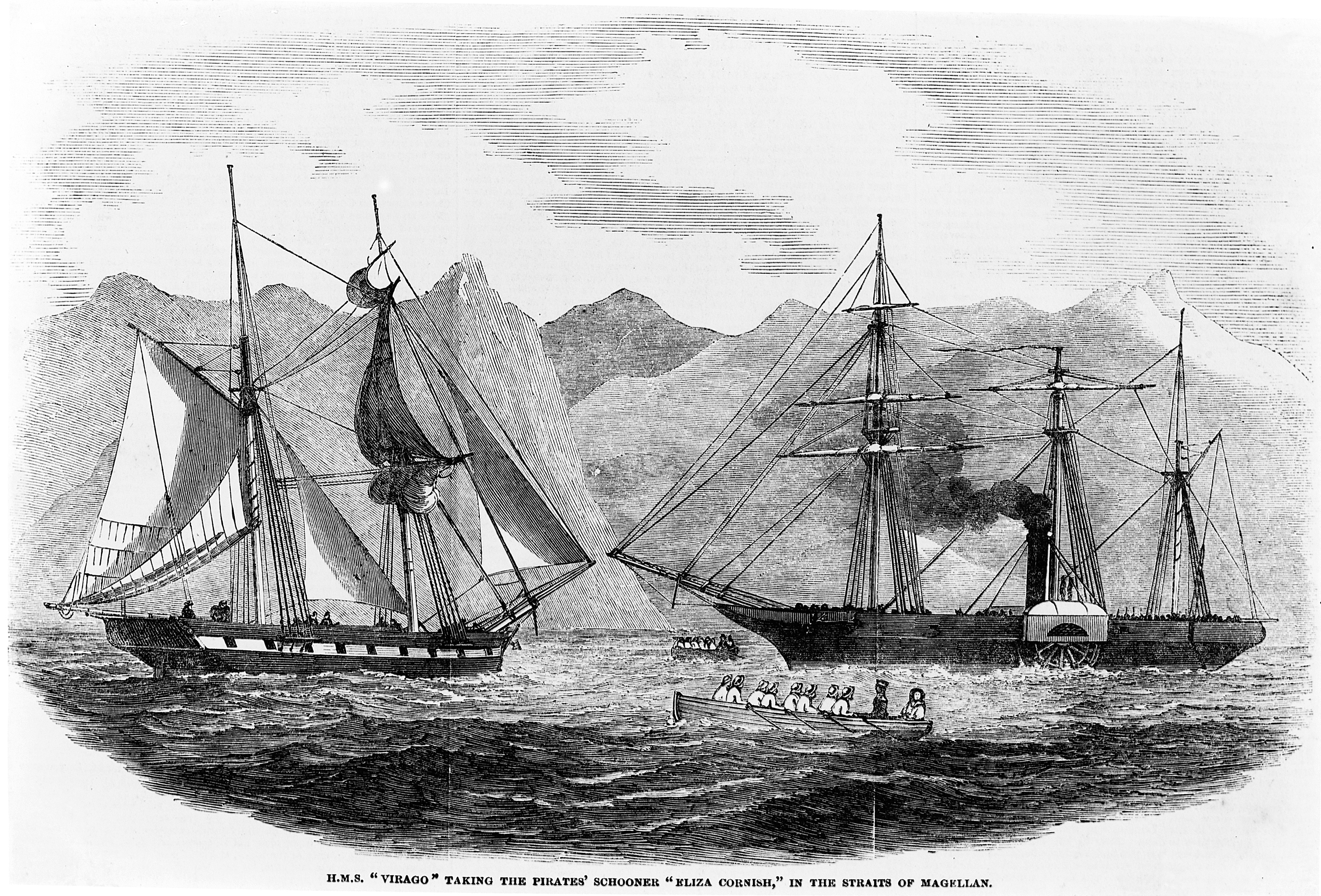
HMS Virago taking pirates' schooner Eliza Cornish in the Straits of Magellan, 1852

In 1851 she was sent to the Pacific Station. Under the command of Commander Willam Stewart, she participated with the assistance of two Chilean ships: Indefatigable and Meteoro in the recapture of Punta Arenas in the Strait of Magellan, which had been subject to a mutiny.

She took part in the siege of Petropavlovsk during the Crimean War in August–September 1854. She also undertook survey work along the Canadian Pacific coast. She returned to England in 1855 and was part of the Channel Squadron and then West Indies Station. On 22 October 1861, Virago ran aground in the East Swin, in the Thames Esturary. Repairs cost £30. She was sent to the Australia Station, arriving in May 1867. She undertook survey work of the Great Barrier Reef, the Queensland coast, Norfolk Island and the coast of New Zealand. While in New Zealand she helped repair HMS Clio, which had run aground in the Bligh Sound.

Returning to England on 28 June 1871, upon arrival she was laid up at Sheerness. She was scrapped at Chatham Dockyard in 1876.
