= HMS Pique (1834) =

Fifth-rate frigate of the Royal Navy

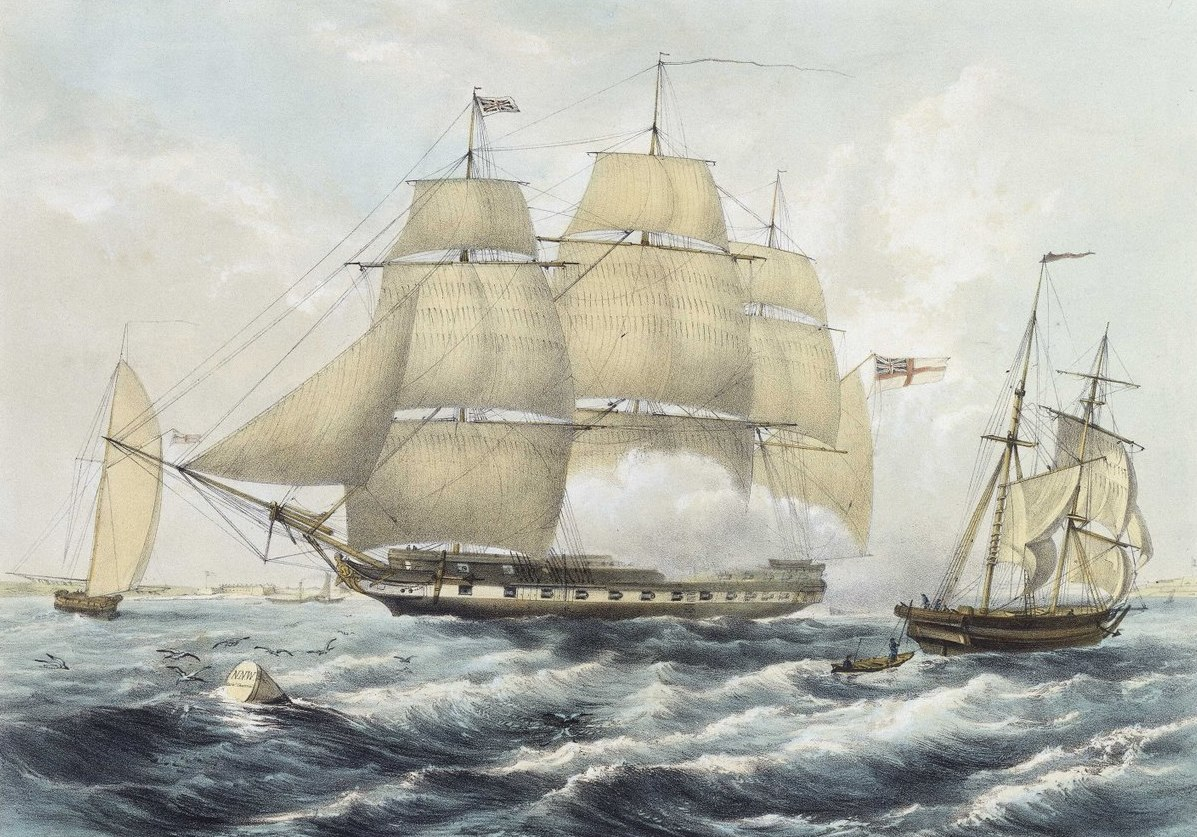
- 1838 illustration of Pique off Portsmouth Harbour

History

United Kingdom
- Name: HMS Pique
- Builder: Devonport
- Launched: 21 July 1834
- Fate: Broken up, 1910

General characteristics
- Class & type: Fifth-rate frigate
- Tons burthen: 1,633 tons
- Length: 160 ft (49 m)
- Beam: 49 ft (15 m)
- Sail plan: Full-rigged ship
- Armament: 36 × 32-pounder guns

HMS Pique was a 36-gun fifth-rate frigate of the Royal Navy. Designed by Sir William Symonds, she was launched on 21 July 1834 at Devonport. Pique was broken up in 1910.

== Service history ==
Pique was the first of a new class of medium-sized frigates designed by Sir William Symonds, Chief Surveyor of the Navy. Following commissioning she formed part of an experimental squadron, which were groups of ships sent out in the 1830s and 1840s to test new techniques of ship design, armament, building and propulsion. In September 1835 she ran ashore in the Strait of Belle Isle. She was refloated and crossed the Atlantic rudderless and taking on water. In October the vessel arrived in Portsmouth for repairs where a large rock, which had plugged the hole in her hull, was removed. This stone remains on display in the Porter's Garden, Portsmouth Historic Dockyard.

Under the command of Captain Edward Boxer (3 August 1837 – August 1841), Pique sailed to North America, the West Indies and the Mediterranean, including operations on the coast of Syria, as part of the squadron led by HMS Cambridge, and including Zebra and Vesuvius. In 1840 Pique participated in bombardment of Acre under the command of Admiral Robert Stopford. For the engagement, Pique was assigned to the far northern end of the line, north-northeast of the much larger HMS Waterloo and at a greater distance from the city than the rest of Stopford's fleet. Despite this unfavourable position, accurate gunnery enabled Pique to score several hits on the town. In 2012 renovation works along Acre's city wall uncovered three cannonballs fired by Pique during the battle, the shots having struck within three metres (9.8 ft) of each other and embedded in the wall at depths of up to 65 centimetres (26 in).

Between 1841 and 1846 Pique served on the North America and West Indies Station. With HMS Blake, in 1845 she acted as a cable ship for experiments in laying telegraph cable in Portsmouth Harbour. From 26 December 1853 she was commanded by Captain Frederick Nicolson on the Pacific Station, and participated in the Crimean War and Second Opium War. Pique was present at the siege of Petropavlovsk. From 1872 she was a receiving ship, and from 1882 rented as a hospital hulk to Plymouth Borough Council to quarantine sailors who had fallen victim to a cholera epidemic.

== Fate ==
Pique was sold for scrap on 12 July 1910, raising £2,300.

== Gallery ==
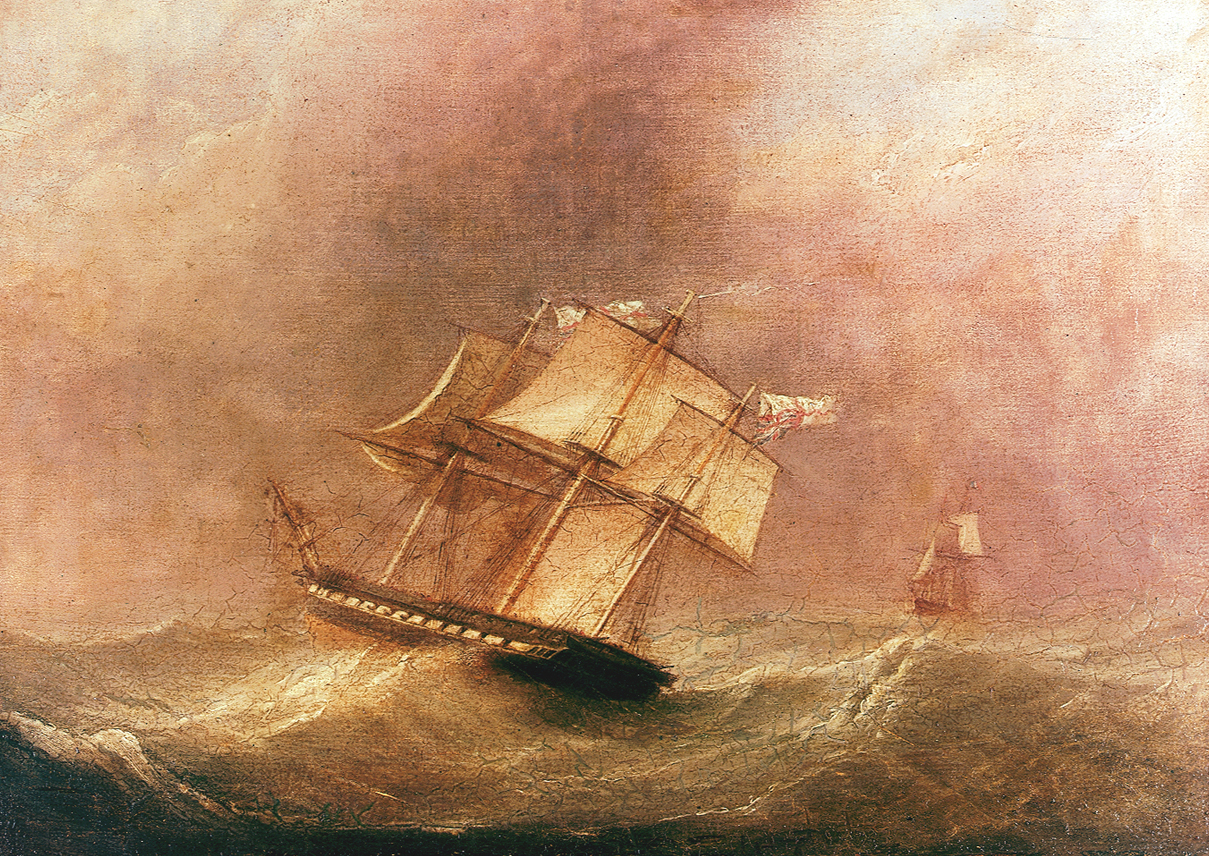
Pique flying her White Ensign inverted as a distress signal while in a gale in the Strait of Belle Isle in September 1835.

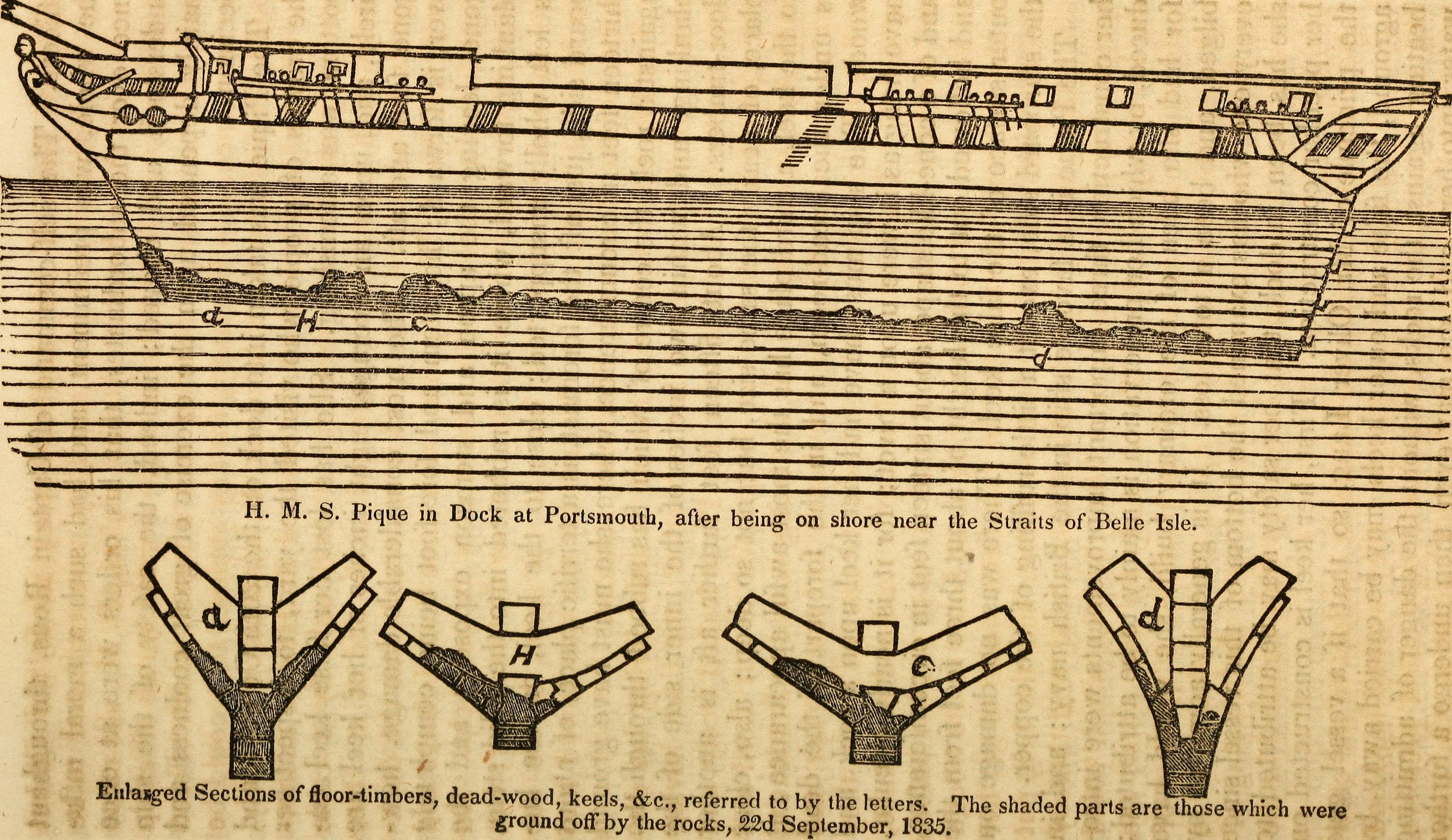
Illustration of the damage Pique's keel sustained in the gale

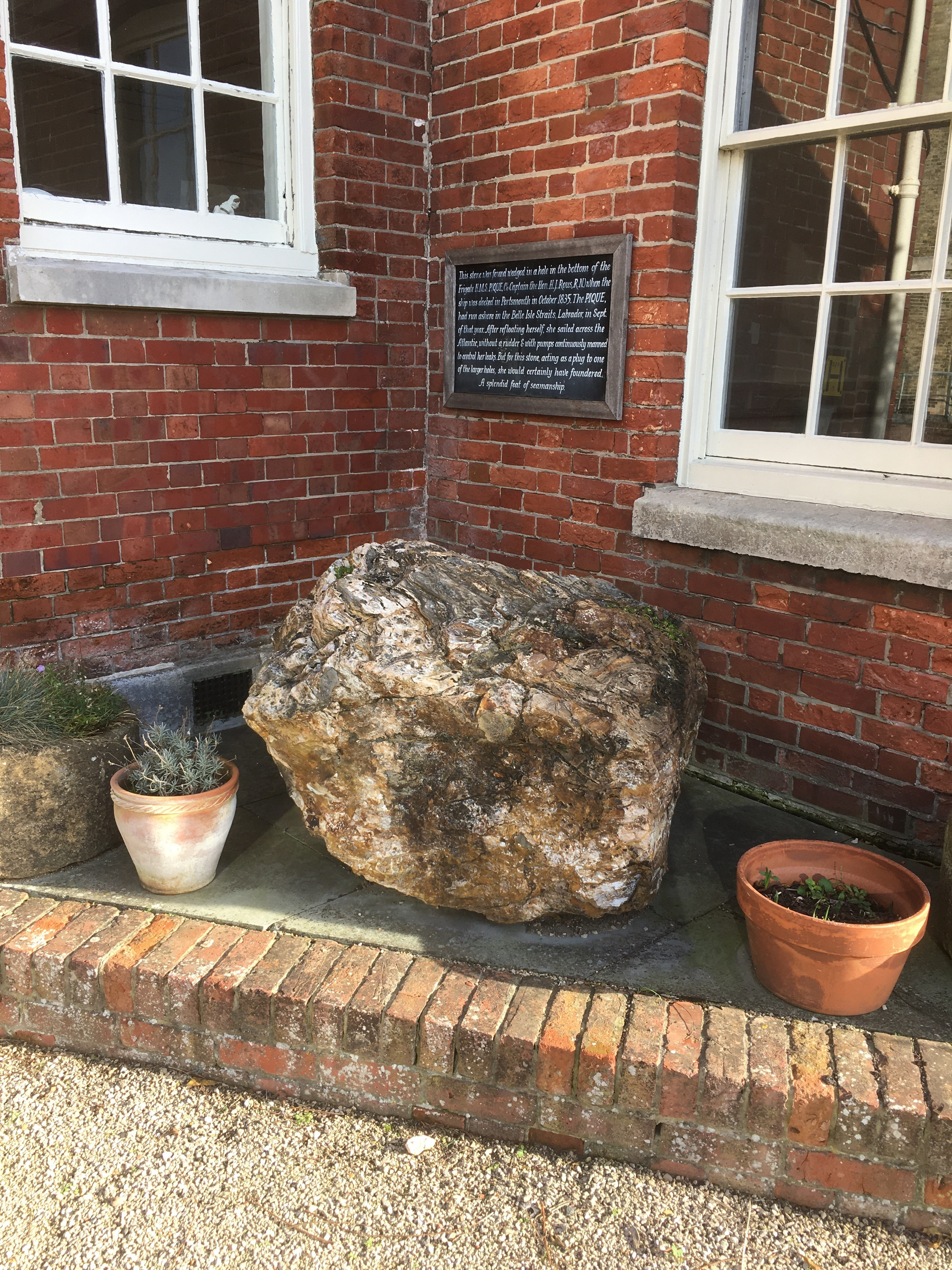
A stone which lodged itself in Pique's hull in October 1835 on display at Portsmouth

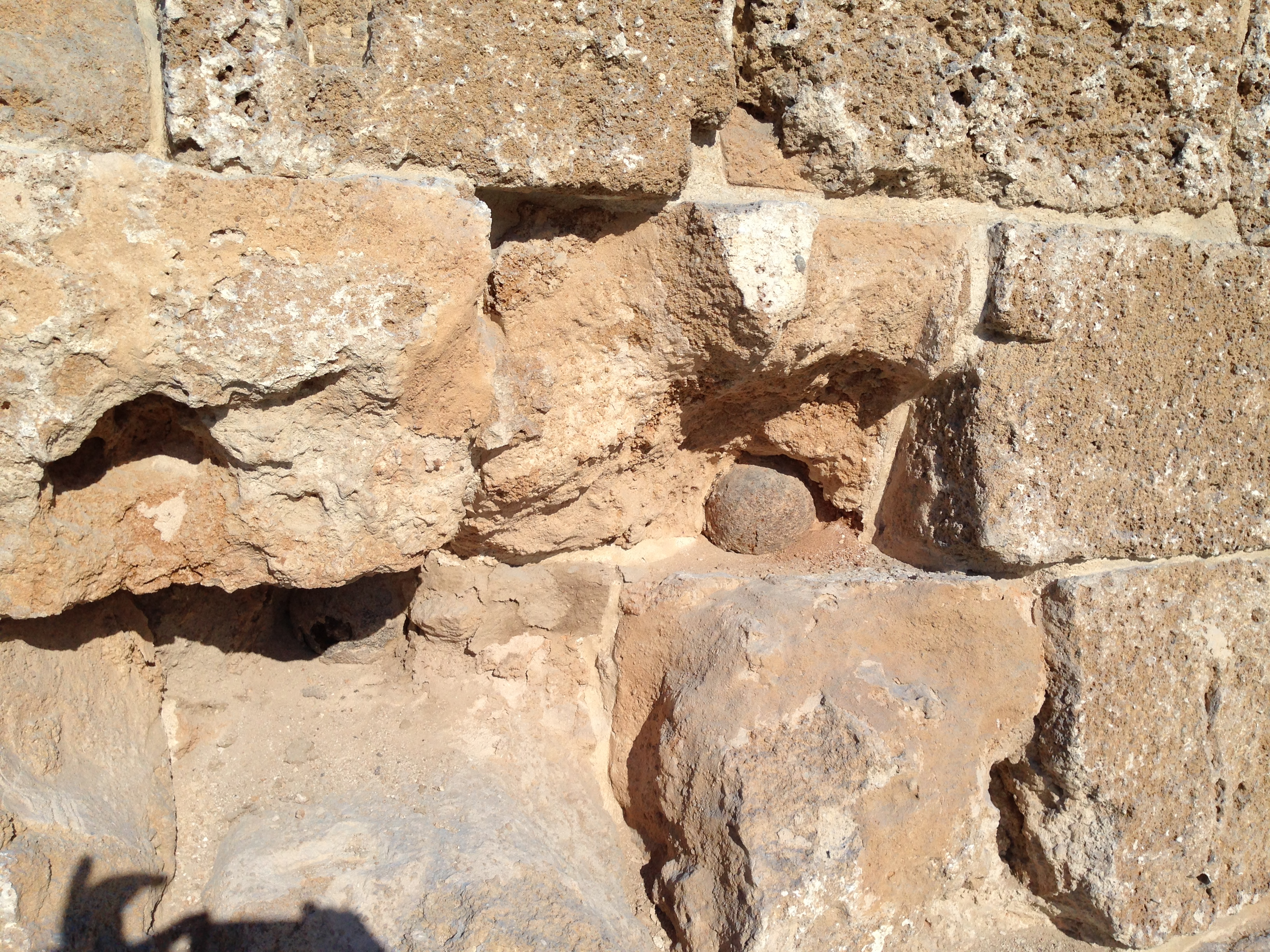
A cannonball fired by Pique on 3 November 1840 during the bombardment of Acre lodged in the Old City of Acre

== Bibliography ==
- Colledge, J. J.; Warlow, Ben (2006) [1969]. Ships of the Royal Navy: The Complete Record of All Fighting Ships of the Royal Navy from the 15th Century to the Present (3rd Rev ed.). London: Chatham Publishing. ISBN 978-1-86176-281-8. OCLC 67375475.
- Kahanov, Yaacov; Stern, Eliezer; Cvikel, Deborah & Me-Bar, Yoav (2014), "Between Shoal and Wall: The naval bombardment of Akko, 1840", The Mariner's Mirror, 100 (2): 147–167, doi:10.1080/00253359.2014.901699, S2CID 110466181
- Lavery, Brian (1983). The Ship of the Line - Volume 1: The development of the battlefleet 1650–1850. ISBN 0-85177-252-8.
