= Siege of Petropavlovsk =

Engagement in the Pacific Theatre of the Crimean War

- Part of the Crimean War
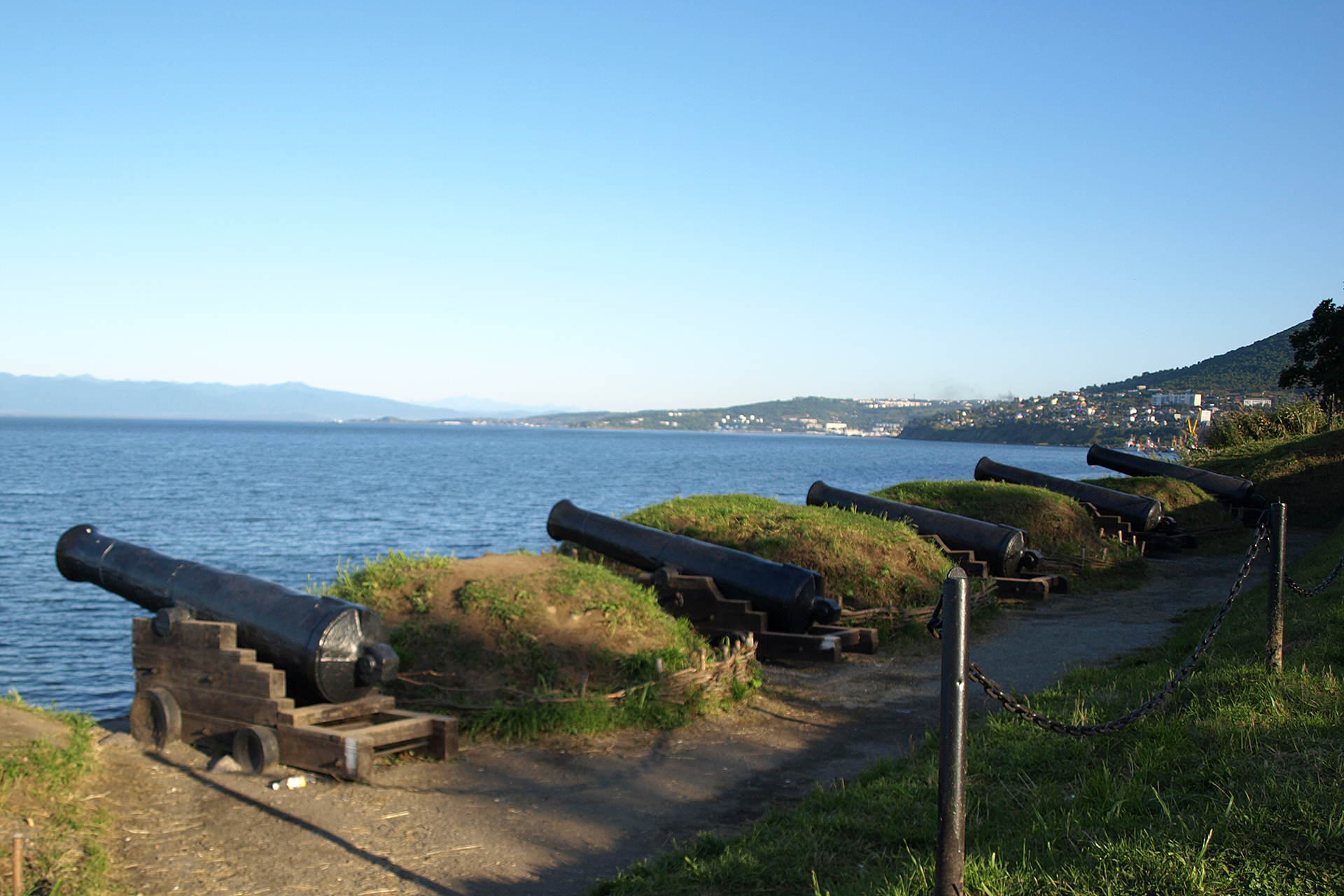
- Cannons which were used to defend Petropavlovsk in 1854
Date	30 August 1854 – 5 September 1854 (NS); 18–24 Aug 1854 (OS)
Location	Petropavlovsk, Kamchatka 53°0′52″N 158°38′30″E
Result	Russian victory

Belligerents
British Empire; France	Russian Empire

Commanders and leaders
(France) Febvrier Despointes (United Kingdom) David Price † (United Kingdom) Frederick Nicolson	(Russia) Vasily Zavoyko (Russia) Yevfimy Putyatin

Strength
6 warships: • 2,600 men (Note: 1,700; 2,600 crew & landing party); • 218 cannons	920–1,013 men (excluding officers); 40 shore cannons 1 frigate Aurora: • 22 guns; 1 transport Dwina: • 5 guns

Casualties and losses
(United Kingdom) : • 26 killed and missing; • 79 wounded.; (France) : • 26 killed and missing; • 78 wounded.; Total (official allied estimates): • 209 casualties.; Russian estimate (United Kingdom) (France) : • up to 400 killed and wounded.; Enemy trophies: • 1 British standard; • 7 officers' sabers; • 56 rifles.	37 killed 78 wounded (115 total); 2 ships: • 1 cargo ship Anadyr; • 1 transport Sitka.

The Siege of Petropavlovsk was a military operation in the Pacific theatre of the Crimean War in which British and French naval forces unsuccessfully attempted to capture the Russian port of Petropavlovsk on the Kamchatka peninsula. The Russian casualties are estimated at 115 soldiers and sailors killed and seriously wounded, whilst the British suffered 105 casualties and the French 104 (by official estimates of the Allies).

== Background ==
The primary concern of the Anglo-French allies was that cruisers of the Russian Siberian flotilla would operate against British and French trade in the area. The British force on the station was under Rear-Admiral David Price (newly promoted after serving as post captain for 39 years) and the French under Rear-Admiral Auguste Febvrier-Despointes. On 9 May 1854 the bulk of the British and French squadrons were at Callao, Peru when they received orders to operate against the Russian cruisers in the Pacific. There were three potential bases for the Russians: the island of Novo-Arkhangelsk, capital of Russian America (modern Alaska), Okhotsk on the Sea of Okhotsk, and the largest Russian settlement on the Pacific Coast, Petropavlovsk on the Kamchatka Peninsula. Given the importance of allied trade with California, two British frigates, Trincomalee and Amphitrite and the French corvette Artémise were detached to cruise off that coast and defend the California trade. The remaining vessels (British frigates President and Pique, the British sloop Virago, the French frigate Forte, the French corvette Eurydice and the French aviso Obligado) set out to hunt down the Russian ships in the Pacific. These six ships were crewed by roughly 1,700 men and mounted 200 guns.

The allied squadron concentrated at Honolulu and on 25 July 1854 set out to hunt down the Russian ships. Their first objective was Novo-Arkhangelsk, which was taken easily but no Russian warships were found. They then set sail for Petropavlovsk.

Russian Vice-Admiral Yevfimiy Putyatin decided he could not meet the allied forces on the open sea, and could not raid allied trade. He had with him only the 44-gun frigate Aurora and Dvina with 10 guns. He decided to concentrate all his available forces at Petropavlovsk, using the Dvina to transfer the Okhotsk garrison to Petropavlovsk. His only other vessel on the station was the 52-gun frigate Pallada, at Imperatorskaya Gavan on the river Amur. Her captain lightened her by offloading all her guns and took her as far upriver as he could to hide from the allies. The winter would destroy the frigate, as the frozen river crushed the ship's hull.

The Russian 54-gun frigate Diana rounded Asia and arrived at Shimoda, Japan with the Russian ambassador in late 1854 to negotiate what would become the Treaty of Shimoda. Diana was severely damaged by tsunamis caused by the Ansei Tokai earthquake on 23 December and sank in a storm soon after, before she could operate against the allies. Her crew would later build the schooner Heda out of the wreck and sailed it to the Amur in 1855.

== Arrival at Petropavlovsk and the first bombardment ==
The allied squadron hove to in Avacha Bay on 28 August 1854. Admiral Price took the steamer Virago forward to reconnoiter. He observed that the Russians had withdrawn their ships behind a heavily fortified spit in the bay. He decided to mount a direct bombardment against the "eleven gun battery" (Battery No. 2), the main heavy earthwork defending the spit and the ships within. The next day (29th) the Virago and the President mounted a reconnaissance-in-force against the central position, exchanging fire with the batteries to gauge their strength. That evening Price held a council of war and announced his plan. The attack would be broken into two phases; initially they would reduce Fort Shackoff (Battery no. 1) whilst staying out of the arcs of the Russian ships and Battery no. 2, and then they would edge around "the corner" of the spit to engage first Battery no. 2 and then the Aurora in detail. Meanwhile, the lighter vessels would suppress the other batteries.

30 August was windless and the Virago had to tow the sailing vessels into place. With the movement underway to place the attackers in bombardment positions Admiral Price suffered a fatal gunshot wound in his cabin, possibly self-inflicted. With the chain of command in doubt, Captain Nicholson of the Pique ordered a delay of 24 hours.

On 31 August, Price's plan was put into effect. The President suppressed Battery no. 1, Forte Battery no. 2 and the Virago and Pique Battery no. 4. Batteries no. 1 and 4 were effectively suppressed and small Royal Navy landing party took possession and spiked the guns of Battery no. 4. The main force then moved against Battery no. 2. Fire from the frigates President and Forte easily suppressed Battery no. 2 and caused a great deal of damage to the Aurora, rendering her unseaworthy until more than six months' repairs were effected. The Virago took a large hole below the waterline from a Russian shell, but this was quickly plugged. However the French frigate Forte signaled that it wished to withdraw, and so the Virago towed her beyond the Russian range. The remaining allied ships thus disengaged.

== Second bombardment and repulse of the landing force ==
On 1 September the Virago was despatched to bury Admiral Price on the other side of the bay. There they encountered four American whalers living in a tent who told them that the port was vulnerable to an attack from the landward side, with a path through the woods of Nikalski Hill that would allow light artillery to crest the hill. Meanwhile, the French commander, Admiral Febvrier-Despointes, and the British commander, Captain Nicholson, were engaged in a fierce argument. Despointes wanted to retreat, whereas Nicholson was more bellicose, correctly believing that the Russians had expended most of their ammunition and that one more push would overwhelm the defenders. Since Despointes refused to place his ships back under enemy fire Nicholson took the report of the Americans and proposed a landing, with the ships suppressing the enemy batteries and a force of roughly 700 men landing near Battery no. 6 to attack two objectives; one group would occupy the top of Nikalski Hill and bring up boat howitzers to destroy the Aurora, whilst the other group would fight through the town to occupy Battery no. 5 and then onto Battery no. 2. The matter was put to a vote, and all the British Captains voted to attack, and two of the French Captains voted not to with de la Grandière of the Eurydice abstaining. The deciding vote was cast by Febvrier-Despointes, who did not wish to make the attack but feared the French being labelled cowards, especially given the premature flight of the Forte and the refusal of the Eurydice to engage the enemy a few days before. He abstained, leaving the vote 3–2 in favour of the attack.

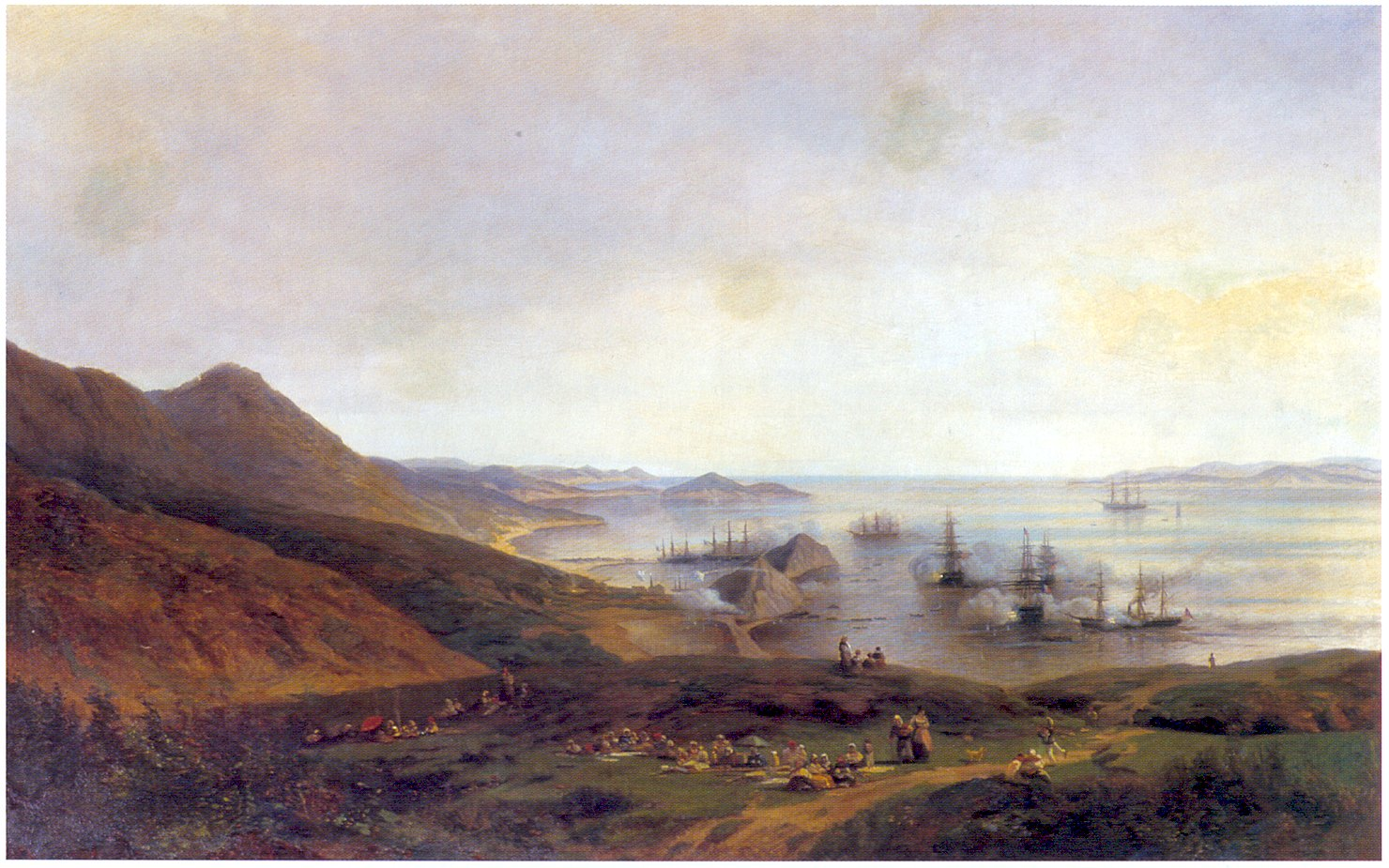
Siege of Petropavlovsk (Alexey Bogolyubov)

The attackers were placed aboard the Virago, which towed the President, Forte and the ships boats towards Battery no. 6. The assault group consisted of:

- French naval column (200 French sailors from Forte and Eurydice under Captain de la Grandière) – tasked to bring artillery up the hill from the north
- Marine column (120 British and 80 French Marines under Captain Parker, Royal Marines with Lieutenant-Commander de Lacombe commanding the French portion) – tasked to seize the crest of the hill for the artillery from the north
- British naval column (180 British sailors from President and Pique under Captain Burridge) – tasked with seizing and destroying Battery no. 5 and advancing into the town and turning to attack the hill from the east
- Mixed naval column (120 British and French sailors from Virago and Obligado under Enseigne de Vaisseau van Echut of the Obligado) – tasked with leaving a detachment to defend the beach and the landing craft and then advance along the beach and attack the hill from the west

The Petropavlovsk garrison, after the casualties sustained on 31 August, was reduced to 41 officers, 476 soldiers, 349 seamen, 18 Russian volunteers and 36 Kamchadals (total 920 men). The soldiers were detachments of the 12th, 13th and 14th Siberian line battalions, and a sotnia of mounted cossacks.

The President and Forte successfully suppressed Batteries no. 2 and 3 in half an hour of firing (7:30–8:00) and the troops were landed in two waves at 8:15 and 8:30 (the two British commanded columns first). On landing the 120 Royal Marines under Parker immediately formed line and advanced up the hill in extended order (followed closely by the French marines), and the British naval column under Burridge immediately formed up and successfully assaulted Battery no. 5, destroying it with a keg of powder brought for the purpose. By 0830 hrs the two British columns had achieved their objectives and the second wave was landing. However de la Grandière could not locate the supposed path which would allow him to move artillery up the hill, and remained on the beach, attempting to recall the British columns.

By 8:45 the British and French Marines had secured the crest of the hill, and Burridge's column had advanced into the town and had engaged the open backs of Batteries no. 2 and 3. Captaine de la Grandière tried to recall the Marines, and took another 45 minutes to advance his column up the hill. Meanwhile, van Echut's small party advanced up the beach but came under a very destructive fire from the hill and were driven back. The Marines for their part continued to advance until they ran into well dug in entrenchments manned by riflemen and a battery of field artillery which showered them with canister and grape. They went to ground and started sniping the gunners and any riflemen they could see. Their officers were all killed trying to get the marines to charge. The French naval column finally advanced to their support, but when they reached the top of the hill the French sailors mistook the red jackets of the Royal Marines for the red shirts of the Russian Navy and began a firefight with them.

The firefight on the hill lasted around 90 minutes, with the Russians being reinforced by several hundred sailors from Battery No. 2 and the town. Around 1045 hours de la Grandière ordered a retreat, and Burridge's column, having climbed the northeastern slope of the hill, formed a rearguard with the French artillery at the top of the gorge. The broken remnants of the Marines and French sailors streamed past Burridge's, hotly pursued by Russian infantry, Cossacks and sailors at bayonet point. Burridge's force halted the Russian pursuit but the attack was a failure. Withdrawing to the beach the landing parties boarded their boats to return to their ships. However further casualties were incurred as Russian riflemen on the heights above found easy targets and slaughtered the landing parties. In the process the Royal Marines colour was lost, as it fell overboard when the colour bearer was shot.

The allies left 52 dead and wounded behind (26 British and 26 French). The Russians captured seven officers' swords and a quantity of firearms, swords, and bayonets, and found the Royal Marine colour washed up on the beach the next day.

The Allies withdrew, although President and Virago managed to capture the Russian Anadyr, a small schooner, and the 10-gun transport Sitka on 28 September 1854. The Allies left Petropavlovsk to the Russians until April 1855, when Nikolay Muravyov, aware of the insufficiency of troops and weapons to repel another attack on the city, had the Petropavlovsk garrison evacuated under the cover of snow.

The Allied fleet retreated to the Colony of Vancouver Island and the French to San Francisco. They regrouped and returned in the spring to find the Aurora had sailed.

== Casualties ==
The British and French suffered 209 casualties in the campaign to all causes, including Price's suicide. The British suffered 26 killed and missing, and 79 wounded to various degrees. The French suffered 26 killed and missing and 78 wounded. Some of these casualties were quite minor, and some not due to enemy action. For example, the casualties in the British landing columns were all sent to HMS President, whose surgeon notes:

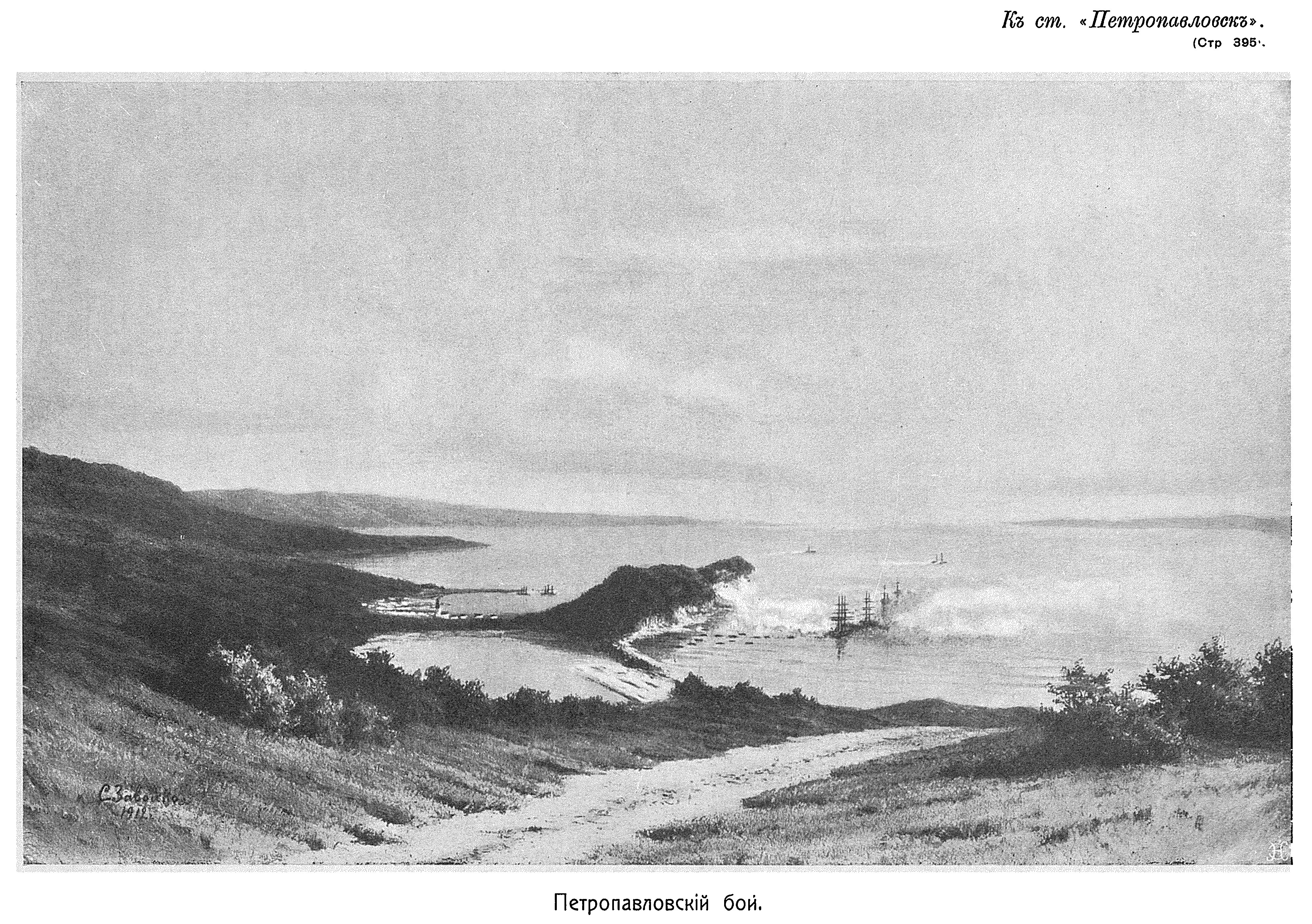
Siege of Petropavlovsk

- 10 Killed or missing (left behind)
- 27 Wounded by gunshot wounds (from minor wounds to mortal ones)
- 2 Bayonet wounds
- 1 Cutlass wound
- 7 Bruised by falling stones scrambling up the hill or falls
- 1 Burnt by a premature musket flash

He notes the President had 9 killed and wounded by shot and wooden splinters during the bombardments (of which 3 killed and 6 wounded), some of whom were on loan from other ships (since President gave 190 men to the landings).

The official reports of casualties (and the reports of the commanders) were published. Broken down by ship:

- President: 11 killed or missing, 2 dangerously wounded, 28 severely bruised and 9 slightly wounded,
- Pique: 12 killed or missing, 7 dangerously wounded, 11 severely bruised and 9 slightly wounded,
- Virago: 3 killed or missing, 3 dangerously wounded, 3 severely bruised and 8 slightly wounded,
- Forte: 11 killed or missing, 18 dangerously wounded and 10 slightly wounded/ bruised (Forte was the only ship to take casualties in the first bombardment),
- Eurydice: 8 killed or missing, 11 dangerously wounded and 10 slightly wounded/ bruised,
- Obligado: 7 killed or missing, 10 dangerously wounded and 18 slightly wounded/ bruised,

Total of 52 killed or missing, 93 severely injured, and 64 minor injuries

The Russians suffered 37 dead and 78 seriously wounded; minor injuries were generally not reported.

== Allied fleet ==
British

The British force in the September 1854 operations was under Rear-Admiral David Price, and consisted of:

- HMS President, 50-gun frigate (flagship), Captain Richard Burridge, 450 men,
- HMS Pique, 40, fifth-rate frigate, Captain Sir Frederick William Erskine Nicolson, Bart., 280 men,
- HMS Virago, 6, paddle steamer, Commander Edward Marshall, 149 men

French

The French Rear-Admiral Auguste Febvrier-Despointes had at his disposal:

- Forte, 60 (flagship), Captain de Miniac, 513 men,
- Eurydice, 30, Captain de la Grandière, 229 men,
- Obligado, 14, Captain de Rosencoat, 125 men.

== Gallery ==
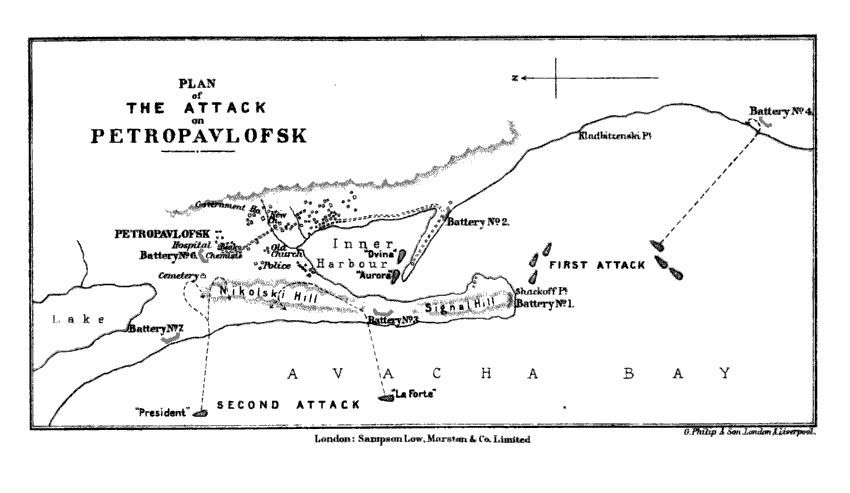
A map of the Franco-British attack on Petropavlovsk (Kamchatka) in 1854

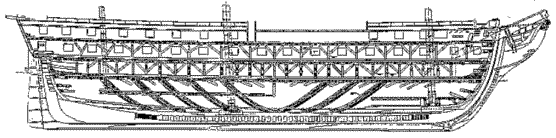
HMS President – built to the plans of the American USS President

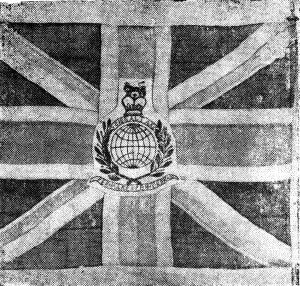
The Royal Marine colour found washed up on the beach after the battle

== Sources ==
- Du-Hailly E. Une campagne dans l'Ocean Pacificue//Revue de deux Mondes, 1858, t. XVI, p. 686–718; t. XVII, p. 169–198. (fr.)
- M.A. Sergeyev. Defense of Petropavlovsk-on-the-Kamchatka. 3rd ed. Moscow, 1954.
- Chapter in the Crimean War, by Yevgeny Tarle.
- W.L. Clowes on the 1854–56 Russian War
- HMS Trincomalee – Royal Navy Service
- Russia on the Pacific and the Siberian railway By Vladimir, Zenone Volpicelli, S. Low, 1899 pp. 218–224
- Hugh Turner (Editor) – HMS Trincomalee from the Quarterdeck – a Second Helping, Friends of HMS Trincomalee 2014, Kindle e-book ASIN B00OWH9O0E
- Velichko, Konstantin I.; Novitsky, Vasily F.; Schwarz, Aleksey V. von; Apushkin, Vladimir A.; Schoultz, Gustav K. von (1915). Военная энциклопедия Сытина [Sytin Military Encyclopedia] (in Russian). Vol. XVIII: Паукер – Порт-Артур. Moscow: Типография Т-ва И. Д. Сытина. pp. 395–397.
- Tashlykov, S. L. (2016). "ПЕТРОПАВЛОВСКА ОБОРОНА 1854". Great Russian Encyclopedia. Electronic version.
