= Auguste Febvrier Despointes =

19th-century French naval officer and colonial administrator

Auguste Febvrier-Despointes
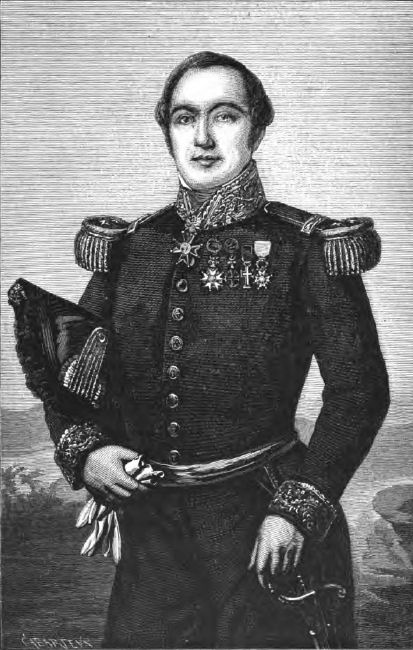
- Born: 1796; Le Vauclin, Martinique, France
- Died: 5 March 1855 (aged 58–59); Pacific Ocean, off the coast of Peru
- Relatives: Anne Élisabeth Papin-Thévigné (wife)
- Military career
- Allegiance: First French Empire; Bourbon Restoration (France) July Monarchy; French Second Republic; Second French Empire
- Branch: French Navy
- Service years: 1811–1855
- Rank: Counter admiral (contre-amiral)
- Conflicts: Crimean War: Siege of Petropavlovsk

Auguste Febvrier-Despointes (French pronunciation: [oɡyst fɛvʁije depwɛ̃t]; 1796 – 5 March 1855) was a French counter admiral. He served as the first commandant of New Caledonia from 24 September 1853 to 1 January 1854.

== Life ==
Despointes entered the French Navy school at Brest in September 1811 and in 1844 married Anne Élisabeth Papin-Thévigné—who had previously been married to Joseph Le Normand de Morando—and was the great-grandmother of Count Pierre de Polignac. He was promoted to commander on 10 December 1850 and contre-amiral on 2 April 1851, he became major general of the fleet at Brest and then, in 1852, rose to commander of France's naval division in Oceania and the west American coast. He officially took possession of New Caledonia in the name of France on 24 September 1853 before taking part in the far eastern theatre of the Crimean War in 1854, including the siege of Petropavlovsk. He then fell ill, dying on board his ship in 1855; his body was returned to France in 1856.
