= Henry Bruce =

Henry Bruce may refer to:

- Henry Bruce (Royal Navy officer, born 1792) (1792–1863), British admiral
- Henry Bruce, 1st Baron Aberdare (1815–1895), British statesman
- Henry Bruce, 2nd Baron Aberdare (1851–1929), his son
- Sir Henry Bruce (Royal Navy officer) (1862–1948), British admiral
- Henry Bruce (Australian politician) (1884–1958), Queensland and Federal Australian politician
- Henry Brudenell-Bruce, 5th Marquess of Ailesbury (1842–1911), British soldier and politician
- Sir Henry Bruce, 3rd Baronet (1820–1907), Member of Parliament for Coleraine 1862–1874 and 1880–1885
- Sir Henry Bruce, 1st Baronet (1788–1822), Irish priest
- Henry James Bruce (1880–1951), British diplomat and author

== See also ==
- Harry Bruce (disambiguation)
