= Stewart Bruce (rugby union) =

Rugby union player from Northern Ireland

- Full name: Stewart Armit MacDonald Bruce
- Born: 17 November 1858
- Died: 6 April 1937 (aged 78)
- School: King William's College

Rugby union career
- Position: Forward
International career
Years	Team	Apps	(Points)
1883–84	Ireland	3	(0)

Stewart Armit MacDonald Bruce (17 November 1858 — 6 April 1937) was an Irish international rugby union player.

The son of a lieutenant colonel, Bruce came from a well known County Londonderry family, who were long-time residents of Ballyscullion House, Bellaghy. He was a great grandson of Sir Henry Bruce, 1st Baronet, and a grandson of Navy admiral Sir Henry Bruce.

Bruce attended King William's College on the Isle of Man.

A rugby player in the 1880s, Bruce gained three Ireland caps playing as a forward.

Bruce served as a major with the 18th (Reserve) Battalion, Royal Irish Rifles during World War I.

== See also ==
- List of Ireland national rugby union players
