= Ballyscullion House =

Country houses in County Londonderry, Northern Ireland

Coordinates: 54.80783°N 6.49486°W

Ballyscullion House refers to two country houses built for the Hervey family near Bellaghy in County Londonderry, Northern Ireland, close to Lough Beg at north-west corner of Lough Neagh.

The first Ballyscullion House, sometimes called "Bishop's Folly", was a large house intended for Frederick Hervey, 4th Earl of Bristol and Bishop of Derry. Construction began in 1787 but it was not completed when he died in Italy in 1803. His heir decided to live at his other Irish house, Downhill House, also in County Londonderry, and the partially built Ballyscullion House was demolished by 1825.

A second and much smaller Ballyscullion House was built in 1840 for Admiral Sir Henry William Bruce, and is now owned by the Mulholland family. A military camp was built on the estate in the Second World War by the 202nd Engineering Combat Battalion, and occupied by the US 82nd Airborne Division before D-Day.

== Background ==
Hervey was the son of John Hervey, 2nd Baron Hervey, and grandson of John Hervey, 1st Earl of Bristol. He became Bishop of Cloyne in 1767 and was translated to become Bishop of Derry in 1768. He succeeded his elder brothers as the 4th Earl of Bristol in 1779.

The original Ballyscullion House was the second of three palatial country houses built by the Earl Bishop, two in Ireland and one in England. The first, Downhill, was built on the north coast of County Londonderry between about 1775 and 1785, and includes Mussenden Temple. Downhill was damaged by fire in 1851, restored, fell into disrepair while occupied by the Royal Air Force in the Second World War, and now lies in ruins.

Ballyscullion was his second house in Ireland, and may have been a prototype for a third house, Ickworth House in England, designed by Mario Asprucci, where building work began in 1795. Ickworth was completed by the 5th Earl of Bristol after the 4th Earl's death, and is even larger than Ballyscullion, with a dome some 100 feet (30 m) high and a frontage of over 600 feet (180 m).

== First Ballyscullion House ==
Building work began at Ballyscullion in 1787, shortly after Downhill was completed. Hervey probably employed the same Irish architect, Michael Shanahan. The design may have been based on John Plaw's Belle Isle, Windermere, or Palladio's Villa Capra, both themselves inspired by the Pantheon in Rome.

The northern façade resembles St Peter's Basilica in Rome, with a central domed rotunda flanked by curved wings, and a large pavilion at each end, forming a front measured 350 feet (110 m) in length. The house was faced with local stone, from the Sperrin Mountains to the west (possibly near Ballinascreen or Dungiven).

The portico to the north had four pillars with a pediment bearing Hervey's arms, carved in Italy. A Greek verse in gold letters read (in translation) "Immediately open ye doors, for much wealth is within, and, with that wealth, fresh-springing benevolence".

The central rotunda was an oval measuring 94 × 84 feet (29 × 26 m), surrounded by 20 Corinthian pilasters. On the frieze was a Latin verse circling the house, reading:

Hic viridi in campo, templum de marmore ponam,
Propter aquam, tardis ingens ubi flexibus errat
Bannius, et tenui praetexit arundine ripas

Which can be translated as: “Here is a verdant plain; I will place a temple of marble beside the waters, where the vast Bann strays in sluggish windings, and clothes his banks with tender reed.”

Above the giant first storey were two further storeys, an entablature and attic storey 12 feet (3.7 m) high, and a dome with a sky-light.

Inside was an oval lobby of 24 × 22.5 feet (7.3 × 6.9 m) with classical statues in niches. A double corkscrew staircase lit from above - possibly inspired by the famous staircase at the Château de Chambord - led up to a circular drawing room on the first floor, with views across to the Antrim hills to the east, the Mountains of Mourne to the south and the Sperrins to the west. Oval drawing and dining-rooms on the first floor each measured 36 × 24 × 18 feet (11.0 × 7.3 × 5.5 m), and with a library that measured 70 × 22.5 feet (21.3 × 6.9 m). Corridors led thorough the two wings to pavilions intended as galleries 82 × 25 feet (25.0 × 7.6 m), one for Italian paintings and one for Flemish paintings.

== Demolition ==
The Earl Bishop died in Italy in July 1803, when the rotunda was almost completed, although its windows had been removed to avoid the window tax. The unfinished house was inherited Rev Henry Hervey Aston Bruce (later 1st Baronet). Bruce was the Earl Bishop's cousin and the brother of his friend Mrs Frideswide Mussenden, after whom Mussenden Temple at Downhill was named. Bruce decided to live at Downhill, where he had been the Earl Bishop's steward. He removed many of the contents and fittings from Ballyscullion to Downhill, and Ballyscullion was demolished.

The columns from Ballyscullion’s portico were bought by Dr. Nathaniel Alexander, then the Church of Ireland Bishop of Down and Connor. Alexander donated the columns to be incorporated in the rebuilding of St George's Church, Belfast, where they form its portico. Many fireplaces, columns, windows and other features from Ballyscullion can still be found in other historic houses in Ireland: Alexander also acquired other marble columns and chimneypieces for his house at Portglenone House - now a Cistercian monastery; other chimneypieces adorn Bellarena House; an Italian chimneypiece from Downhill (probably originally from Ballyscullion) is today at Castle Upton in County Antrim; and the staircase was bought by Charles O'Neill, 1st Earl O'Neill to be included in Shane’s Castle, then being rebuilt, but was destroyed in a fire in 1816.

Charles Lever described the house in his 1899 book, The Bramleighs of Bishop's Folly.

== Second Ballyscullion House ==
A second Ballyscullion House was built near the remains of the first house in 1840 by Sir Charles Lanyon for Admiral Sir Henry William Bruce, a younger son of the Rev. Sir Henry Hervey Aston Bruce, 1st Baronet. The admiral had fought at the Battle of Trafalgar as boy aged 13, and went on to be Commander-in-Chief, Pacific Station from 1854 to 1857, and Commander-in-Chief, Portsmouth from 1860 to 1863.

The new house remained in the Bruce family until it was bought by Sir Henry and Lady Mulholland in 1938. Sir Henry Mulholland, 1st Baronet was the Speaker of the Northern Ireland House of Commons from 1929 to 1945.

In the Second World War, the estate, renamed Camp Ballyscullion, was prepared by the 202nd Engineering Combat Battalion for US soldiers of the 82nd Airborne Division before D-Day.

Ballyscullion House remains a private house owned by the Mulholland family. It may be hired as a wedding venue or film location: part of Game of Thrones was filmed in the park.
