= Stewart Bruce =

Stewart or Stuart Bruce may refer to:

- Sir Stewart Bruce, 1st Baronet (c. 1764–1841), Irish politician
- Stewart Bruce (cricketer) (born 1969), Scottish cricketer
- Stewart Bruce (rugby union), Irish international rugby union player
- Stuart Bruce (engineer) (born 1962), English recording engineer

== See also ==
- Bruce Stewart (disambiguation)
- Bruce (surname)
