= Sir Henry Bruce, 3rd Baronet =

Irish Conservative politician

Sir Henry Bruce Bt PC (Ire)
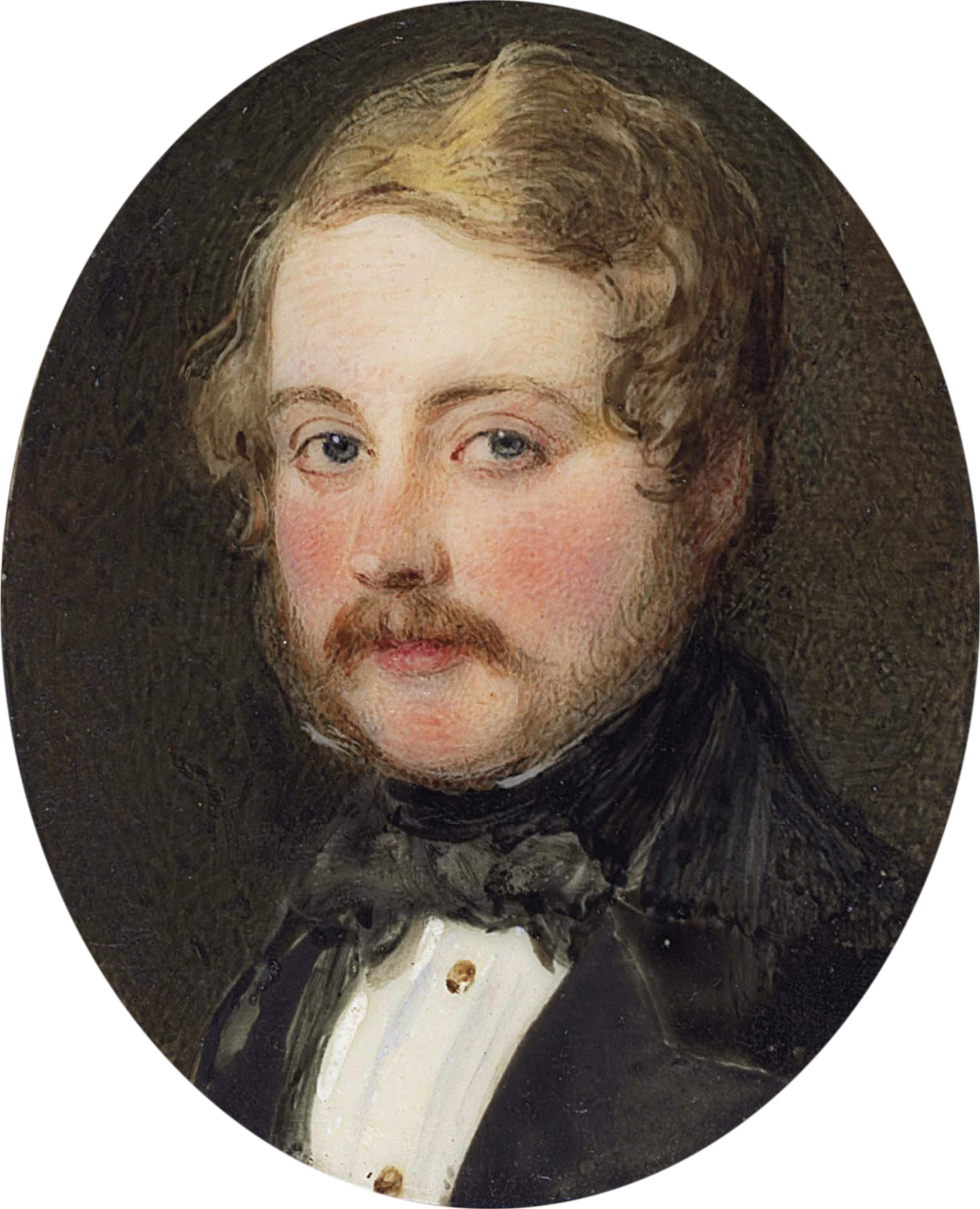
- Portrait of Sir Henry by William Charles Ross, 1841

Member of Parliament for Coleraine
- In office 1880–1885
- Preceded by: Daniel Taylor
- Succeeded by: Constituency abolished
- In office 1862–1874
- Preceded by: John Boyd
- Succeeded by: Daniel Taylor

Personal details
- Born: Henry Hervey Bruce; 22 September 1820
- Died: 8 December 1907 (aged 87)
- Spouse: Marianne Margaret Clifton (m. 1842; died 1891)
- Children: Sir Hervey Bruce, 4th Baronet; James Andrew Thomas Bruce
- Parent(s): Sir James Bruce, 2nd Baronet; Ellen Hesketh

Sir Henry Hervey Bruce, 3rd Baronet PC (Ire) (22 September 1820 – 8 December 1907) was an Irish Conservative politician. He was Member of Parliament for Coleraine from 1862 to 1874, and from 1880 to 1885.

== Early life ==
Bruce was born on 22 September 1820. He was the eldest son of Ellen Hesketh (d. 1864) and Sir James Bruce, 2nd Baronet, an officer in the Royal Horse Artillery at Waterloo who served as a Vice-Lieutenant of County Londonderry. Among his siblings were Col. Robert Bruce (who married Mary Caroline Burgoyne, a daughter of Col. Sir John Burgoyne, 9th Baronet), the Rev. Lloyd Stuart Bruce (father of Edith Agnes Kathleen Bruce, the wife of Robert Falcon Scott).

His maternal grandfather was Robert Bamford Hesketh of Gwrych Castle, Denbighshire. His paternal grandparents were Sir Henry Bruce, 1st Baronet and Letitia Barnard. His grandfather, who was the brother of Sir Stewart Bruce, 1st Baronet, inherited Downhill House from their cousin, Frederick Hervey, 4th Earl of Bristol, and was created Baronet, of Downhill in the Baronetage of the United Kingdom, in 1804.

== Career ==
He held the office of High Sheriff of County Londonderry in 1846. Bruce was elected to the House of Commons at an unopposed by-election in 1862, following the death of the Conservative MP John Boyd. He was re-elected unopposed at the general elections in 1865 and 1868, but was defeated at the 1874 general election by the Liberal candidate Daniel Taylor. He defeated Taylor (by 222 votes to 193) at the 1880 general election, and held the seat until the borough of Coleraine lost its separate parliamentary representation at the 1885 general election.

He held the office of County Grand Master of the County Grand Orange Lodge of Londonderry between 1855 and 1857.

He was Lord Lieutenant of County Londonderry from 1877 to 1907, and Honorary Colonel of the Londonderry Militia (later 9th Brigade, North Irish Division, Royal Artillery) from 1878. He was sworn of the Privy Council of Ireland in 1889.

== Personal life ==
In 1842 he married Marianne Margaret Clifton (d 1891), daughter of Sir Juckes Granville Juckes-Clifton, 8th Baronet of Clifton Hall, Nottingham. Together, they were the parents of:

- Sir Hervey Juckes Lloyd Bruce, 4th Baronet (1843–1919), who married Ellen Maud Ricardo, daughter of Percy Ricardo, in 1872.
- Admiral Sir James Andrew Thomas Bruce (1846–1921), who married Catherine Mary Philippa Wodehouse, daughter of Col. Edwin Wodehouse and sister of Sir Frederick Wodehouse, in 1877.

Lady Bruce died on 28 July 1891. Sir Henry died on 8 December 1909 and was succeeded in the baronetcy by his eldest son, Hervey.

Parliament of the United Kingdom
Preceded by John Boyd	Member of Parliament for Coleraine; 1862 – 1874	Succeeded by Daniel Taylor
Preceded by Daniel Taylor	Member of Parliament for Coleraine; 1880 – 1885	Constituency abolished
Baronetage of the United Kingdom
Preceded by James Robertson Bruce	Baronet (of Downhill); 1836–1907	Succeeded by Hervey Juckes Lloyd Bruce
