= 1862 Coleraine by-election =

UK parliamentary by-election

The 1862 Coleraine by-election of 31 January 1862 was called on the death of the previous Conservative M.P. John Boyd in January 1862. The only candidate was Conservative Sir Henry Hervey Bruce, 3rd Baronet. He retained the seat until the 1874 United Kingdom general election when he was defeated by the Liberal Daniel Taylor.
