= Coleraine (UK Parliament constituency) =

UK parliamentary constituency in Ireland, 1801–1885

- Former borough constituency for the House of Commons
- County: County Londonderry
- Borough: Coleraine

1801–1885
- Seats: 1
- Created from: Coleraine
- Replaced by: North Londonderry

Coleraine is a former United Kingdom Parliament constituency in Ireland, returning one MP from 1801 to 1885.

== History and boundaries ==
Coleraine was an original constituency represented in Parliament when the Union of Great Britain and Ireland took effect on 1 January 1801.

This constituency was the parliamentary borough of Coleraine in County Londonderry. In December 1831, boundary commissioners proposed boundaries for the borough. It was defined by the Parliamentary Boundaries (Ireland) Act 1832 as:

East of the River Bann.—The Townland called "Coleraine and Suburbs".
West of the River Bann.—From the Point at which the Northern Bank which bounds the Plantation of Jackson Hall meets the River Bann, Westward, along the said Bank to the End thereof; thence along another Bank which runs nearly in continuation of the before-mentioned Bank to the Point where the same meets the Ballycairn Road; thence in a straight Line to the Point where the Downhill Road leaves the old Road to New Town Limavady; thence to the Point where the Three Townlands of North Ballinteer, Church-land, and Lismurphy meet; thence along the Boundary between the Townlands of Church-land and Lismurphy to the River Bann.

The borough was disfranchised under the Redistribution of Seats Act 1885, which took effect at the 1885 general election.

== Members of Parliament ==
Election	Member	Party	Note
1 January 1801	Walter Jones	Tory	1801: Co-opted
13 November 1806	Sir George Hill, Bt	Tory	Also returned by and elected to sit for Londonderry City
4 February 1807	Walter Jones	Tory	Resigned
26 June 1809	John Beresford	Tory	
17 October 1812	Lord George Beresford	Tory	Resigned
10 June 1814	Sir John Beresford, Bt	Tory	Resigned
22 February 1823	Sir John Brydges	Tory	Unseated on petition 4 August 1831
4 August 1831	William Taylor Copeland	Whig	Declared duly elected on petition
13 December 1832	Sir John Beresford, Bt	Tory	Unseated on petition 27 May 1833
27 May 1833	William Taylor Copeland	Whig	Declared duly elected on petition
4 August 1837	Edward Litton	Conservative	Appointed Master of Chancery in Ireland
18 February 1843	John Boyd	Conservative	
5 August 1847	John Boyd	Peelite	Resigned
22 March 1852	Rt Hon. Richard Bourke	Conservative	
30 March 1857	John Boyd	Conservative	Died 2 January 1862
31 January 1862	Sir Henry Bruce, Bt	Conservative	
6 February 1874	Daniel Taylor	Liberal	
3 April 1880	Sir Henry Bruce, Bt	Conservative	Last MP for the constituency
1885	Constituency abolished		

== Election results ==
=== Elections in the 1830s ===
General election 1830: Coleraine
Party	Candidate	Votes	%
Tory	John Brydges (MP)	24	61.5
Whig	John Thomas Thorp	15	38.5
Majority		9	23.0
Turnout		39	c. 18.3
Registered electors		c. 36	
Tory hold			

- Inhabitants were allowed to "tender" votes, with 2 being granted to Brydges and 15 for Thorp. However, just 22 votes of the corporation were accepted. Petitions and counter-petitions over whether the franchise extended to freemen were lodged, but both lapsed ahead of the 1831 election.

General election 1831: Coleraine
Party	Candidate	Votes	%	±%
Tory	John Brydges (MP)	17	80.5	+19.0
Whig	William Taylor Copeland	70	19.5	−19.0
Majority		53	61.0	+38.0
Turnout		87	24.7	c. +6.4
Registered electors		36		
Tory hold		Swing		

- Again, inhabitants were allowed to tender votes, with 1 being cast for Brydges and 70 for Copeland, but these were rejected, and just 16 from the corporation in favour of Brydges were accepted. A petition was again lodged and, after lengthy committee proceedings in the House of Commons, it was agreed that 23 of the 70 tendered votes from those who had been admitted as freeman in 1797 were accepted. Copeland was then declared elected.

General election 1832: Coleraine
Party	Candidate	Votes	%	±%
Tory	John Beresford	98	50.3	+30.8
Whig	William Taylor Copeland	97	49.7	−30.8
Majority		1	0.6	−60.4
Turnout		195	94.2	+69.5
Registered electors		207		
Tory hold		Swing	+30.8	

- The candidates initially had 97 votes apiece, but the mayor cast a deciding vote in favour of Beresford. A petition was again lodged and a Commons committee again ruled in favour of the freemen and seated Copeland on 27 May 1833.

General election 1835: Coleraine
Party	Candidate	Votes	%	±%
Whig	William Taylor Copeland	95	51.4	+1.7
Conservative	Henry Richardson	90	48.6	−1.7
Majority		5	2.8	N/A
Turnout		185	57.8	−36.4
Registered electors		320		
Whig gain from Conservative		Swing	+1.7	

General election 1837: Coleraine
Party	Candidate	Votes	%	±%
Conservative	Edward Litton	129	62.6	+14.0
Whig	Leslie Alexander	77	37.4	−14.0
Majority		52	25.2	N/A
Turnout		206	49.0	−8.8
Registered electors		420		
Conservative gain from Whig		Swing	+14.0	

=== Elections in the 1840s ===
General election 1841: Coleraine
Party	Candidate	Votes	%	±%
Conservative	Edward Litton	Unopposed		
Registered electors		368		
Conservative hold				

Litton resigned after being appointed Master of Chancery in Ireland, causing a by-election.

By-election, 18 February 1843: Coleraine
Party	Candidate	Votes	%	±%
Conservative	John Boyd	106	55.8	N/A
Conservative	Henry Bruce	84	44.2	N/A
Majority		22	11.6	N/A
Turnout		190	51.6	N/A
Registered electors		368		
Conservative hold		Swing	N/A	

General Election 1847: Coleraine
Party	Candidate	Votes	%	±%
Peelite	John Boyd	116	65.9	N/A
Conservative	Henry Bruce	60	34.1	N/A
Majority		56	31.8	N/A
Turnout		176	19.8	N/A
Registered electors		891		
Peelite gain from Conservative		Swing	N/A	

=== Elections in the 1850s ===
Boyd resigned by accepting the office of Steward of the Chiltern Hundreds, causing a by-election.

By-election, 22 March 1852: Coleraine
Party	Candidate	Votes	%	±%
Conservative	Richard Bourke	Unopposed		
Conservative gain from Peelite				

General election 1852: Coleraine
Party	Candidate	Votes	%	±%
Conservative	Richard Bourke	Unopposed		
Registered electors		222		
Conservative gain from Peelite				

General election 1857: Coleraine
Party	Candidate	Votes	%	±%
Conservative	John Boyd	Unopposed		
Registered electors		261		
Conservative hold				

General election 1859: Coleraine
Party	Candidate	Votes	%	±%
Conservative	John Boyd	Unopposed		
Registered electors		274		
Conservative hold				

=== Elections in the 1860s ===
Boyd's death caused a by-election.

By-election, 31 Jan 1862: Coleraine
Party	Candidate	Votes	%	±%
Conservative	Henry Bruce	Unopposed		
Registered electors		271		
Conservative hold				

General election 1865: Coleraine
Party	Candidate	Votes	%	±%
Conservative	Henry Bruce	Unopposed		
Registered electors		259		
Conservative hold				

General election 1868: Coleraine
Party	Candidate	Votes	%	±%
Conservative	Henry Bruce	Unopposed		
Registered electors		346		
Conservative hold				

=== Elections in the 1870s ===
General election 1874: Coleraine
Party	Candidate	Votes	%	±%
Liberal	Daniel Taylor	227	58.7	New
Conservative	Henry Bruce	160	41.3	N/A
Majority		67	17.4	N/A
Turnout		387	88.0	N/A
Registered electors		440		
Liberal gain from Conservative		Swing	N/A	

=== Elections in the 1880s ===
General election 1880: Coleraine
Party	Candidate	Votes	%	±%
Conservative	Henry Bruce	222	53.5	+12.2
Liberal	Daniel Taylor	193	46.5	−12.2
Majority		29	7.0	N/A
Turnout		415	87.9	−0.1
Registered electors		472		
Conservative gain from Liberal		Swing	+12.2	
