= Sir William Bruce, 9th Baronet =

Scottish cricketer

Personal information
- Full name: William Cunningham Bruce
- Born: 20 September 1825; Bombay, Bombay Presidency, British India
- Died: 29 May 1906 (aged 80); Windsor, Berkshire, England
- Batting: Unknown
- Bowling: Unknown

Career statistics
Competition	First-class
Matches	2
Runs scored	23
Batting average	5.75
100s/50s	–/–
Top score	12
Balls bowled	4
Wickets	0
Bowling average	–
5 wickets in innings	–
10 wickets in match	–
Best bowling	–
Catches/stumpings	–/–
- Source: Cricinfo, 20 July 2020

Sir William Cunningham Bruce, 9th Baronet DL (20 September 1825 – 29 May 1906) was a Scottish first-class cricketer.

The son of William Cunningham Bruce and Jane Catherine Clark, he was born in British India at Bombay in September 1825. Bruce served in the British Army with the 74th Highlanders, reaching the rank of captain. A keen cricketer, he made two appearances in first-class cricket for the Gentlemen of Kent against the Gentlemen of England at Canterbury in 1844 and 1846. He scored 23 runs in his two first-class matches, with a high score of 12. Bruce succeeded his uncle, Sir Michael Bruce, as the 9th Baronet of the Bruce baronets of Stenhouse upon his death in December 1862. He was a magistrate for Stirlingshire and served as a deputy lieutenant for the county. Bruce died in England at Windsor in May 1906. Upon his death, he was succeeded as the 10th Baronet by his son, Sir William Waller Bruce, one of three children he had with Charlotte Isabella O'Grady, who he married in 1850.

Baronetage of the United Kingdom
Preceded by Sir Michael Bruce	Baronet (of Stenhouse); 1862–1906	Succeeded by Sir William Waller Bruce
