= St George's Church, Belfast =

St George's Church
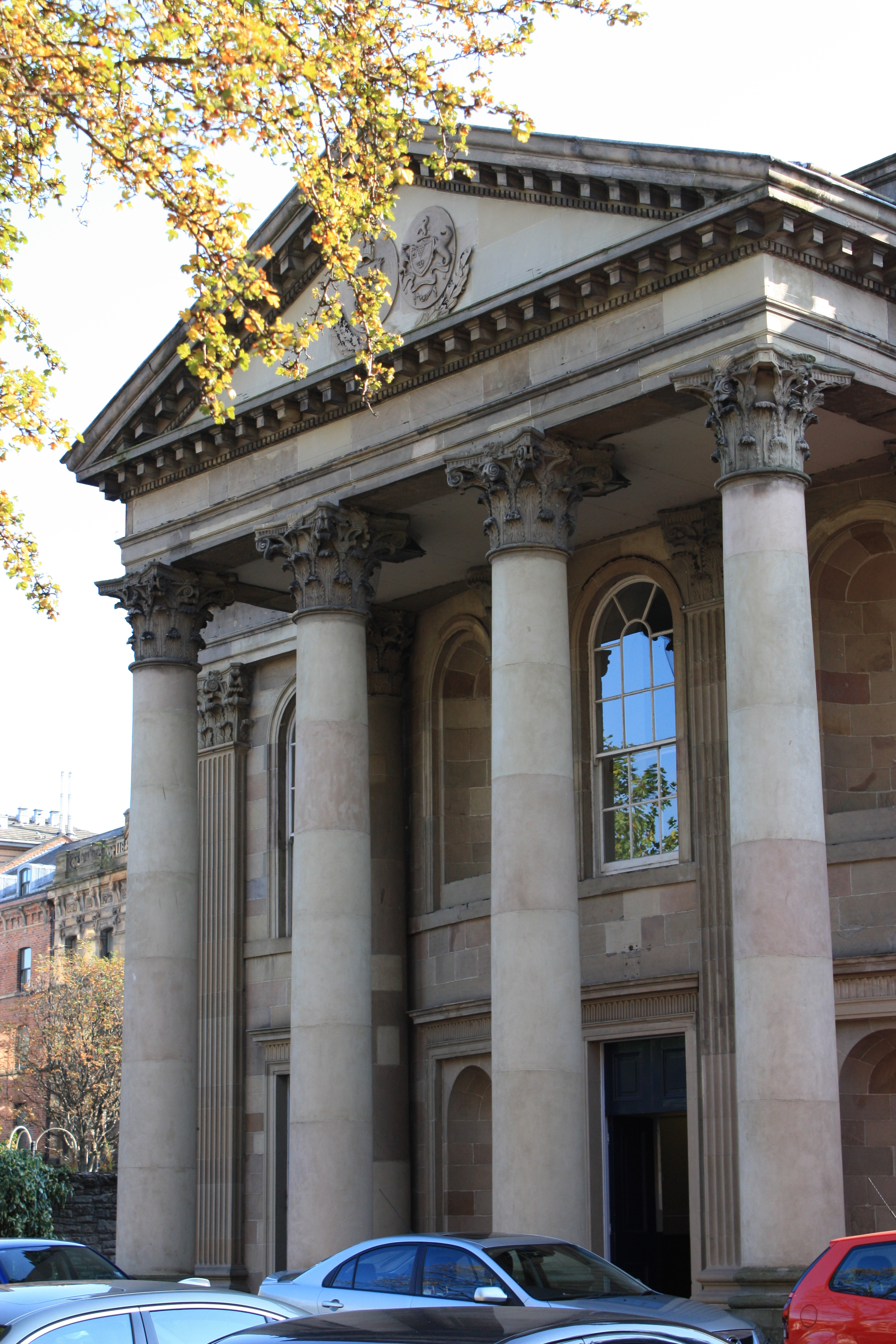
- St George's Church
- 54°36′00″N 5°55′30″W
- Location: High Street, Belfast
- Country: Northern Ireland
- Denomination: Church of Ireland
- Churchmanship: High Church
- Website: St George's Church

History
- Status: Parish church

Architecture
- Functional status: Active
- Completed: 1816

Administration
- Archdiocese: Diocese of Armagh
- Diocese: Diocese of Connor
- Parish: St George's

Clergy
- Rector: Rev. Brian Stewart

St. George's Church, Belfast is a Church of Ireland church located on High Street in Belfast, Northern Ireland. It is the oldest Church of Ireland church in Belfast. It was designed by Irish architect, John Bowden, and opened in 1816. Major refurbishment work was completed in June 2000.

== History ==
The church stands on what had been a fording place where the River Lagan and River Farset met. The earliest mention of a place of worship existing on this site is in the papal taxation rolls of 1306. The Chapel of the Ford was a chapel of ease of the main parish church at Shankill, and was constructed here for those waiting to cross the mud flats which covered most of the area that has since become central Belfast. The chapel later became known as Corporation Chapel after the newly founded Belfast Corporation.

Painting of multiple miracles by Jesus on the north wall of the chancel by Alexander Gibbs, created in 1883/4.

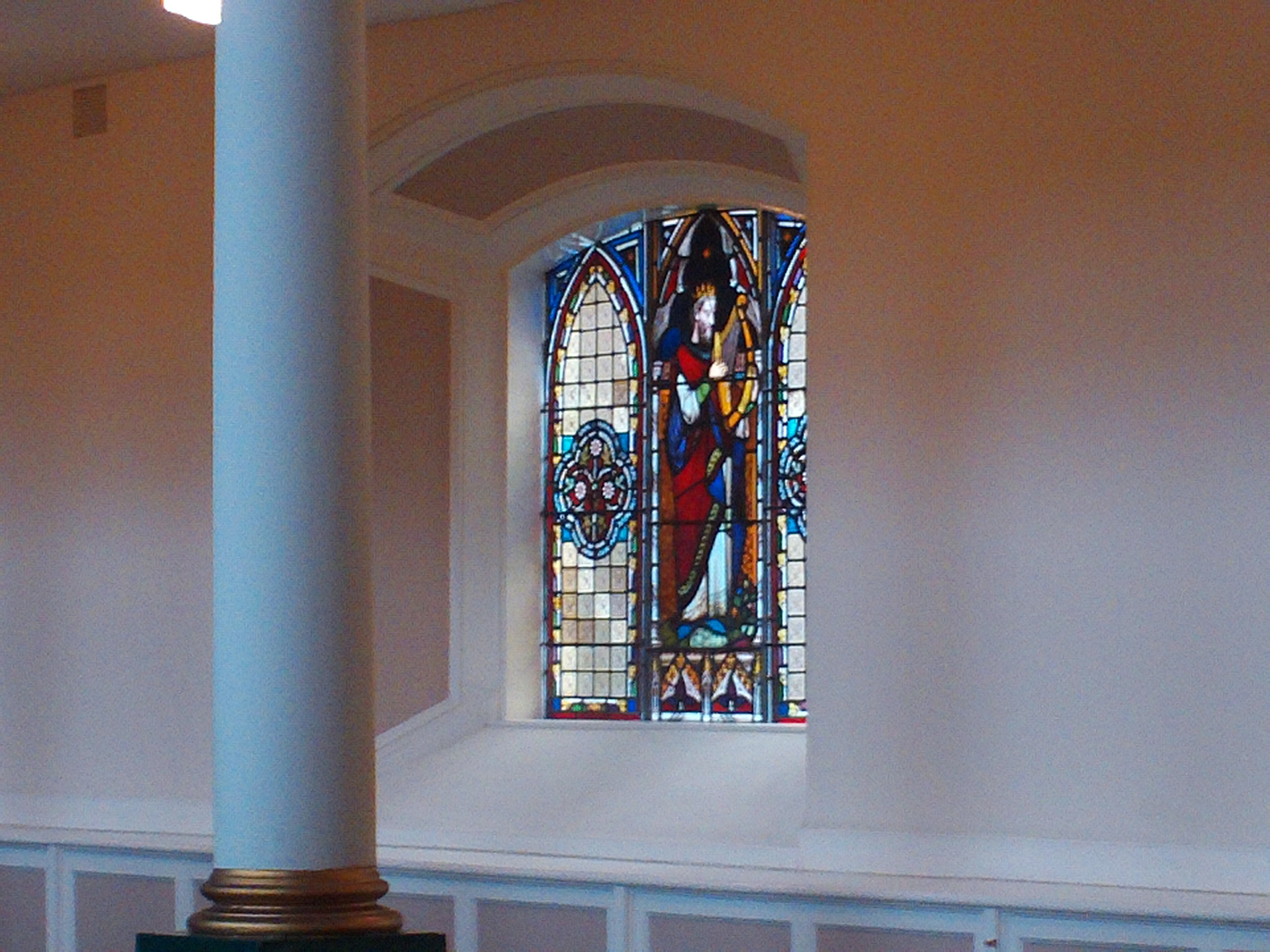
Stained glass window in the south aisle of King David, created by Sillery, Dublin, c. 1870

By the time of the Plantation of Ulster, the church had become the main parish church for the area. In 1613 James I of England granted a charter to Belfast as a key garrison town in the plantation, and St. George's became the 'corporation' church. William of Orange passed through Belfast on his way from Carrickfergus to the Battle of the Boyne, and had a famous sermon, Arise Great King, preached to him here.

By the late 18th century, however, the church had fallen into disrepair and the Earl of Chichester, the dominant local landowner, gave land for a new parish church for Belfast to be built on a more expansive site a few hundred metres away on Donegall Street. This church would later become St Anne's Cathedral. Henry Joy McCracken, a leading member of the Society of the United Irishmen and 1798 rebellion was buried in the churchyard after being hanged, before later being moved to Clifton Street Cemetery.

However, by the 1800s, the growth of industrial Belfast necessitated a second Anglican church being built, and a new St. George's was built on the old site, opening in 1816. Throughout the 19th century, the church had a series of rectors known for their flamboyant style, and in the early 20th century, St. George's developed its distinct High Church ethos. The movement of people out of the City Centre in the 20th century saw the congregation drop, and during The Troubles, the church was seriously damaged on a number of occasions by Provisional Irish Republican Army bombs.

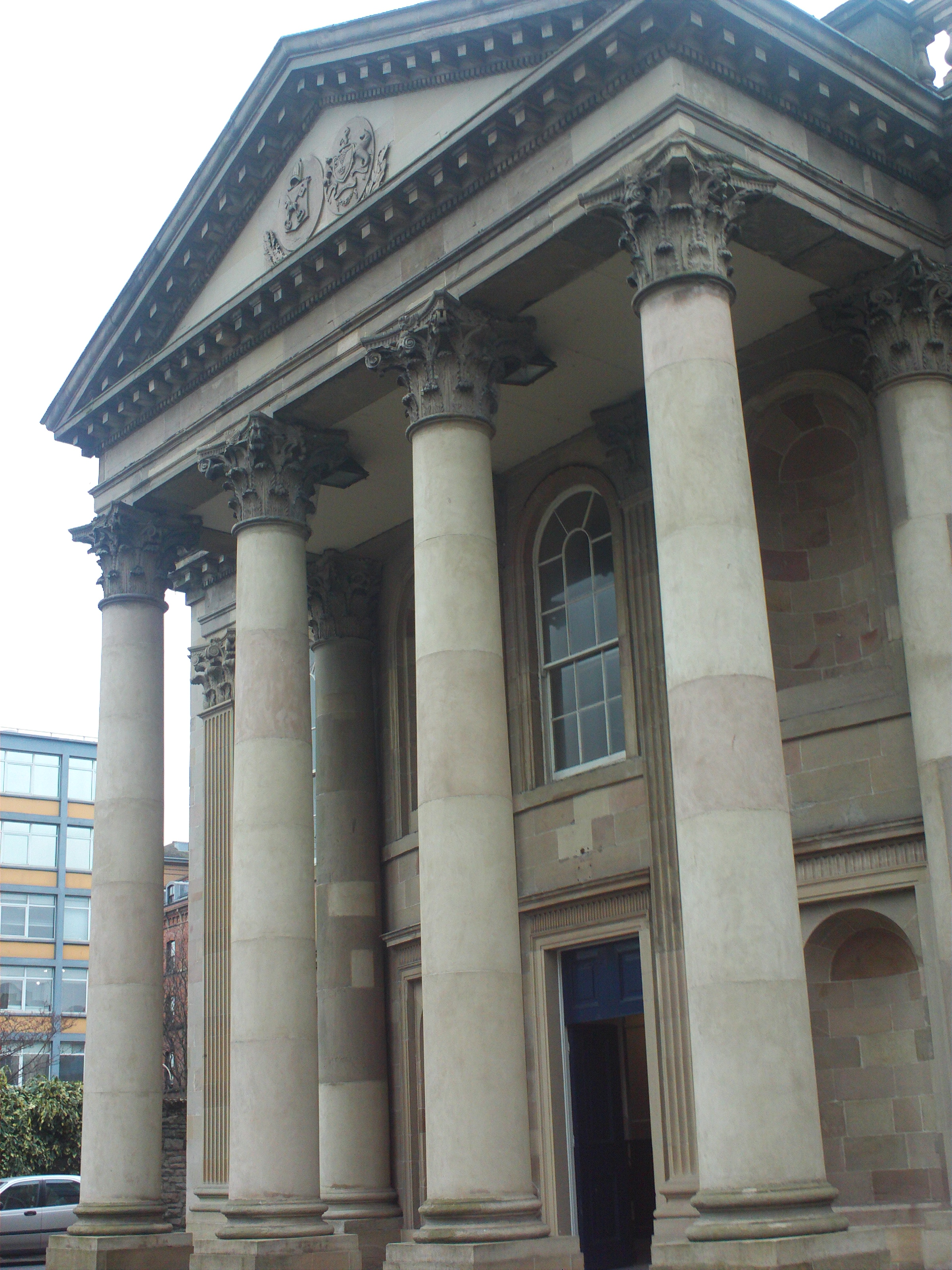
The portico was originally made to order in Egypt for the 4th Earl of Bristol's palace at Ballyscullion, near Derry (1788).

St. George's continues to be noted for its liturgical and musical tradition – it has one of the few men's and boys' church choirs in Ireland. Its ministry, both to the business community and to Belfast's homeless population, are an important part of parish life. St. George's has a diverse congregation, drawing members from different religious, cultural and social backgrounds. As of 2016, the rector of St George's (since 1994) is the Reverend Brian Stewart and Director of Music is David Falconer.

== Architecture ==
The church was designed by John Bowden of Dublin in 1811. The foundation stone was laid in June 1813 by the Earl of Massereene and the church opened in June 1816. It has a simple nave and chancel plan and is built of sandstone. Inside there is a gallery on three sides. The church originally had a plain ceiling, but in 1865 the ceiling was removed and the trusses exposed and decorated by architect W. J. Barre, who also added a new pulpit in 1867. A chancel, designed by Edward Bradell, was added in 1882.

The west end, facing High Street, has a large Corinthian pillared portico, giving the impression that it is a two storied building. The portico was originally made to order in Egypt for Frederick Hervey, 4th Earl of Bristol and Bishop of Derry, to adorn the main entrance of Ballyscullion House in County Londonderry, built in 1788. After the Earl died in 1803, the house was gradually dismantled and the portico was bought and transported to Belfast. To reach its new home, the portico was initially hauled by horse and cart to Lough Neagh. From there it went by barge, reputedly the first barge cargo brought to Belfast from Lough Neagh by the new Lagan Canal Navigation (now disused). The coats of arms on the pediment are of the Diocese of Down and the city of Belfast.

== Traditions ==
St. George's was the first Anglican church in Ireland to introduce Harvest Thanksgiving, musical recitals in church, early morning celebrations of the Holy Communion, a robed choir, drama in church, the Christmas Midnight Eucharist, the Three Hours Devotions on Good Friday, and to adopt the 1984 Alternative Prayer Book of the Church of Ireland.

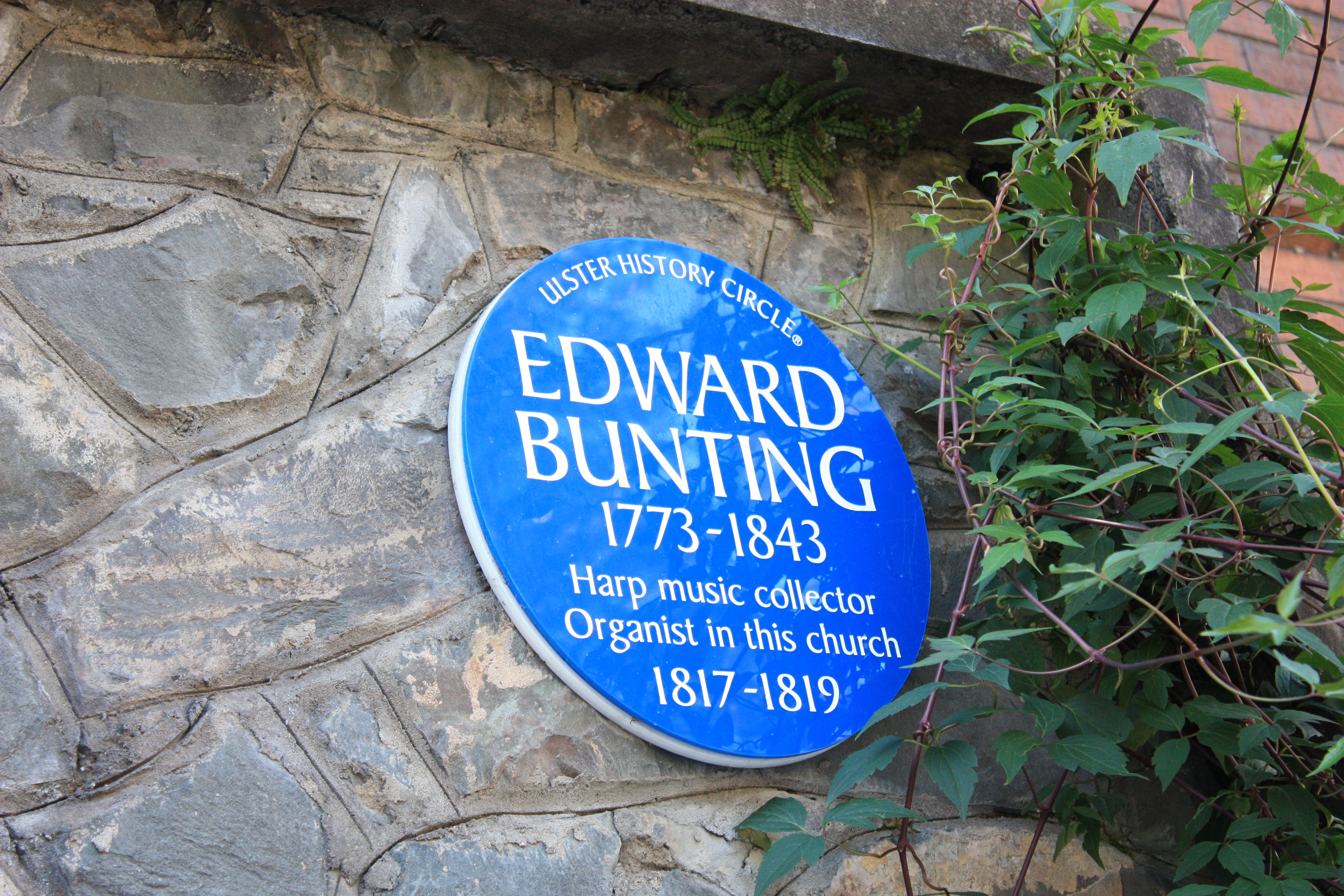
Edward Bunting blue plaque

== Notable people ==
The first church organist was Edward Bunting, between 1817 and 1821, best known for his work in collecting Irish music at the Belfast Harp Festival.
