= Bruce baronets of Stenhouse (1628) =

Coats of Arms of the Bruce baronets, of Stenhouse

The Bruce Baronetcy, of Stenhouse in the County of Clackmannan, was created in the Baronetage of Nova Scotia on 29 September 1628 for William Bruce, with remainder to his heirs male whatsoever. He was a descendant of Sir Robert Bruce of Clackmannan (14th century), who was also the ancestor of the ancestor of the Earls of Elgin. The eleventh Baronet was an author and adventurer.

== Bruce baronets, of Stenhouse (1628) ==
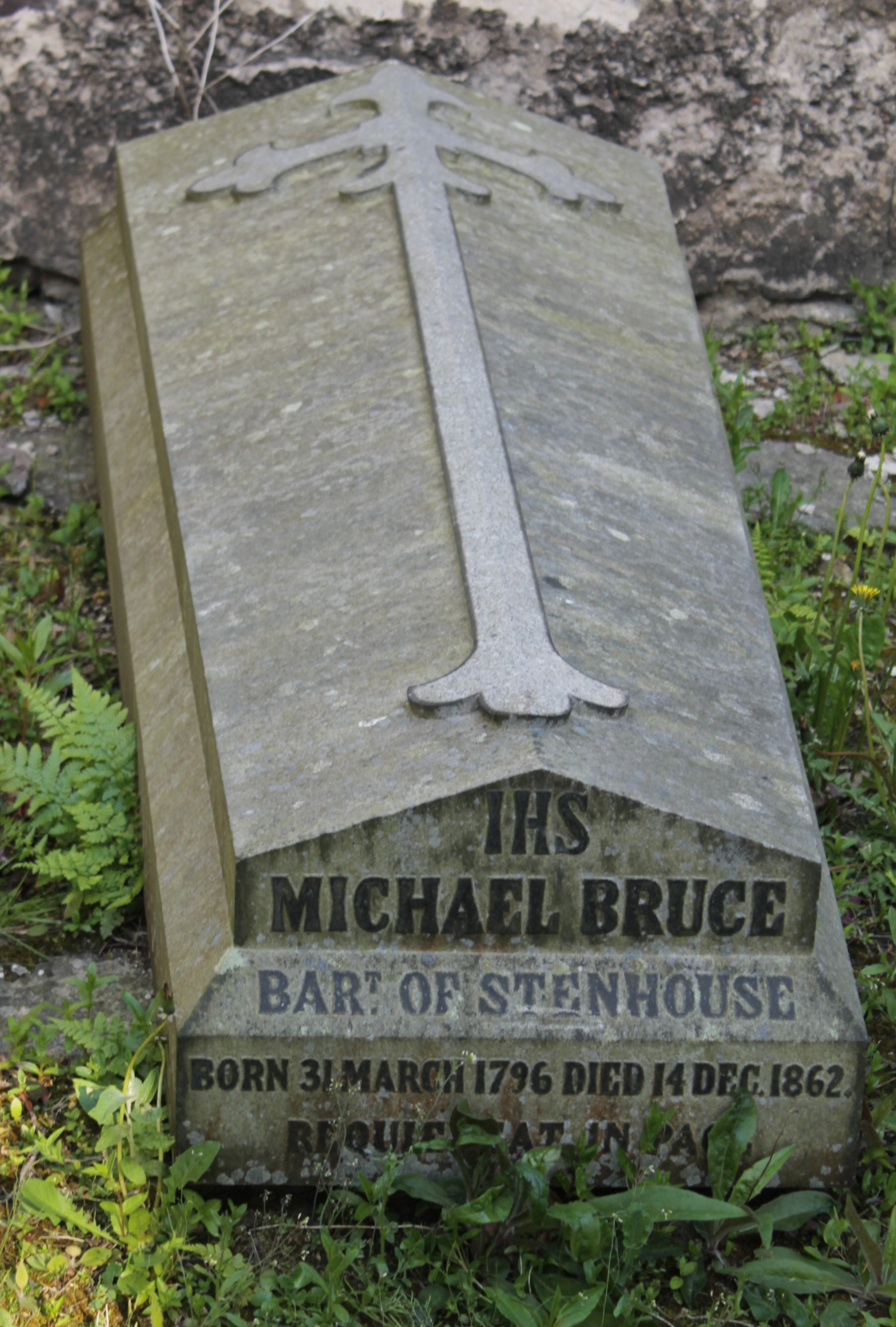
The grave of Sir Michael Bruce, 8th Baronet of Stenhouse, St Peter's Cemetery, Aberdeen

- Sir William Bruce, 1st Baronet (died 1630)
- Sir William Bruce, 2nd Baronet (1621–c. 1660)
- Sir William Bruce, 3rd Baronet (died 1682)
- Sir William Bruce, 4th Baronet (died 1721)
- Sir Robert Bruce, 5th Baronet (died c. 1760)
- Sir Michael Bruce, 6th Baronet (died 1795)
- Sir William Bruce, 7th Baronet (1739–1827)
- Sir Michael Bruce, 8th Baronet (1796–1862)
- Sir William Cunningham Bruce, 9th Baronet (1825–1906)
- Sir William Waller Bruce, 10th Baronet (1856–1912)
- Sir Michael William Selby Bruce, 11th Baronet (1874–1957)
- Sir (Francis) Michael Ian Bruce, 12th Baronet (1926–2021)
- Sir Michael Ian Richard Bruce, 13th Baronet (b. 1950)

The heir presumptive is the present holder's brother Robert Dudley Bruce (b. 1952)

== Extended family ==
Michael Bruce (1823–1883), grandson of Patrick Craufurd Bruce, fifth son of the sixth Baronet, was a general in the British Army. His grandson Ian Robert Craufurd George Mary Bruce (1890–1956) was a brigadier in the Queen's Own Cameron Highlanders. Michael Robert Bruce (1832–1893), second son of William Cunningham Bruce, second son of the seventh Baronet, was a major-general in the British Army. Alexander James Bruce (1828–1906), eldest son of Alexander Fairlie Bruce, third son of the seventh Baronet, was a major-general in the Madras Army. Nigel Bruce, second son of the tenth Baronet and younger brother of the eleventh Baronet, was an actor. See also the Bruce-Clifton Baronetcy of Downhill and the Bruce Baronetcy of Dublin.
