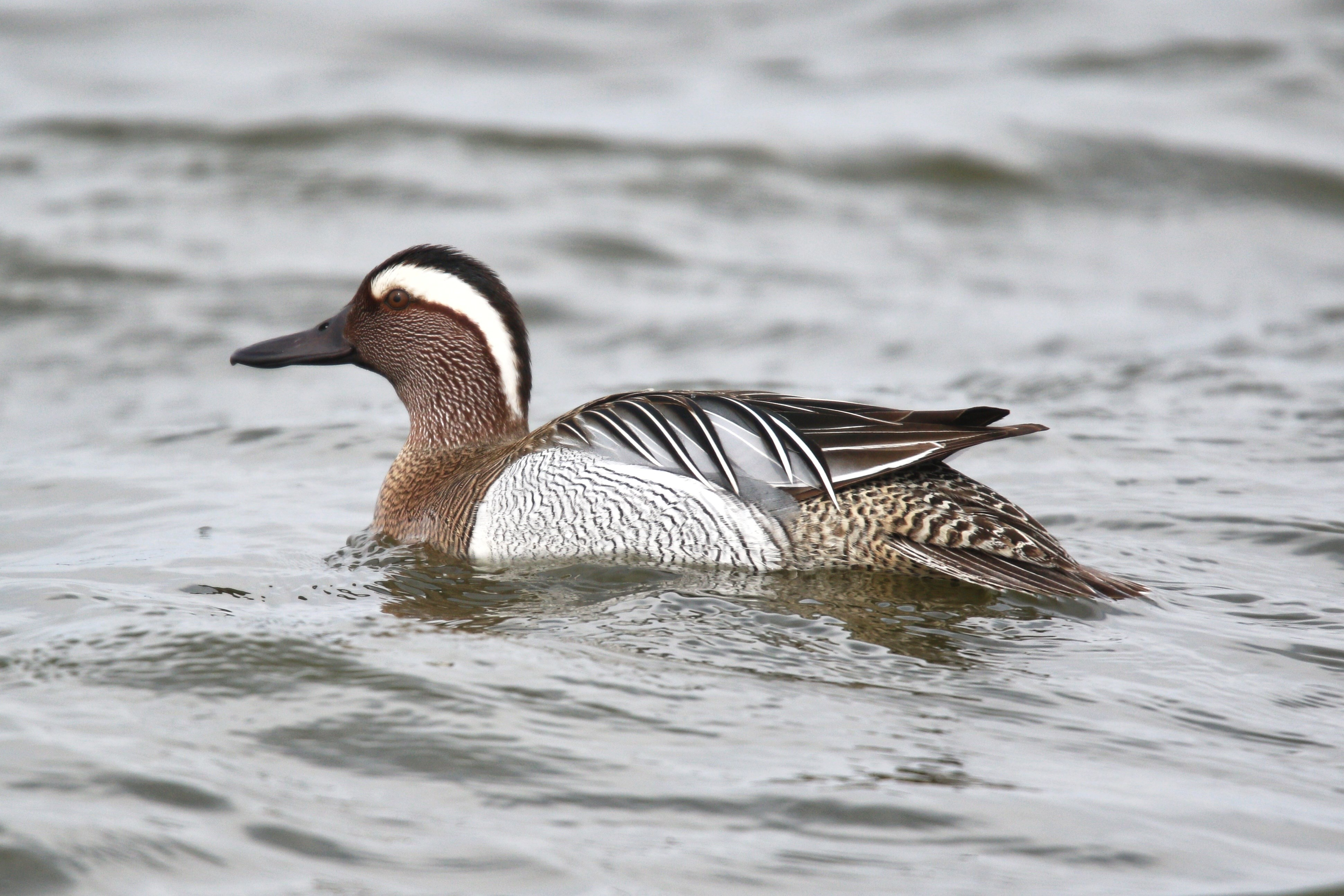
- Male
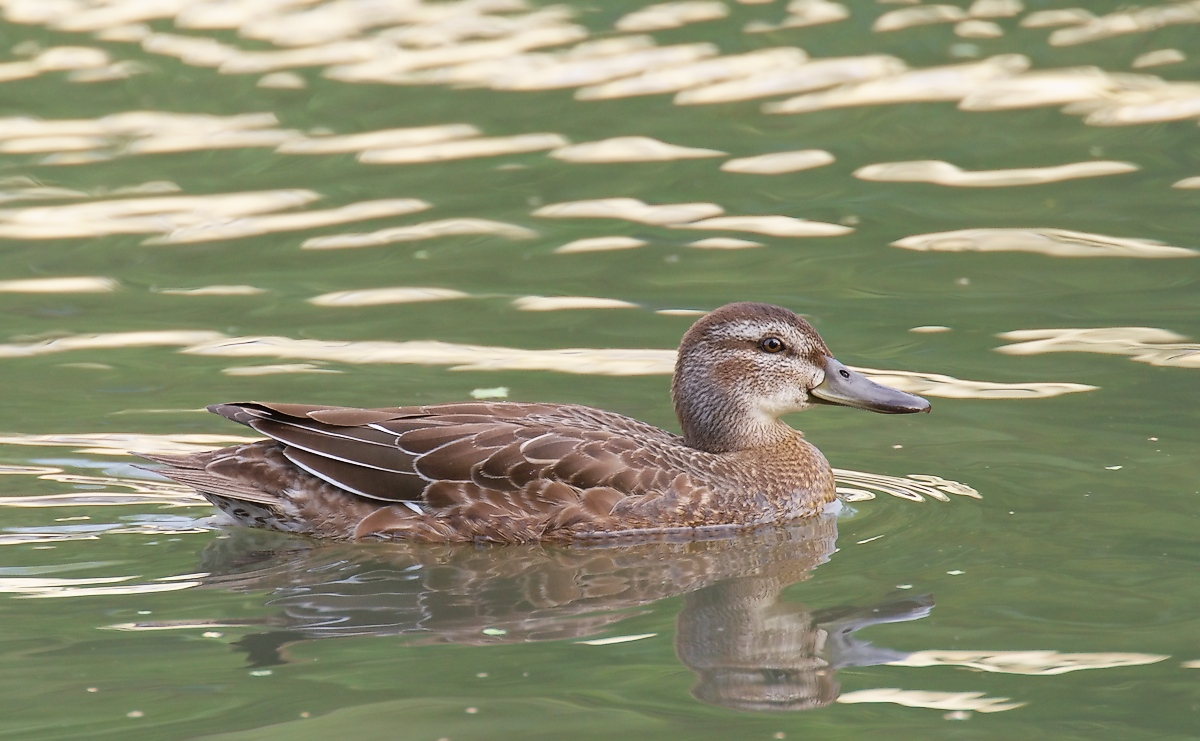
- Female

Conservation status
- Least Concern (IUCN 3.1)

Scientific classification
- Kingdom: Animalia
- Phylum: Chordata
- Class: Aves
- Order: Anseriformes
- Family: Anatidae
- Genus: Spatula
- Species: S. querquedula

Binomial name
- Spatula querquedula (Linnaeus, 1758)

Synonyms
- Anas querquedula Linnaeus, 1758; Anas circia Linnaeus, 1758

= Garganey =

Species of bird

The garganey (Spatula querquedula) is a small dabbling duck. It breeds in much of Europe and across the Palearctic, but is strictly migratory, with the entire population moving to Africa, India (in particular Santragachi), Bangladesh (in the natural reservoirs of Sylhet district) and Australasia during the winter of the Northern hemisphere, where large flocks can occur. This species was first described by Carl Linnaeus in his landmark 1758 10th edition of Systema Naturae. Like other small ducks such as the Eurasian teal, this species rises easily from the water with a fast twisting wader-like flight.

Their breeding habitat is grassland adjacent to shallow marshes and steppe lakes.

== Taxonomy ==
The first formal description of the garganey was by the Swedish naturalist Carl Linnaeus in 1758 in the tenth edition of his Systema Naturae. He introduced the binomial name Anas querquedula. A molecular phylogentic study comparing mitochondrial DNA sequences published in 2009 found that the genus Anas, as then defined, was non-monophyletic. The genus was subsequently split into four monophyletic genera with ten species including the garganey moved into the resurrected genus Spatula. This genus had been originally proposed by the German zoologist Friedrich Boie in 1822. The name Spatula is the Latin for a "spoon" or "spatula". The specific epithet is derived from Latin querquedula, a word believed to represent to its call.

The common English name dates from the 17th century and comes from Lombard language gargenei, the plural of garganell, which ultimately comes from the Late Latin gargala "tracheal artery". The English usage owes its origins to Conrad Gesner who used the Italian name in the third volume of his Historiae Animalium (History of Animals) of 1555.

== Description ==
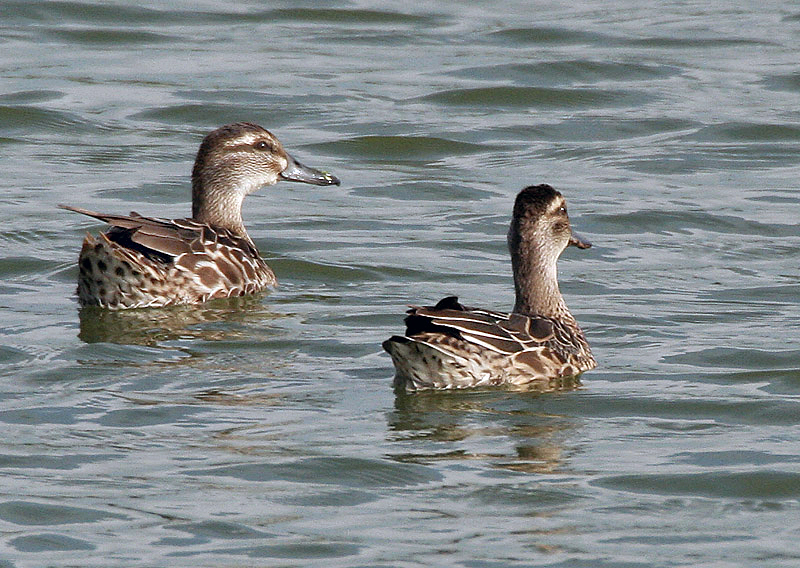
Females

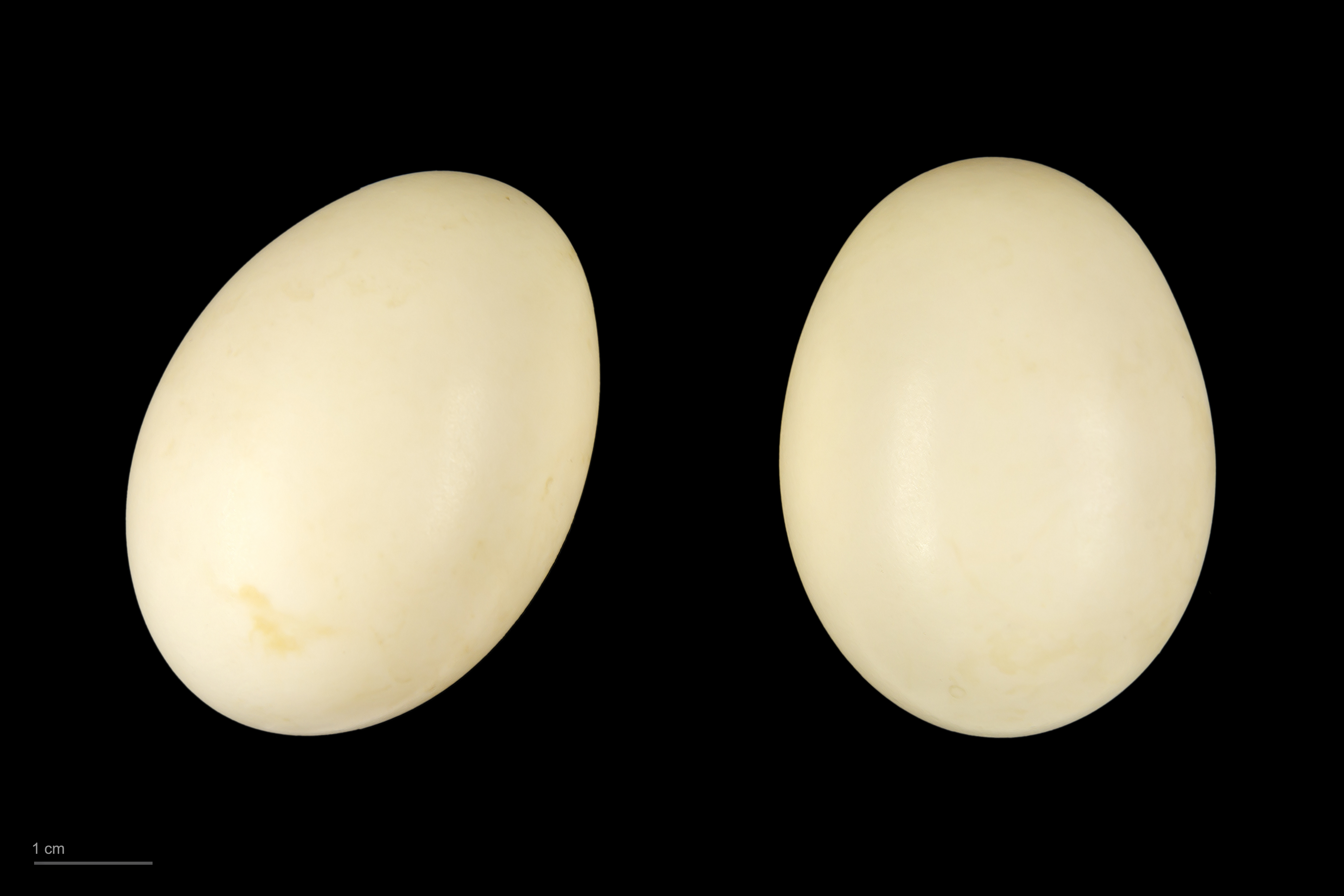
Spatula querquedula - MHNT

The adult male is unmistakable, with its brown head and breast with a broad white crescent over the eye. The rest of the plumage is grey, with loose grey scapular feathers. It has a grey bill and legs. In flight, it shows a pale blue speculum with a white border. When swimming it will show prominent white edges on its tertials. His crown (anatomy) is dark and his face is reddish brown.

Some care is needed in separating the brown female from the similar common teal, but the stronger face markings and more frequent head-shaking when dabbling are good indicators. Confusion with the female of the blue-winged teal is also possible, but the head and bill shape is different, and the latter species has yellow legs. Pale eyebrow, dark eye line, pale lore spot bordered by a second dark line.

Measurements:

- Size: 41 cm
- Wingspan: 58 – 69 cm.
- Weight: 300–440 g

These birds feed mainly by skimming rather than upending.

The male has a distinctive crackling mating call; the female is rather silent for a female duck, but can manage a feeble quack.

Garganey are rare breeding birds in the British Isles, with most breeding in quiet marshes in Norfolk and Suffolk. In Ireland a few pairs breed in County Wexford, and at Lough Beg in County Londonderry, with occasional breeding elsewhere.

The garganey is one of the species to which the Agreement on the Conservation of African-Eurasian Migratory Waterbirds (AEWA) applies. The status of the garganey on the IUCN Red List is least concern.
