= Seamus Heaney HomePlace =

Arts & literary centre in Bellaghy, Northern Ireland

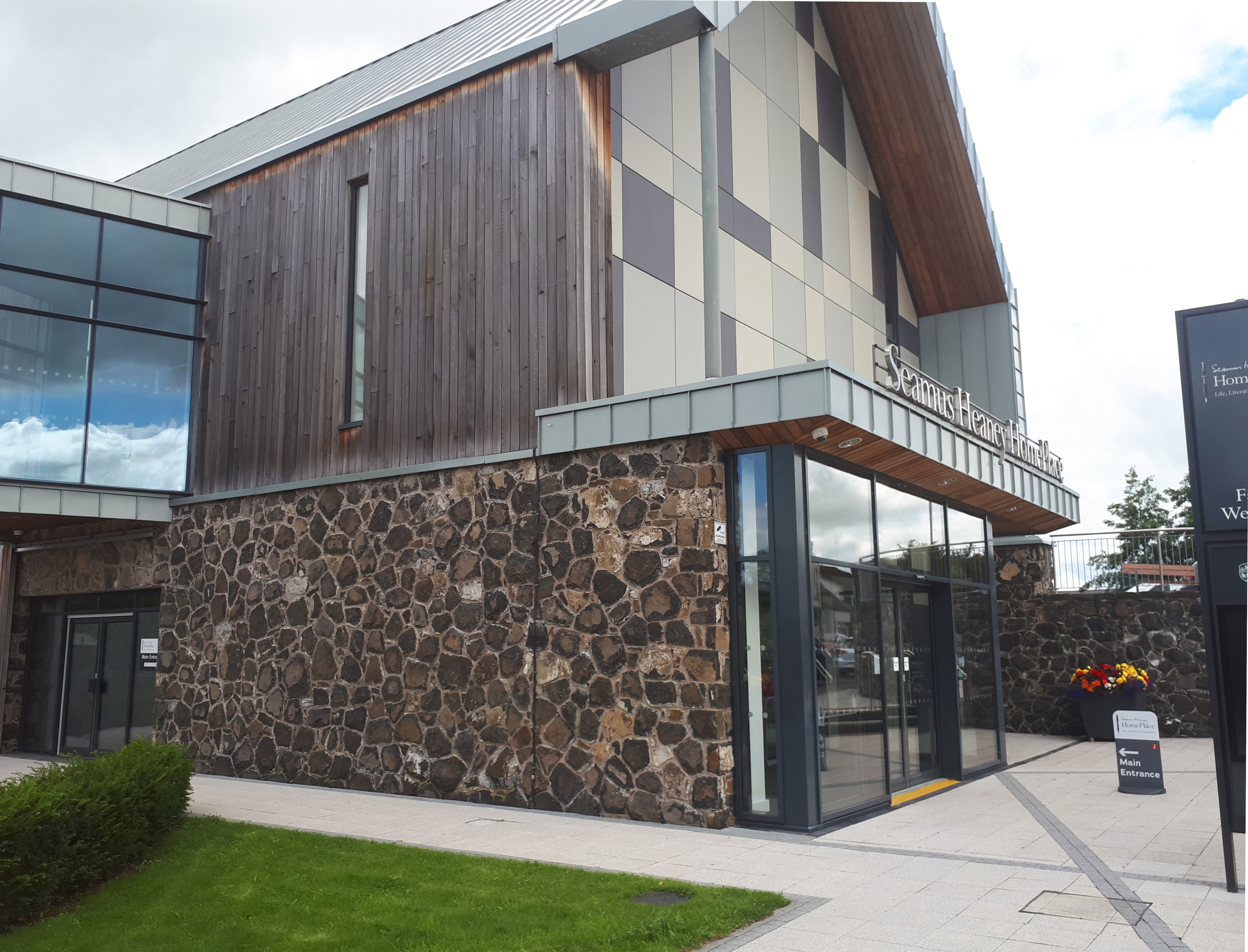
- Entrance of Seamus Heaney HomePlace entrance, August 2023
- Interactive map of the Seamus Heaney HomePlace area
- Alternative names: Seamus Heaney centre

General information
- Type: Arts & literary centre
- Location: 45 Main St, Bellaghy, Magherafelt BT45 8HT
- Coordinates: 54°48′28″N 6°31′16″W
- Year built: 2015–2016
- Construction started: January 2015
- Completed: September 2016
- Opened: September 30, 2016
- Cost: £4.25 million
- Owner: Mid Ulster District Council
- Management: Brian McCormick (Manager)

Technical details
- Floor count: 2
- Floor area: 21,000 sq ft (1,950 m^{2})

Design and construction
- Architecture firm: W&M Given Architects
- Main contractor: Brendan Loughran & Sons Ltd.

Other information
- Parking: See HomePlace website
- Public transit access: Bus: 127 Ulsterbus

Website
- seamusheaneyhome.com

The Seamus Heaney HomePlace is an arts and literary centre in Bellaghy, County Londonderry, Northern Ireland. It displays the life and work of Seamus Heaney.

Designed by W&M Given Architects, construction began in 2015 by contractors Brendan Loughran & Sons Ltd. It opened in late September 2016. On the site originally stood a RUC barracks.

It has won multiple awards throughout its operation, and its visitors include Charles III, Liam Neeson, and various award-winning poets. It holds a permanent exhibition titled Seamus Heaney: Man and Boy, and frequently hosts different events throughout the year. It attracted 40,000 people in its first year.

== Site ==
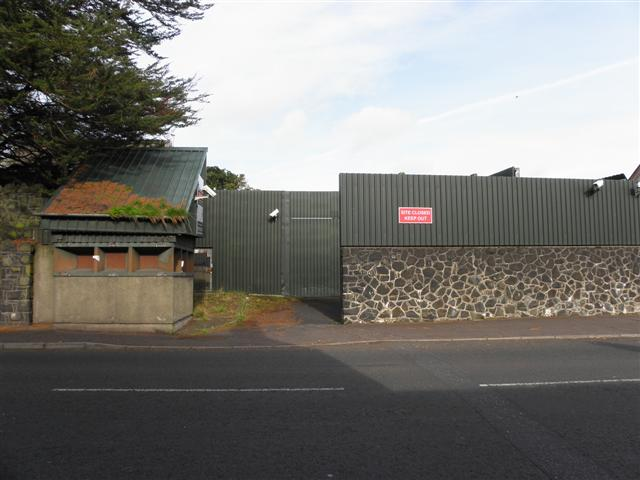
Closed Bellaghy police station in 2011, prior to demolition

It stands on the former site of the abandoned Bellaghy Royal Ulster Constabulary barracks, which the Mid Ulster District Council bought in the late 1990s during the demilitarization of Northern Ireland. The site measures 21,000 square feet (1,950 m^{2}) in area.

== Architecture ==
The centre was designed by W&M Given Architects. The company, quoted in a report by the Department for Communities, says the building was intended to reflect vernacular architecture within Bellaghy:

The design draws on the built heritage of the area, giving the site a direct relationship with the village street front and public open space. The composition of the building forms are a contemporary response to farm settlement clusters common throughout the South Derry area.

— Philip Hutchinson (Project Architect), Heritage Asset Audit: Bellaghy Area, pg. 20

=== Exterior ===
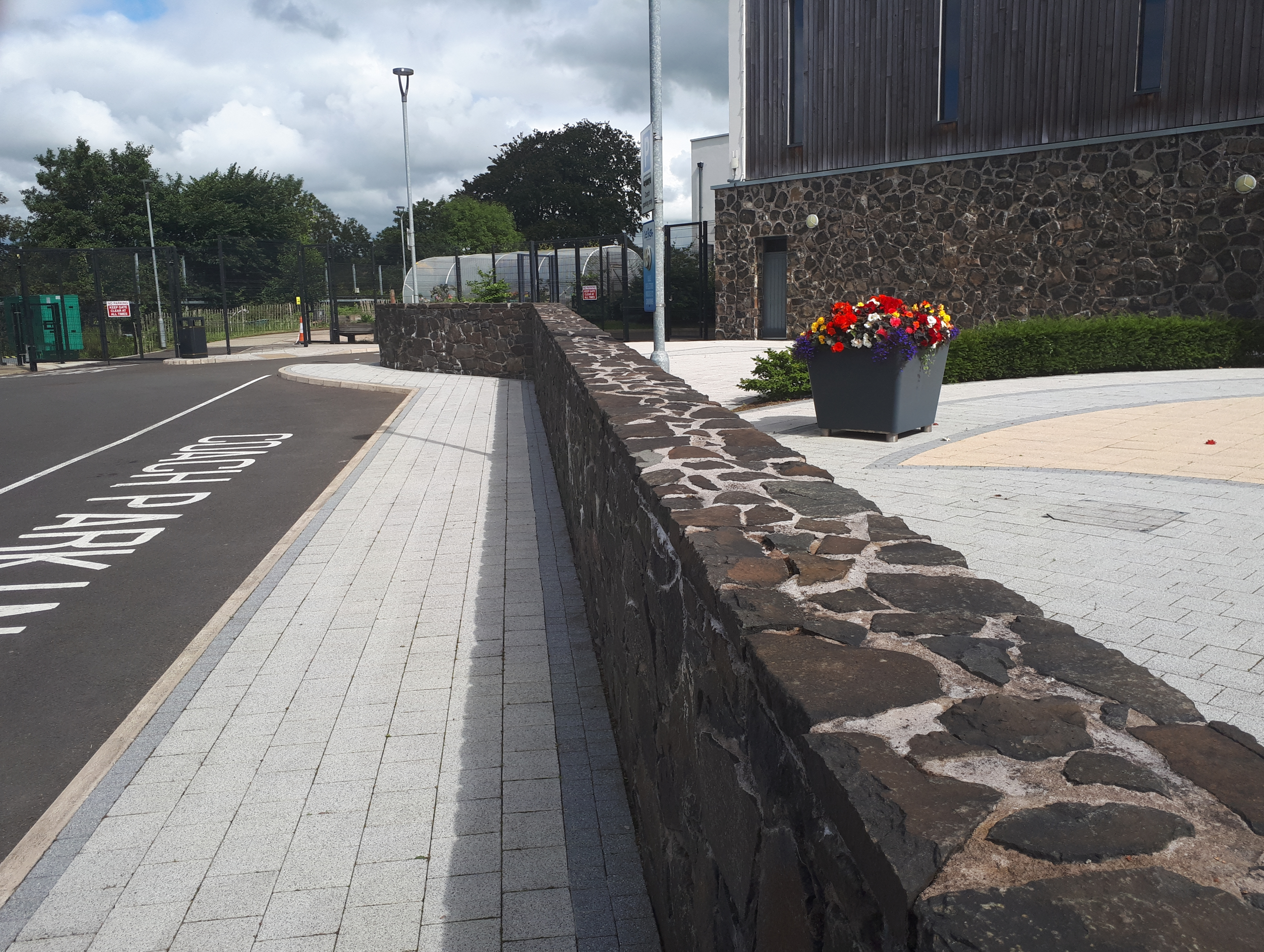
Picture of incorporated basalt stone wall, August 2023

The building incorporates the basalt stone that made the wall of the barracks in its facade and surrounding walls. It intends to combine both modern and historical architecture, with Rachel Cooke for The Observer describing it as "vaguely Scandinavian", using only stone, glass, and wood. The front landscaping is a paved circular area made "to encourage gatherings for community activity and performances." There is a car park specifically for the centre and a back yard.

=== Interior ===
It has two floors, containing the biographical and artistic exhibition titled Seamus Heaney: Man and Boy. (Note: A reference to Heaney's poem of the same name.) The first floor has a lobby with photographs of Heaney on the walls, and contains items such as a handwritten copy of Heaney's poem The Conway Stewart, Heaney's leather schoolbag, and his school desk. The second floor is described as an oblique approach to Heaney's life and work, containing a collection of mobiles of words he used in his poems. The Helicon (Note: A reference to Heaney's poem Personal Helicon.) is a 190-seat performance space situated in the rear side of the building. There is also a café.

== History ==
=== Construction ===
Construction began in January 2015, contracted to Brendan Loughran & Sons Ltd. It finished in September the following year and cost £4.25 million to complete.

=== Opening ===
The inaugural opening took place on the evening of September 29, 2016, attended by Heaney's surviving family, before opening to the public the following day. The opening festival was attended by singer-songwriter Paul Brady, and poets Michael Longley and Gerald Dawe.

=== Operation ===
The centre is managed by Heaney's nephew, Brian McCormick. It takes an estimated £500k to run annually.

It was visited by then Prince Charles and wife Camilla in May 2017 during their trip to Ireland. There, he gave a speech about Seamus Heaney and the centre:

What is so encouraging, too, is the way this centre, like Seamus Heaney's work itself, reaches out across different communities, different cultures and different nations, finding, as he did, a universal voice with the accent of a particular place.

— Charles, Prince of Wales, Seamus Heaney Homeplace: Speech; May 2017

In 2019, it had accumulated a debt of £1 million. The Mid Ulster Council went to the United States which an Irish News report claimed was an attempt to search for funding. This was denied by a spokesperson.

In 2021, the centre opened the Open Ground (Note: Similarly titled to Heaney's poetry collection, Opened Ground: Poems 1966-1996, a title connected to his farm boy roots.) exhibition, which allows visitors to go to five locations related to Heaney's poetry, from the Strand in Lough Beg to an alleyway in nearby Magherafelt. These locations provide "listening posts" where his poetry is read aloud and a panel where the poem is interpreted. It cost £750k to develop.

In March 2023, the HomePlace announced they would be holding an event on Seamus Heaney's 10th death anniversary. The event was held between August 25–27 and was attended by ten poets, including Paul Muldoon, Niall Campbell, Emma Must, and Owen Sheers. Musician Colm Mac Con Iomaire also performed at the event. The documentary Seamus Heaney and the Music of What Happens screened at the event, followed by a Q&A session with the director Adam Low and producer Martin Rosenbaum.

== Reception ==
Christopher Heaney, Seamus's son, said his father would have been "awed" by the centre.

It has won numerous awards, including the 2017 AHI Award, 2017 Excellence for Built Heritage Award, 2017 Best Local Authority Tourism Initiative, 2017 Best Visitor and Interpretation Centre, multiple Tripadvisor Travellers’ Choice Awards, and Tourism NI's 2022 Most Innovative Business (Large) award.

It received around 40,000 visitors in its first year.
