= Hobhouse baronets =

Baronetcy in the Baronetage of the United Kingdom

Escutcheon of the Hobhouse baronets of Chantry House and Westbury College

The Hobhouse Baronetcy, of Chantry House in the parish of Bradford-on-Avon in the County of Wiltshire and of Westbury College in the County of Gloucester, is a title in the Baronetage of the United Kingdom. It was created on 22 December 1812 for Benjamin Hobhouse, a wealthy brewer and member of parliament for Bletchingley, Grampound and Hendon. His eldest son, the second Baronet, was a prominent writer and Liberal politician and notably served as Chief Secretary for Ireland and as President of the Board of Control. In 1851 he was raised to the peerage as Baron Broughton, of Broughton-de-Gyffard in the County of Wiltshire. However, he had no sons and on his death the barony became extinct, while he was succeeded in the baronetcy by his nephew, the third Baronet. The latter's son, the fourth Baronet, was also a noted Liberal politician and held office as Chancellor of the Duchy of Lancaster and as Postmaster General.

Thomas Hobhouse, son of the first Baronet by his second wife, was a politician.

== Hobhouse baronets, of Chantry House and Westbury College (1812) ==
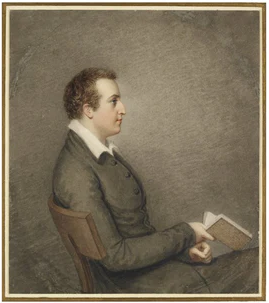
John Cam Hobhouse, 1818 portrait

- Sir Benjamin Hobhouse, 1st Baronet (1757–1831)
- Sir John Cam Hobhouse, 2nd Baronet (1786–1869) (created Baron Broughton in 1851)

== Barons Broughton (1851) ==
- John Cam Hobhouse, 1st Baron Broughton (1786–1869)

== Hobhouse baronets, of Chantry House and Westbury College (1812; Reverted) ==
- Sir Charles Parry Hobhouse, 3rd Baronet (1825–1916)
- Sir Charles Edward Henry Hobhouse, 4th Baronet (1862–1941)
- Sir Reginald Arthur Hobhouse, 5th Baronet (1878–1947)
- Sir Charles Chisholm Hobhouse, 6th Baronet (1906–1991)
- Sir Charles John Spinney Hobhouse, 7th Baronet (b. 1962)

The heir apparent is the present holder's son Benjamin Charles Spinney Hobhouse (b. 2009).

== Notes ==
Baronetage of the United Kingdom
Preceded by Falkiner baronets	Hobhouse baronets of Chantry House; 22 December 1812	Succeeded by Bruce baronets
