= Harry Bruce =

Harry Bruce may refer to:

- Harry Bruce (writer) (1934–2024), Canadian writer and journalist
- Harry Bruce (academic), professor and Dean of the Information School at the University of Washington
- Harry Bruce (politician) (1868–1958), Australian politician
- Harry Bruce (footballer, born 1905) (1905–?), English footballer
- Harry Bruce (Australian footballer) (1895–1977), Australian footballer for Melbourne

== See also ==
- Henry Bruce (disambiguation)
