= Henry Bruce (Royal Navy officer, born 1792) =

Royal Navy Admiral; Commander-in-Chief, Portsmouth (1792–1863)

Admiral Sir Henry Bruce KCB
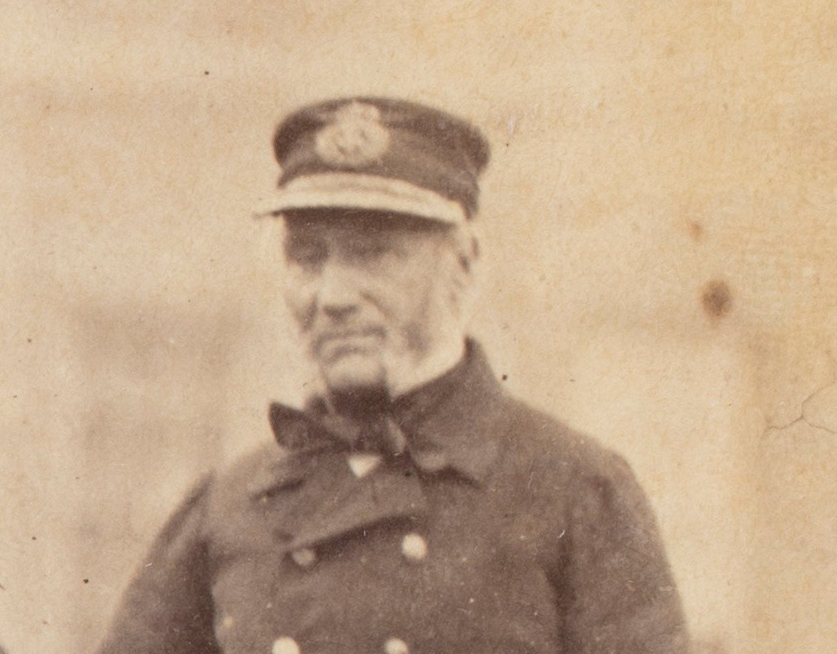
- Henry William Bruce, Portsmouth, Britain, c. 1860.
- Born: 2 February 1792
- Died: 14 December 1863 (aged 71); Liverpool, United Kingdom
- Relatives: Sir James Bruce, 2nd Baronet (brother)
- Military career
- Allegiance: United Kingdom
- Branch: Royal Navy
- Service years: 1803–1863
- Rank: Admiral
- Commands: HMS Britannia; HMS Imogene; HMS Agincourt; HMS Queen; Pacific Station; Portsmouth Command
- Conflicts: Napoleonic Wars; Battle of Trafalgar; War of 1812; Crimean War
- Awards: Knight Commander of the Order of the Bath

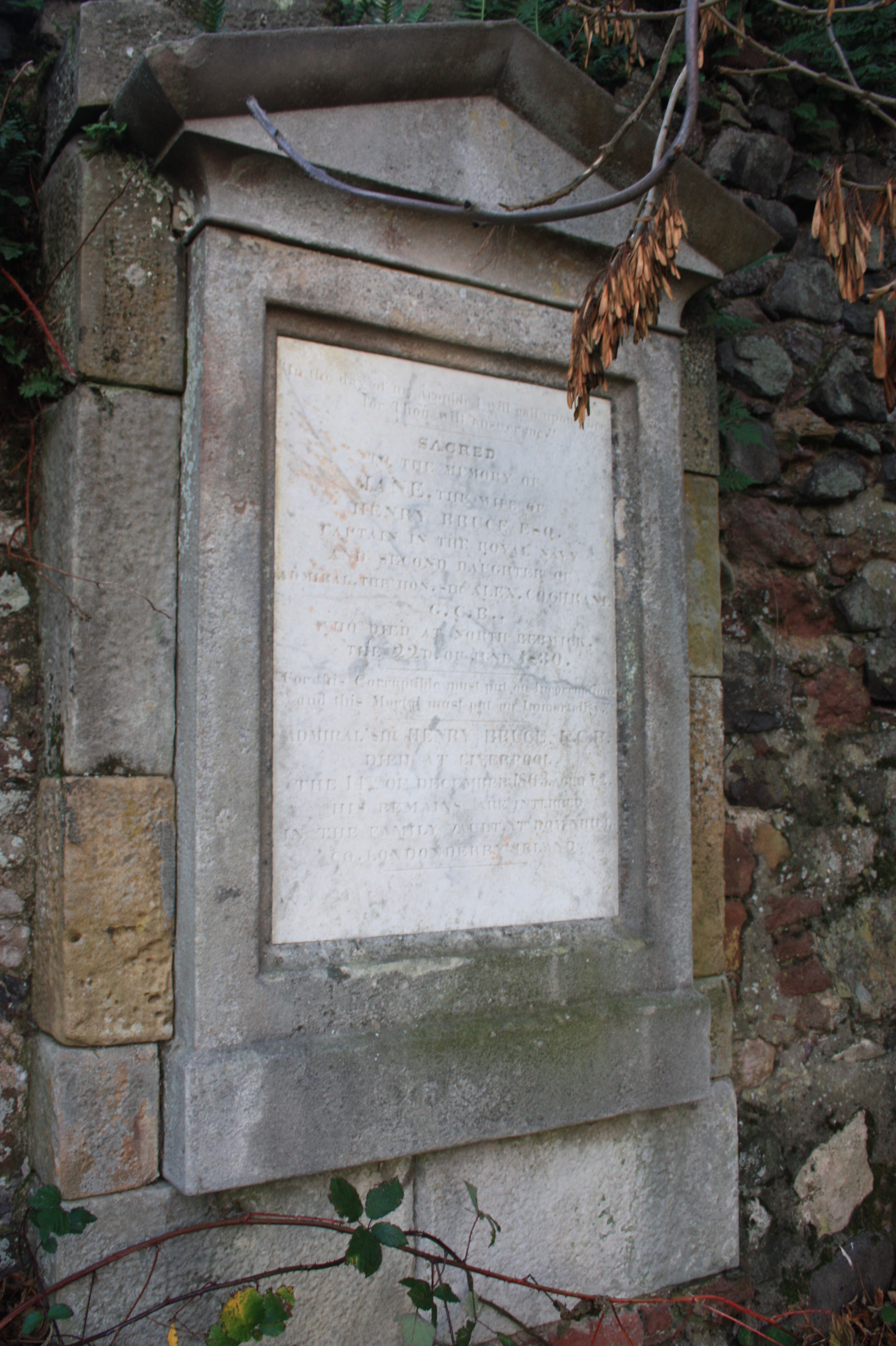
Memorial to Admiral Henry Bruce, North Berwick Churchyard

Admiral Sir Henry William Bruce, KCB (2 February 1792 – 14 December 1863) was a Royal Navy officer who went on to be Commander-in-Chief, Portsmouth.

== Early life ==
Born the second son of Sir Henry Hervey Aston Bruce, 1st Baronet and the former Letitia Barnard (a daughter of Rev. Dr. Henry Barnard and Mary Canning). His elder brother was Sir James Bruce, 2nd Baronet. His maternal uncle was Gen. Sir Andrew Barnard.

== Career ==
Bruce joined the Royal Navy in 1803. He took part in the Battle of Trafalgar in 1805. He also took part in the War of 1812. He became Captain of HMS Britannia in 1823, of HMS Imogene in 1836, of HMS Agincourt in 1842 and of HMS Queen in 1847.

In 1851 he was appointed Commodore of the West Africa Squadron. He negotiated and signed the Treaty Between Great Britain and Lagos of 1 January 1852. In 1852 he was promoted to rear-admiral. Then in 1854, as Commander-in-Chief, Pacific Station, he founded a military hospital at Esquimalt. He was promoted to vice-admiral in 1857. He was appointed Commander-in-Chief, Portsmouth in 1860. He was appointed a Knight Commander of the Order of the Bath (KCB) in 1861. He was promoted to admiral in 1863.

== Personal life ==
In 1822 he married Jane Cochrane, daughter of Adm. Hon. Sir Alexander Cochrane (a son of the 8th Earl of Dundonald). Before her death in 1830, they were the parents of:

- Alexander Hervey Bruce (d. 1874), a Lt.-Col. in the Bengal Staff Corps who married Elizabeth Julia Mackinnon.
- Henry Stewart Beresford Bruce (1824–1908), a Lt.-Col. in the 2nd Lancashire Militia who married Marriette Hill, daughter of John Hill of Bellaghy Castle, County Londonderry, in 1846. After her death in 1886, he married her sister, Frances Jane Augusta (née Hill) Moran, widow of Edward Moran, in 1894.

In 1832, following the death of his first wife, he married Louisa Mary Minchin Dalrymple, a daughter of Col. George Dalrymple. Together, they were the parents of:

- James Minchin Bruce (1833–1901), a Rear-Admiral who married Elizabeth Lucas Hill, daughter of John Hill, in 1856.

He lived at Ballyscullion in Northern Ireland. He died in Liverpool on 14 December 1863 while still serving as a naval officer and was interred in the family vault at Downhill in Northern Ireland.

=== Legacy ===
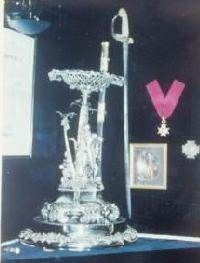
Sir Henry William Bruce silver plate and sword in Bruce Neuk at the Britannia Yacht Club in Ottawa, Ontario

He is memorialised on the family gravestone in the south-east corner of North Berwick parish churchyard.

"This piece of silver plate was presented to Sir Henry William Bruce by his Captains, Commanders, and Lieutenants in 1854 as a token of their grateful sense of his uniform, kindness and consideration to themselves, the officers and ship's companies under their command, during the period they had the pleasure of serving under him on the West Coast of Africa".

== See also ==
- O'Byrne, William Richard (1849). "Bruce, Henry William" . A Naval Biographical Dictionary . John Murray – via Wikisource.

Military offices
Preceded by Sir David Price	Commander-in-Chief, Pacific Station; 1854–1857	Succeeded by Sir Robert Baynes
Preceded by Sir William Bowles	Commander-in-Chief, Portsmouth; 1860–1863	Succeeded by Sir Michael Seymour
