= Bellaghy Bawn =

Bawn in Bellaghy, Northern Ireland

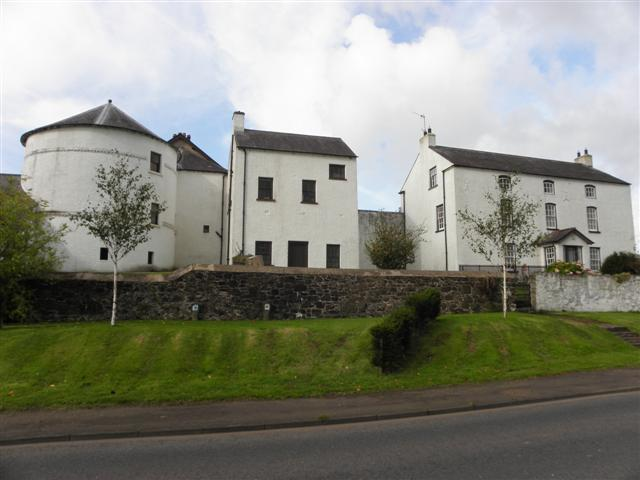
- Bellaghy Bawn, September 2011
- Former names: Vintner's Hall
- Alternative names: Bellaghy Castle

General information
- Type: Fortified house, bawn
- Address: 20 Castle St, Bellaghy, Magherafelt BT45 8LA
- Country: Northern Ireland
- Coordinates: 54°48′21.36″N 6°31′6.03″W
- Year(s) built: 1614–1619
- Owner: Northern Ireland Environment Agency

Listed Building – Grade B+
- Type: Castle
- Designated: April 21, 1974
- Reference no.: HB08/09/001 A

Bellaghy Bawn is a fortified house and bawn in Bellaghy, County Londonderry, Northern Ireland.

Construction began in c. 1614 under John Rowley. After Rowley's death in 1617, the bawn's construction was continued by Baptist Jones (died c. 1623). The original bawn burned down during the 1641 Irish Rebellion and was rebuilt in 1643. It has received extensions since. It became a museum in 1996.

== Site ==
Bellaghy stands on basalt formed from Cretaceous-era olivine basalt lava. Bellaghy Bawn was built where an Early Christian ringfort stood, but it is unlikely those who built the bawn were aware of this.

== Architecture ==
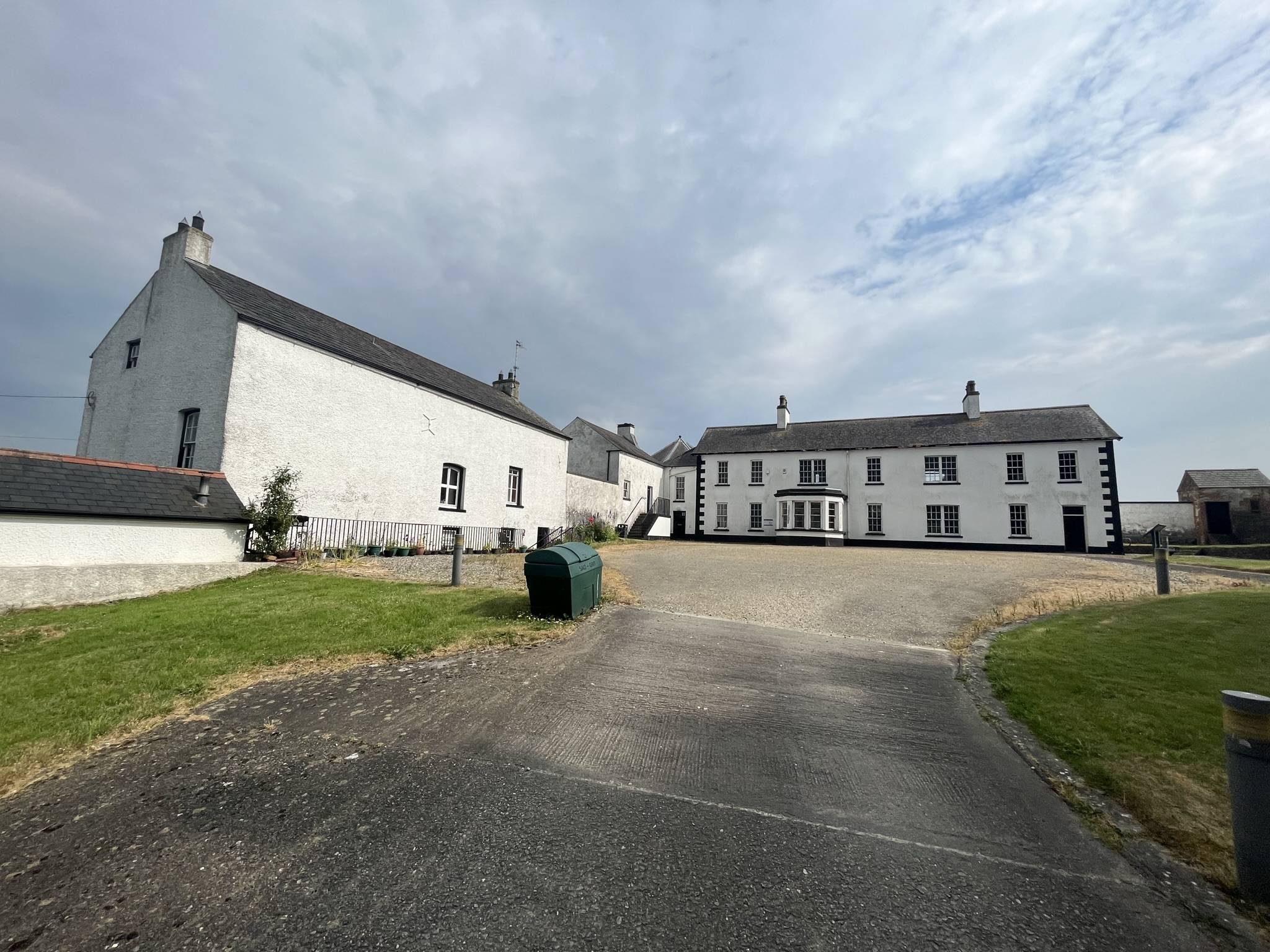
Bellaghy Bawn courtyard, June 2023

The original bawn was square-shaped, 100 square feet (9.29 m^{2}) in area, with two large towers diagonally opposite one another with two-story blocks extended from each. It consisted of mostly red incorporated diatomite-clay brick and limestone, with 3 ft stone footings.

The modern-day bawn was constructed in the 18th century, incorporating the original south-east flanker tower. In the south-west, there is a brick tower, however it is thought that said tower was only built as a replacement of a timber structure. The bawn is a B+-listed monument.

== History ==
During the reign of King James VI and I, the Plantation of Ulster was the 17th-century colonisation of Ulster, the northern province in Ireland, by the English Crown. The plantation consisted of six official counties—Donegal, Londonderry, Tyrone, Fermanagh, Cavan and Armagh—and the two unplanted counties of Antrim and Down. County Londonderry was chartered by The Honourable The Irish Society, a consortium of London livery companies.

=== Vintners Company ===
The Vintners Company settled the village of Bellaghy (Note: The Vintners attempted to rename the settlement "Vintners Town", but were generally unsuccessful.) during the early 1600s. John Rowley and Baptist Jones were given around 3,200 acres by the Vintners in the area. Bellaghy Bawn began construction under Rowley c. 1614, however he died in 1617 and the construction was continued under Jones. Under Jones, the bawn was garrisoned by 76 men. After Jones died indebted to the Vintners c. 1623, it was owned by Henry Conway, who married Jones's widow and inherited his debt, which was over £300, equivalent to £69,706 in 2023. It was originally called "Vintner's Hall".

The original bawn was destroyed during the 1641 Irish Rebellion, before being rebuilt three years later by Sir John Clotworthy. While Magherafelt was under attack during the rebellion by Cormac O'Hagan, leader of defence Robert Waringe requested arms and ammunition from Conway, who declined. The bawn would house the refugees after Magherafelt fell until it too fell. Henry Conway, along with his family, fled Bellaghy after the town's destruction after arranging with rebel Sir Féilim Ruadh Ó Néill his safe escape. Where the Conways fled to is unknown.

In 1832, a dispensary was established at the building by the Vintners. It was usually staffed by one dispensary doctor and one surgeon, with the doctor receiving an annual salary of £45, equivalent to £5,281 in 2023. Dr. George Thompson, from Coagh in County Tyrone, worked for the dispensary until 1925. He is reported to be the first person in Bellaghy to own a car, purchased in 1912. The dispensary closed in 1948 due to the establishment of the National Health Service.

The bawn was occupied by residents until 1987 when it fell into state care.

=== Museum ===
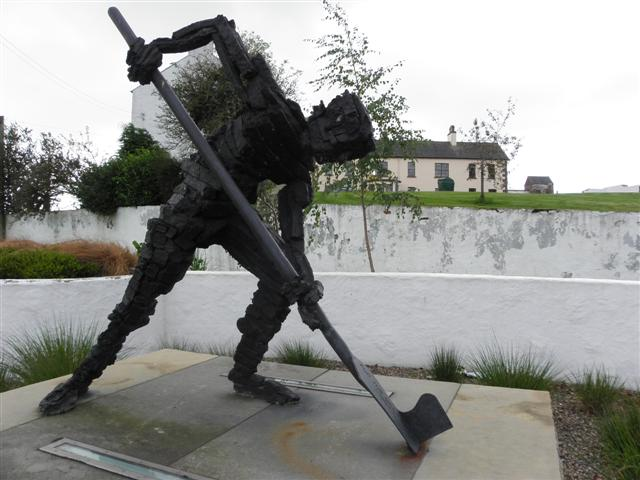
The Turf Man by David Annand, September 2011

The bawn was converted into a historical museum and opened in 1996. There is also a community and crafts centre about Seamus Heaney, which contains various poem manuscripts and a 20-minute film directed by David Hammond where Heaney describes how the local area influenced his poetry.

On December 20, 2000, a curator at the centre reported manuscripts totalling £8,000 in value were stolen. Joseph Patrick Kelly (35), a former employee at the Bawn, was charged and pleaded guilty for the theft after the Bawn were made aware of an advertisement in a magazine where Kelly was attempting to sell the manuscripts. Police searched Kelly's home, found the stolen items, and returned them intact to the centre.

In 2009, a bronze sculpture titled Turf Man by David Annand was unveiled at the bawn. The sculpture is a reference to Heaney's poem Digging. It also contained the Seamus Heaney Reference Library, however the items were moved into the newly built Seamus Heaney HomePlace in 2016.

==== Excavations ====
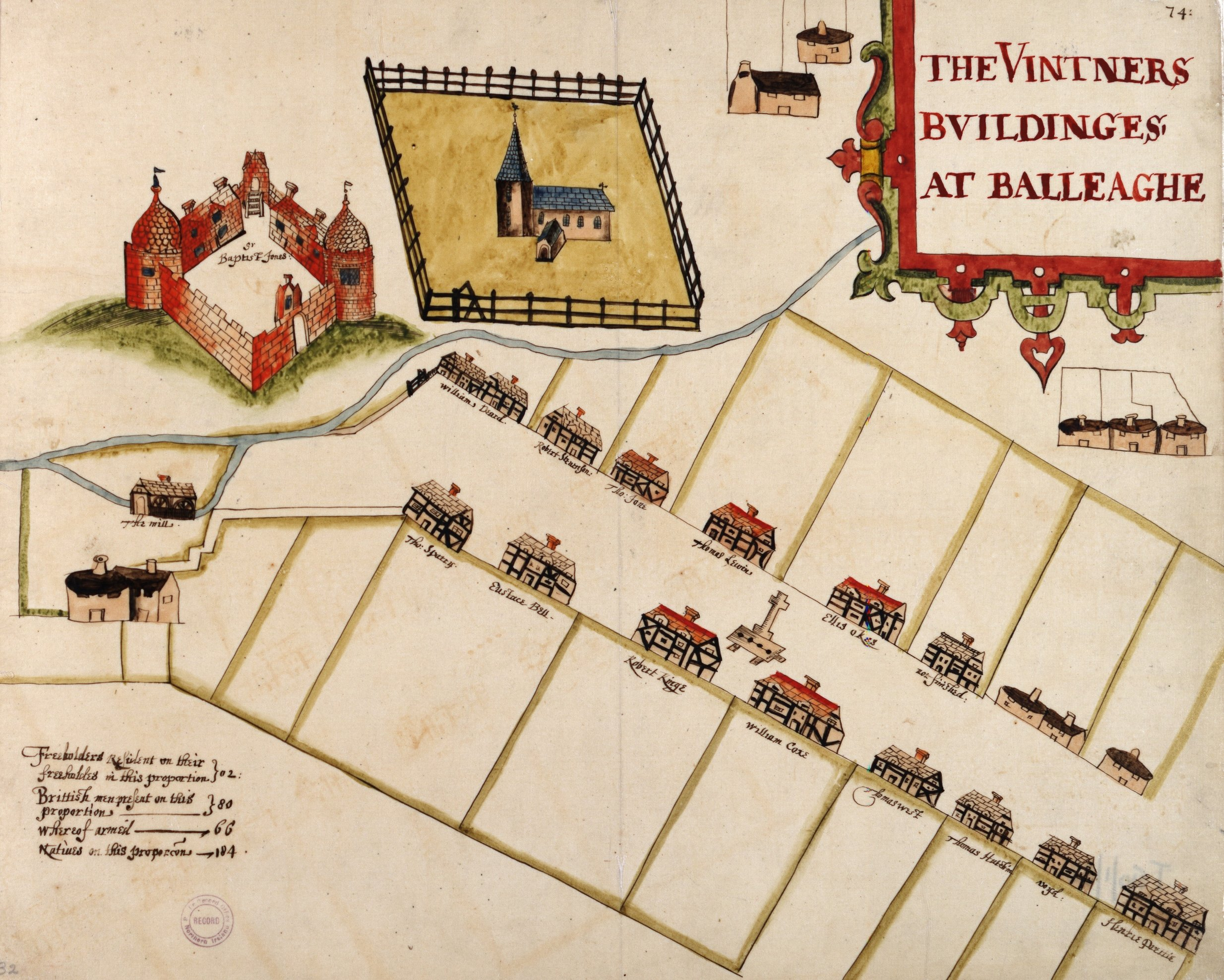
19th century reproduction of 1622 map by Thomas Raven. Bellaghy Bawn can be seen in top-left.

The site has been excavated multiple times since coming into state care.

The site was first excavated in 1989 by N.F. Brannon, who did further work at the site the following year, in-collaboration with the DENI Historic Monuments and Buildings Branch. In his reports, he notes the discovery of stone footings which he concludes belonged to a two-room structure that was razed to the ground during the 17th century, with further damage caused by 18-19th gardening at the site. A portion of the bawn wall, near the south-west tower, was also exposed during the excavation, however he concludes in his 1990 report that it was likely a "secondary feature, built no later than 1760." Various ceramic artefacts, dating to the 17-18th century, were also recovered during both excavations.

In 1995, further excavations were done by Declan P. Hurl which unveiled further 18th century metalled stone footings and a pit. More artefacts were discovered during this venture, including a wig-curler.

It would not be until 2009 that another excavation took place, under Brian Sloan with Queen's University Belfast on behalf of the NIEA. The main objective was to involve local primary schools in the excavation. Eight local schools participated, with over 250 school children taking part. Two 10 m × 2 m (32.8 ft × 6.6 ft) trenches were dug in fields rear of the building, with a third planned but not done, between June 1–12th after a preliminary geophysical survey the previous month showed high and low resistance anomalies. "Trench One", located in the east side of the closer eastern field ("Field One"), uncovered numerous small artefacts which indicated the presence of an 18th-century orchard and gravel pathway. "Trench Two", located in the north-western corner of "Field One", uncovered no archaeological findings. Sloan returned in 2012 to monitor the excavation of two trenches which were done to install drainage pipes. The trenches were located between the south-eastern turret of the monument and the 19th century "doctor's house". Only "Trench Two" uncovered something of archaeological interest: a sub-surface section of wall belonging to the north-western turret depicted in Raven's 1622 map of Bellaghy and the bawn.
