= Deerpark Cottage =

- Alternative names: Katie's Cottage

General information
- Type: Cottage
- Architectural style: Rural Irish vernacular
- Address: 28 Deerpark Rd, Bellaghy, Magherafelt BT45 8LB
- Country: Northern Ireland
- Coordinates: 54°47′56.76″N 6°30′53.1″W
- Year(s) built: 1820–1839
- Renovated: September 2016–June 2017
- Renovation cost: £156,000
- Owner: Mary McGeough

Technical details
- Floor count: 1.5
- Floor area: 194 m^{2} (2,090 sq ft)

Renovating team
- Architect(s): Patrick Bradley Architects
- Quantity surveyor: Ad Group
- Main contractor: Peter McErlain Limited Building Contractors

Listed Building – Grade B+
- Type: House
- Designated: September 15, 1978
- Reference no.: HB08/09/010

Deerpark Cottage (also known as Katie's Cottage) is a restored thatched cottage near Bellaghy, County Londonderry, Northern Ireland. Built in the early 19th century, it is a Grade B+ building.

== Architecture ==
The rural vernacular cottage has a floor area of 194 m^{2} (2,090 sq ft) and stands 1 1/2 stories tall. It contains a reception hall, a kitchen/dining area, a utility room, a double and a single bedroom, and a wet room. Its thatched roof is made of 400 mm (1.3 ft)+ long straw placed on sod, with walls made of stone finished with a lime render.

== History ==
The cottage was originally built in the early 19th century and owned by the McKenna family until Kathleen "Katie" McKenna's death in 2002. It fell into ruin, with the original thatched roof collapsing and waterlogging the building. In 2016, at the request of Katie's niece Mary, the building was restored and modernized between September and June the following year. The renovation was done by Patrick Bradley Architects and contracted by Peter McErlain Limited Building Contractors, with the thatching done by Kieran Agnew. The renovation cost £156,000 and was funded by the Department for Communities.
