= Edward Litton (1787–1870) =

Edward Litton PC (1787 – 22 January 1870) was an Irish Conservative politician. From 1837 to 1843 he was member of parliament (MP) for Coleraine, in the House of Commons of the United Kingdom of Great Britain and Ireland.

Litton was elected to the Parliament at the general election in 1837, regaining for the Conservatives a seat which had been won by the Liberals in 1835. He was re-elected unopposed in 1841, but left Parliament in 1843 to take up an appointment as Master of Chancery in Ireland.

== Related people ==
Litton's great-grandson (through George and grandson John), Henry Litton, is a retired Court of Final Appeal judge in Hong Kong.

Another grandson through George, George So Litton, was the founder of the Litton Mills in Pasig, the Philippines, while one of his great-grandsons through George So is Johnny Litton.

Parliament of the United Kingdom
| Preceded by William Taylor Copeland | Member of Parliament for Coleraine; 1837 – 1843 | Succeeded by John Boyd |
