= Bruce Stewart =

Bruce Stewart may refer to:

- Bruce Stewart (cricketer) (born 1949), New Zealand cricketer
- Bruce Stewart (playwright) (1936–2017), New Zealand fiction writer and dramatist
- Bruce Stewart (rugby league) (1941–2012), Australian rugby league footballer
- Bruce Stewart (scriptwriter) (1925–2005), television scriptwriter
- Bruce Stewart (racing driver) (born 1939), Australian racing driver

== See also ==
- Bruce Hylton-Stewart (1891–1972), played first-class cricket for Somerset and Cambridge University between 1912 and 1914
- Bruce Stuart (1881–1961), Canadian ice hockey player
- Stewart Bruce (disambiguation)
- Stewart (name)
