= Sir James Bruce, 2nd Baronet =

Irish soldier

Sir James Robertson Bruce, 2nd Baronet (6 September 1788 - 22 April 1836) was an Irish soldier.

The son of Sir Henry Hervey Aston Bruce, 1st Baronet, he was an officer in the Royal Horse Artillery at Waterloo. He was a Vice-Lieutenant of County Londonderry.

Baronetage of the United Kingdom
Preceded by Henry Bruce	Baronet (of Downhill); 1822–1836	Succeeded by Henry Bruce
