= Ballyscullion =

Village in County Londonderry, Northern Ireland

- Village and civil parish
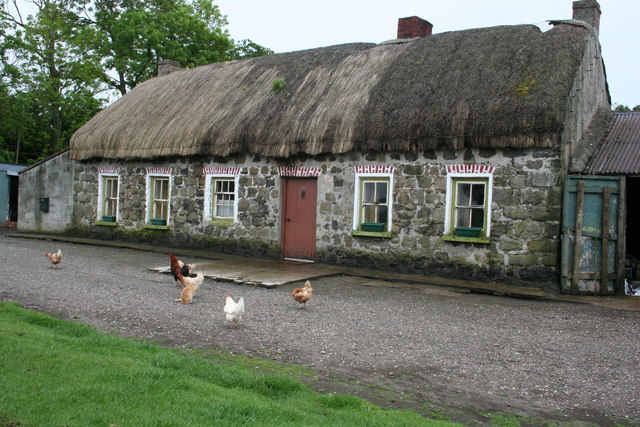

- Location within Northern Ireland
- Coordinates: 55.138°N 6.947°W
- Country: United Kingdom
- Province: Northern Ireland
- County: Londonderry

Population (2001)
  - Total: 291

Ballyscullion (from Irish Baile Uí Scuillín 'Ó Scullín's townland') is a small village and civil parish in County Londonderry, Northern Ireland. In the 2001 census it had a population of 291 people. The civil parish of Ballyscullion covers areas of County Antrim as well as County Londonderry. The village is situated within Mid-Ulster District.

== People ==
Increase Mather served as a minister at St. Tida's Church, Ballyscullion in the late 1650s until 1659. Frederick Hervey, 4th Earl of Bristol, known as "The Earl-Bishop", was Bishop of Cloyne from 1767 to 1768, and as Bishop of Derry from 1768 to 1803. He built Downhill House and Ballyscullion House, residences which he adorned with rare works of art.

== See also ==
- List of towns and villages in Northern Ireland
- List of civil parishes of County Londonderry
- List of civil parishes of County Antrim
