= Killing of Sean Brown =

1997 killing in Northern Ireland

Sean Brown
- Born: 20 April 1936; Near Bellaghy, County Londonderry, Northern Ireland
- Died: 12 May 1997 (aged 61); Near Randalstown, County Antrim, Northern Ireland
- Spouse: Bridie Brown (m. 1966)
- Children: 6

On 12 May 1997, Sean Brown, a 61-year-old married father of six and Gaelic Athletic Association (GAA) official, was abducted and killed by the Loyalist Volunteer Force (LVF) in Northern Ireland. Masked men abducted him from outside Bellaghy Wolfe Tones GAA club, hijacked his car and drove him to a spot ten miles away, where they shot him and set the car on fire. Brown was a Catholic and his killing, during the last years of the Troubles, is regarded as a sectarian attack against the Catholic and Irish nationalist community.

His killing remains unsolved. The inquest has faced repeated delays and disclosure issues, leading the coroner to request a public inquiry in 2024. In 2025, the Court of Appeal ruled that the government's refusal to establish one was unlawful, prompting renewed public calls for an inquiry. Brown's life, work and the circumstances of his death were later examined in Garbhan Downey's 2026 book A Bitter Harvest.

== Background ==
Sean Brown was born on 20 April 1936 in a rural area outside Bellaghy, County Londonderry, where his father worked at a local clay factory. He attended Magherafelt Technical College after being unable to pursue grammar school because of financial constraints. His early employment included work on a dairy farm and in local manufacturing, followed by night classes that led to qualifications in engineering. During this time, he met Bridie, whom he married in 1966; the couple had six children.

Brown worked in the production of aircraft components before becoming an instructor at the Institute of Mechanical Engineering at Ballymena Training Centre. There, he taught welding and engineering apprentices for more than three decades. He was actively involved in Bellaghy Wolfe Tones Gaelic athletic club throughout his adult life, joining the club's committee as a young man and later serving as assistant treasurer and chairman. During his tenure, the club cleared significant debts, built a new clubhouse and sports hall, and relaid its football pitch. He also supported cultural activities such as Irish dancing and traditional music classes.

In the general election on 1 May 1997, the local MP, William McCrea of the Democratic Unionist Party (DUP), lost his seat to Martin McGuinness of Sinn Féin. McCrea said that the people of Mid Ulster would "reap a bitter harvest" for the vote. Irish nationalists accused him of encouraging loyalist paramilitaries. A few months before, McCrea had spoken at a rally in support of loyalist militant Billy Wright, leader of the Loyalist Volunteer Force (LVF).

== Abduction and killing ==
On 12 May 1997, Brown, in his role as chairman, attended a rescheduled Gaelic football match at the club grounds. The fixture delayed the weekly committee meeting, which ended around 11:15 pm. Brown's son left the club at 11:25 pm, while Brown stayed to set the security alarm and lock the clubhouse and the main gates leading to Ballyscullion Road. He typically followed his son home within minutes to their nearby residence.

Brown set the security alarm at 11:27 pm. After moving his red Ford Sierra to the roadside, Brown was assaulted at the gates between 11:32 and 11:35 pm by several masked individuals. He was forced into the boot of his car, which was then driven away in a three-car convoy. The lead car, a Vauxhall Cavalier, carried false registration plates; a white Ford Escort followed as a support vehicle. The convoy crossed the River Bann and passed Toome police station at 11:41:06 pm, about five miles away. Police later said that the Ford Escort did not continue with the rest of the convoy into County Antrim.

The cars travelled a further 5.2 miles along the A6 to a remote laneway near the M2 motorway outside Randalstown. Brown was removed from the car, shot six times in the head, and the vehicle was set alight. The fire was reported to Randalstown police station at 11:45 pm, less than a mile from the scene. Royal Ulster Constabulary (RUC) officers found Brown's body lying behind the burnt-out car, partially burned by the flames.

Brown had been driven 10.2 miles from County Londonderry into County Antrim, a 10–15 minute journey, though witnesses described the convoy as travelling at speed. One theory suggested the location was chosen to symbolically link the killing to the funeral of RUC officer Darren Bradshaw, who had been killed by the INLA and was buried in nearby Antrim that day. The theory was that Brown's killing was carried out in retaliation.

== Aftermath ==
The Loyalist Volunteer Force (LVF) issued a statement claiming responsibility for the killing. The LVF falsely claimed that Brown had campaigned for Martin McGuinness and had been involved in re-routing an Orange Order march in Bellaghy. It said it would "target the GAA on both sides of the border if any more parades are re-routed". His family said he was not involved in politics or parade disputes, and was friendly with local Protestants.

The award-winning poet Seamus Heaney, from Bellaghy, wrote to The Irish News paying tribute to Brown as a friend and respected community leader. Heaney mentioned Brown's murder in his poem "The Augean Stables" (2000).

Artist's impression of the female suspect broadcast on Crimewatch in 2005.

No one has been charged. A witness came forward shortly after the murder, reporting that he had seen a white Vauxhall Nova parked near the Bellaghy GAA grounds with a woman in the driver's seat and two men beside her, hiding their faces. The witness recalled that the woman stared straight at him. He later identified her in an identity parade, but she was released without charge. An artist's impression of the suspect was broadcast on Crimewatch in June 2005. In June 2025, the witness publicly recounted the sighting for the first time, reiterating details previously shared with investigators and featured in the earlier broadcast.

The case has remained unresolved for decades, with the inquest, opened in March 2023, subject to repeated delays and disclosure issues. In March 2024, the coroner halted the inquest and requested a public inquiry, citing national security restrictions that prevented a fair hearing. The UK government did not establish an inquiry, and on 3 April 2025, the Court of Appeal ruled that this was unlawful. On 16 May, thousands of people joined a "Walk for Truth" march in Bellaghy, calling for a public inquiry into Brown's murder. The government has since sought leave to appeal to the UK Supreme Court. In October 2026, the Supreme Court reserved judgment on the government's appeal.
