= Benjamin Hobhouse =

English politician

Sir Benjamin Hobhouse, 1st Baronet
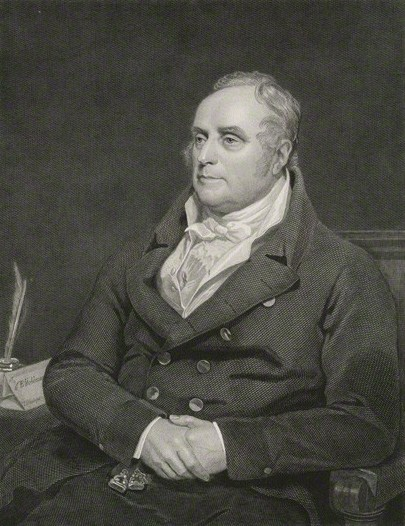
- Sir Benjamin Hobhouse, 1825 engraving
- Born: 1757
- Died: August 14, 1831 (aged 73–74); Berkeley Square, London, England
- Education: Bristol Grammar School, Brasenose College, Oxford (BA, MA)
- Occupations: Politician, lawyer, writer
- Title: Baronet (1st Baronet of Chantry House)
- Term: 22 December 1812 – 14 August 1831
- Predecessor: Created
- Successor: Sir John Cam Hobhouse
- Spouses: Charlotte Cam (m. 1785; d. 1791); Amelia Parry (m. 1793)
- Children: 19 total (including John Cam Hobhouse)
- Parent: John Hobhouse
- Relatives: Isaac Hobhouse (uncle)

Sir Benjamin Hobhouse, 1st Baronet (1757–1831) was an English politician. He served as Member of Parliament from 1797 to 1818.

== Life ==
The son of John Hobhouse, a slave trader and merchant at Bristol (and nephew to Isaac Hobhouse), he received his education at Bristol grammar school and Brasenose College, Oxford, where he graduated B.A. in 1778. In 1781 he proceeded M.A., and was called to the bar at the Middle Temple.

At the general election of 1796 Hobhouse stood for parliament at Bristol without success, but in February 1797 he was elected M.P. for Bletchingley in Surrey, in 1802 for Grampound in Cornwall, and in 1806 for Hindon in Wiltshire. He then represented Hindon till he withdrew from political life in 1818. In 1803 he took office under Henry Addington as secretary to the board of control. He resigned this post in May 1804, and in 1805 was appointed chairman of the committees for supplies. He was also first commissioner for investigating the debts of the nabobs of the Carnatic.

Hobhouse was made a baronet on 22 December 1812. He was president of the Bath and West of England Society (1805–17), chairman of the committee of the Literary Fund, and a fellow of the Royal Society and of the Society of Antiquaries of London. He was elected a Foreign Honorary Member of the American Academy of Arts and Sciences in 1818. He died in Berkeley Square on 14 August 1831.

== Works ==
Hobhouse wrote:

- A Treatise on Heresy as cognisable by the Spiritual Courts, and an Examination of the Statute of William III for Suppressing Blasphemy and Profaneness, 1792.
- A Reply to F. Randolph's Letter to Dr. Priestley; or an Examination of F. Randolph's Scriptural Revision of Socinian Arguments, Trowbridge, 1792; another edition, Bath, 1793. Answered by Francis Randolph in Scriptural Revision of Socinian Arguments, vindicated against the Reply of Benjamin Hobhouse, 1793.
- Three letters addressed to "the several Patriotic Societies in London and its neighbourhood" and to the editor of the Morning Chronicle, occasioned by the "prevailing disposition to riot and insurrection", 1792.
- An Inquiry into what constitutes the Crime of compassing and imagining the King's Death, 1795.
- Remarks on several parts of France, Italy, ... in the years 1783, 1784, and 1785, Bath, 1796.
- A collection of Tracts, 1797.

== Family ==
Hobhouse was twice married:

1. In September 1785, to Charlotte, daughter of Samuel Cam of Chantry House, near Bradford, Wiltshire; she died 25 November 1791;
2. In April 1793, to Amelia, daughter of Joshua Parry of Cirencester.

By his first wife he had five children, and by his second fourteen. His eldest son was John Cam Hobhouse.

== Notes ==
Attribution

This article incorporates text from a publication now in the public domain: Lee, Sidney, ed. (1891). "Hobhouse, Benjamin". Dictionary of National Biography. Vol. 27. London: Smith, Elder & Co.

Baronetage of the United Kingdom
New creation	Baronet (of Chantry House and Westbury College); 1812–1831	Succeeded by John Hobhouse
