= James Andrew Thomas Bruce =

Royal Navy Admiral (1846–1921)

Admiral Sir James Andrew Thomas Bruce KCMG
- Born: 15 July 1846
- Died: 25 May 1921 (aged 74)
- Relatives: Sir Henry Hervey Bruce, 3rd Baronet; Marianne Margaret Clifton (Parents)
- Military career
- Allegiance: United Kingdom
- Branch: Royal Navy
- Rank: Admiral

Admiral Sir James Andrew Thomas Bruce, KCMG (15 July 1846 – 25 May 1921) was an officer in the Royal Navy, who was second in command of the British fleet on the China Station during the Boxer Rebellion.

== Background ==
Bruce was born on 15 July 1846, the son of Rt. Hon. Sir Sir Henry Hervey Bruce, 3rd Baronet and Marianne Margaret Clifton.

== Naval career ==
He served in the Niger Campaign in 1871.

During the Boxer Rebellion, Rear-Admiral Bruce was second in command of British fleet on the China Station. His flagship was the battleship Barfleur, and his flag captain was George Warrender. Barfleur took part in Allied operations in north China in 1899 and 1900, and between 31 May 1900 and September 1900 supported the storming of the Peking forts and the relief of the foreign legations at Tientsin.

=== The British fleet during the Boxer rebellion ===
The British fleet on the China Station in March 1901 was commanded by Vice-Admiral Sir Edward H. Seymour, G.C.B. in the Centurion, with Rear-Admiral Sir James A.T. Bruce, K.C.M.G. second in command, and consisted of:

- Battleships: Barfleur, Centurion, Glory, Goliath, Ocean.
- 1st Class cruisers: Argonaut, Aurora, Blenheim, Endymion, Orlando , Terrible, Undaunted **.
- 2nd Class cruisers: Arethusa ‡, Astraea ‡, Bonaventure, Dido ‡, Hermione, lsis ‡, Pique.
- 3rd Class cruisers: Alacrity, Wallaroo ‡.
- Destroyers: Fame, Hart, Otter, Whiting.
- Sloops: Algerine, Daphne, Phoenix, Rosario.
- Gunvessel: Linnet.
- Gunboats: Bramble, Brisk, Britomart, Esk , Lizard ‡, Pigmy, Plover, Redpole.
- Storeship: Humber.
- Receiving ship Hong Kong: Tamar (flagship of the Commodore in charge at Hong Kong, Commodore Francis Powell, C.B)
- River steamers: Robin, Sandpiper, Snipe, Woodcock, Woodlark.

** Ordered home. ‡ Temporarily attached to China Station.

Bruce was appointed a Knight Commander of the Order of St. Michael and St. George (KCMG) in 1900 for his services in China.

Barfleur ended her China Station service in November 1901, departing Hong Kong on 11 November 1901 and arriving at Plymouth on 31 December 1901. She paid off at Devonport on 22 January 1902, and Sir James Bruce was received in audience by King Edward VII a week later.

== Later life ==
He died aged 74, on 25 May 1921.

== Family ==
He married Catherine Mary Philippa Wodehouse, daughter of Colonel Edwin Wodehouse and Catherine Street, on 27 June 1877. There were no children from this marriage. He had an illegitimate daughter, Olive Christian, by Susan Christian in 1874. Olive Christian married Algernon Samuel Wigmore of Cobham and Stoke D'Abernon, Surrey, in 1898. She died, aged 52, on 21 November 1926. Olive Christian Wigmore is interred in the Churchyard of Stoke D'Abernon.
