= Bruce baronets of Balcaskie (1668) =

Escutcheon of the Bruce baronets of Balcaskie

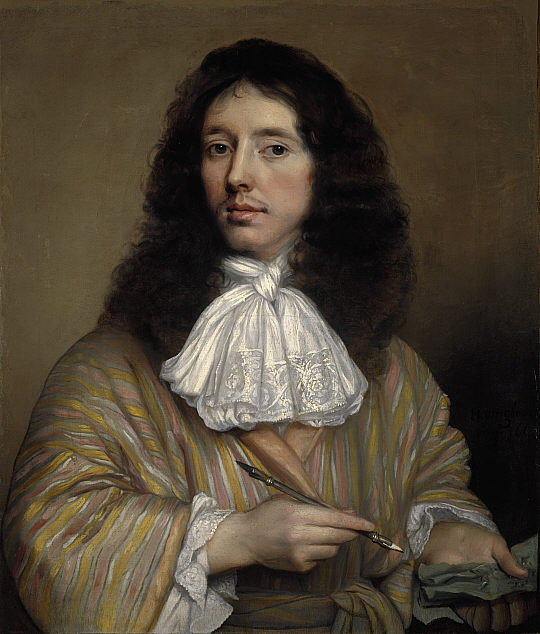
Sir William Bruce, 1st Baronet, of Balcaskie

The Bruce Baronetcy, of Balcaskie in Scotland, was created in the Baronetage of Nova Scotia on 21 October 1668 for the architect William Bruce. He was a descendant of Robert Bruce, brother of Edward Bruce, 1st Lord Bruce of Kinloss, ancestor of the Earls of Elgin. His son, the second Baronet, was one of the Scottish representatives to the 1st Parliament of Great Britain. The title became extinct on his death in 1711.

== Bruce baronets, of Balcaskie (1668) ==
- Sir William Bruce, 1st Baronet (c. 1630 – 1710)
- Sir John Bruce, 2nd Baronet (died 1711)
