= Lough Beg =

Lake near Lough Neagh, Northern Ireland

- Loch Beag (Irish)
- Location within Northern Ireland
- Location: Northern Ireland
- Coordinates: 54°47′50″N 6°28′30″W
- Basin countries: Northern Ireland

Ramsar Wetland
- Official name: Lough Neagh & Lough Beg
- Designated: 5 January 1976
- Reference no.: 74

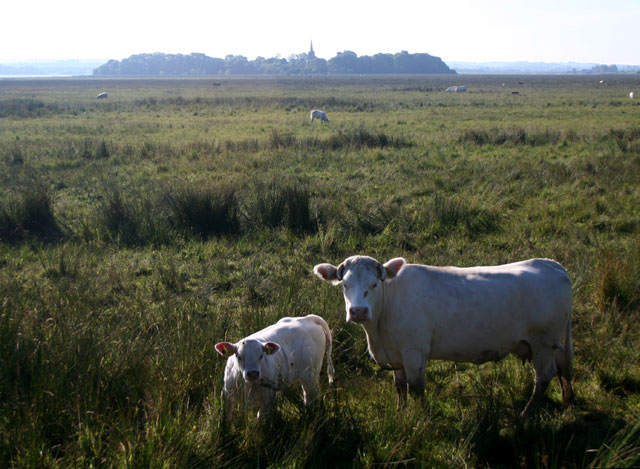
Cattle Grazing in the Lough Beg National Nature Reserve

Lough Beg (from Irish Loch Beag 'little lake') is a small freshwater lake north of Lough Neagh in Northern Ireland. The lake is located on the border between County Londonderry and County Antrim. The Lower Bann flows into it from Lough Neagh at the southern end and continues on its route to the sea from the northern end. Church Island which is on the lake was the site of a pre-Viking monastery and during the summer it is normally reachable by foot. Due to the area's many rare plants and it being a stopping point for migrating birds the area was protected as the Lough Beg National Nature Reserve. It is one of the main Irish breeding areas for the scarce Garganey.

== Church Island ==
Church Island is 1.5 mi (2.4 km) from Bellaghy; it is not a true island as it is usually accessible by foot, since the water in the lough has receded following the dredging of the River Bann in the 1930s. The church is reputed to date back to the time of Saint Patrick when he navigated the River Bann and founded a settlement. It has no spire, but there is a separate spire built beside it, erected so that Bishop Harvey, in the late 18th century, could see the spire from his home in Bellaghy. There is a famous stone, the Bullaun Stone, with a hollow that fills with water, which is said to have been worn down by the saint as he prayed. Pilgrims come to the island each year, on the first Sunday in September, to celebrate the feast of Saint Thaddeus.

== Ramsar site ==
Lough Neagh and Lough Beg are a nature reserve and have been designated as a Ramsar site. The reserve includes floodplains and marshes, as well as land used for grazing. The site is used by numerous species of resident and migratory waterbirds, including swans, geese and ducks. It is also of interest to botanists as the hooded lady's tresses orchid grows here, the Lough Neagh basin being one of the few locations in Ireland where it occurs.

== See also ==
- List of loughs in Ireland
- The Strand at Lough Beg by Irish poet Seamus Heaney
