= Daniel Taylor (politician) =

Daniel Taylor (1825–1889) was an Irish Liberal Party politician. He was Member of Parliament for Coleraine from 1874 to 1880.

Taylor was elected to the House of Commons at the 1874 general election, when he won the seat from the sitting Conservative MP Sir Henry Bruce in Coleraine's first contested election since 1847. Taylor's 1874 victory by 227 votes to 160 was overturned at the 1880 general election, when Bruce regained the seat by 222 votes to 193.

Parliament of the United Kingdom
Preceded by Sir Henry Bruce, Bt	Member of Parliament for Coleraine; 1874 – 1880	Succeeded by Sir Henry Bruce, Bt
