= John Boyd (Irish politician) =

Irish politician

John Boyd (1789 – 2 January 1862) was an Irish politician. He was elected as a Member of Parliament (MP) for Coleraine in 1843, and resigned on 16 March 1852 through appointment as Steward of the Chiltern Hundreds. He was again elected for the same constituency in 1857, but died in office on 2 January 1862.

Parliament of the United Kingdom
Preceded by Edward Litton	Member of Parliament for Coleraine; 1843–1852	Succeeded by Lord Naas
Preceded by Lord Naas	Member of Parliament for Coleraine; 1857–1862	Succeeded by Henry Bruce
