= Bellaghy =

Village in County Londonderry, Northern Ireland

Coordinates: 54.808°N 6.519°W

Bellaghy: Irish: Baile Eachaidh
- Village
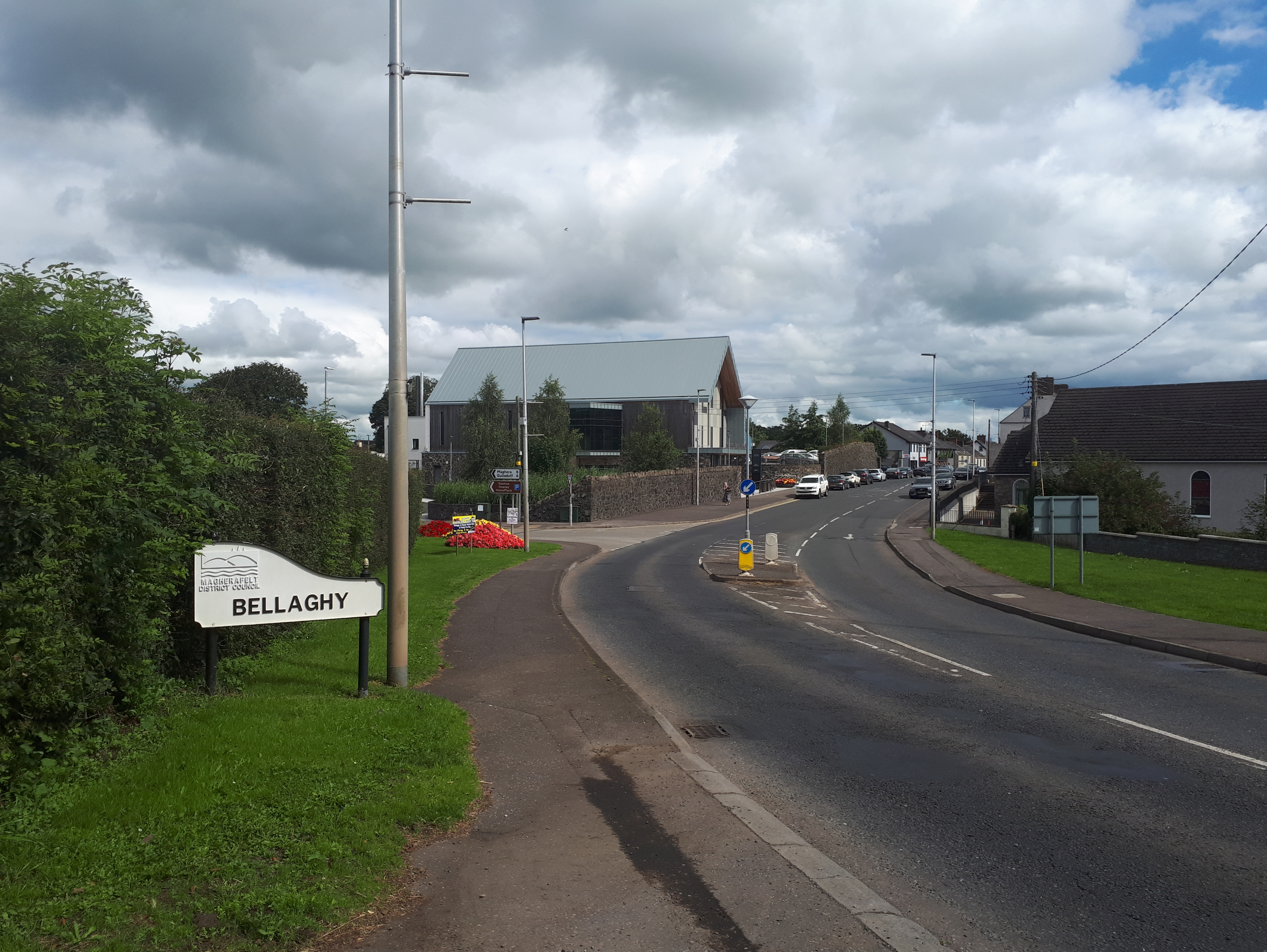
- Entering Bellaghy from Old Town Road, Seamus Heaney HomePlace in centre, August 2023

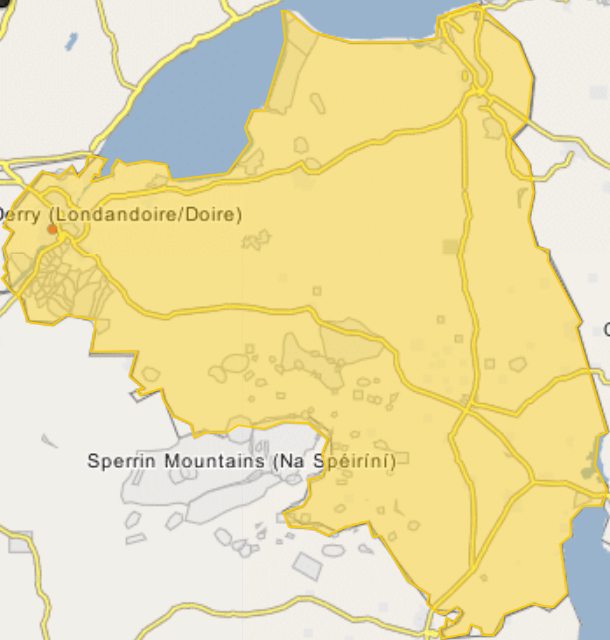
- location within County Londonderry Location within Northern Ireland
- Population: 1,063 (2001 Census)
- District: Mid Ulster
- County: County Londonderry
- Country: Northern Ireland
- Sovereign state: United Kingdom
- Post town: MAGHERAFELT
- Postcode district: BT45
- Dialling code: 028
- Police: Northern Ireland
- Fire: Northern Ireland
- Ambulance: Northern Ireland
- UK Parliament: Mid Ulster
- NI Assembly: Mid Ulster

Bellaghy (from Irish Baile Eachaidh, meaning 'Eachaidh's townland') is a village in County Londonderry, Northern Ireland. It is north west of Lough Neagh, 5 miles north east of Magherafelt. In the centre of the village (known locally as The Diamond) three main roads lead to Magherafelt, Portglenone and Toome. It had a population of 1,063 people in the 2001 Census and is within Mid-Ulster District.

Bellaghy is home to various historical landmarks, including a well-preserved 17th century fortified house, Bellaghy Bawn, which is now a museum. A Grade B+ thatched cottage is present in the Bellaghy outskirts. The village is also known as the birthplace, childhood home and resting place of poet Seamus Heaney (1939–2013), who won the Nobel Prize for Literature. There is an arts centre in the village dedicated to Heaney.

== History ==
There had long been Gaelic settlements in this area. Archaeological evidence has been found in the village of a Gaelic ringfort. The decapitated body of an Iron Age woman was discovered nearby in 2023.

In the early 17th century, Bellaghy became one of many towns planned, built and settled under the authority of the Vintners Company of London, as part of the English Plantation of Ulster. In 1622, according to a manuscript of a Captain Thomas Ash, Bellaghy consisted of a church, a castle, a corn mill and twelve houses.

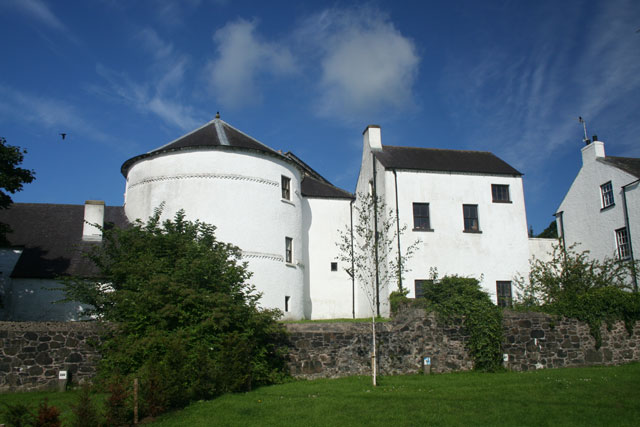
Bellaghy Bawn in 2007

During the Plantation, English colonials built a fortified house in the village. It had surrounding walls and two circular towers at opposite corners. Recent excavations have revealed that the fortified house was built on the site of a former Gaelic ringfort. During the 1641 rebellion the house was attacked by Irish rebels, but it remained intact. Many other houses in the village were burnt to the ground. Locally it was called "The Castle" and is located on Castle Street. The refurbished house was opened to the public in 1996 as Bellaghy Bawn. It is a museum featuring exhibitions on local history.

On 2 May 1922, during the Irish War of Independence, the Irish Republican Army launched an attack on Bellaghy Royal Irish Constabulary barracks - the IRA men gained access after the outer gate was mistakenly left unlocked while a 'farewell party' was being held inside for a retiring police officer. One RIC officer was killed and at least two others wounded. An IRA volunteer was also killed when he went to inspect a room and was shot 'through the woodwork' by a B-Special who had concealed himself behind a half-open door. The three other IRA volunteers subsequently withdrew, but were captured shortly afterwards.

== Notable people ==
Seamus Heaney, who became a Nobel Prize-winning poet, was born as the eldest of nine children at Mossbawn, his family's farm in Bellaghy. He later lived in Dublin but is buried in the graveyard of St Mary's Catholic Church, Bellaghy. The village has an arts centre dedicated to him, known as the Seamus Heaney HomePlace. The centre features talks, poetry readings, and performances. It has exhibits of photographs, texts, and poems to show the influence of place on his language.

Others to hail from the village include World Outdoor Bowls champion Margaret Johnston, international footballer Sarah McFadden, and Eurovision 2022 entrant for Ireland Brooke Scullion.

Two Bellaghy natives, Francis Hughes and his cousin Thomas McElwee, died participating in the 1981 Irish hunger strike during The Troubles. They were protesting at the treatment by the British and supporting political change in Northern Ireland. Other republicans from Bellaghy include former Irish National Liberation Army (INLA) leader Dominic McGlinchey.

Sean Browne, chairman of the local Bellaghy Wolfe Tones GAC, was abducted by the Loyalist Volunteer Force in May 1997 while he locking the clubgrounds after a gaelic football game and then murdered near Randalstown, County Antrim.

== Demographics ==
=== 1991 Census ===
On Census day (22 April 1991), there were 1,041 people living in Bellaghy. Of these:

- 501 (48.1%) were male and 540 (51.9%) were female.

=== 2001 Census ===
Bellaghy is classified as a Village by the Northern Ireland Statistics and Research Agency (NISRA), i.e. with population between 1,000 and 2,250 people. On Census day (29 April 2001), there were 1,063 people living in Bellaghy. Of these:

- 31.4% were aged under 16 years and 12.7% were aged 60 and over
- 49.9% of the population were male and 50.1% were female
- 86% were from a Catholic background and 14% were from a Protestant background
- 83.35% were of the Catholic faith, 13.16% were of a Protestant faith, and 15.04% were irreligious or did not state their religion.
- 4.6% of people aged 16–74 were unemployed

=== 2011 Census ===
NISRA classified Bellaghy as village (Band G) with 1,155 people living there.

=== 2021 Census ===
On Census day (21 March 2021), there were 1,251 people living in Bellaghy. Of these:

- 310 (24.78%) were aged under 16, 157 (12.55%) were aged 16–24, 236 (18.86%) were aged 17–34, 159 (12.71%) were aged 35–44, 153 (12.23%) were aged 45–54, 103 (8.23%) were aged 55–64, 133 (10.63%) were aged 65+.
- 654 were female (52.28%), while 597 (47.72%) were male.
- 808 (64.69%) indicated an Irish identity, 312 (24.98%) indicated a Northern Irish, 152 (12.17%) indicated a British identity and 32 (2.56%) indicated an 'other' identity. The respondents could select multiple identities.
- 1,115 (89.2%) were from a Catholic background, 104 (8.32%) were from a Protestant background, 5 (0.4%) were from another religious background, and 26 (2.08%) had an irreligious background.
- 1,080 (86.33%) were Catholic, 42 (3.36%) were Church of Ireland, 37 (2.96%) were Presbyterian, 11 (0.88%) were of an other Christian denomination, 4 (0.32%) were of an other religion, 62 (4.96%) were irreligious and 15 (1.2%) did not state their religion.
- 301 (24.04%) had some ability of Irish, and 68 (5.44%) had some ability of Ulster-Scots.

== See also ==
- Bellaghy GAC
