= Sir Stewart Bruce, 1st Baronet =

British politician

Sir Stewart Bruce, 1st Baronet (died 19 Mar 1841) was an Irish politician.

Bruce represented Lisburn in the Irish House of Commons between 1798 and 1800. He was subsequently genealogist of the Order of St Patrick and Gentleman Usher of Dublin Castle. On 23 December 1812 he was created a baronet, of Dublin in the Baronetage of the United Kingdom. The title became extinct on his death in 1841. His brother was the Anglican priest, Henry Bruce, who was also made a baronet.

Parliament of Ireland
Preceded by George Hatton; John Moore	Member of Parliament for Lisburn; 1798–1800; With: George Hatton	Succeeded by Westminster constituency of Lisburn
Baronetage of the United Kingdom
New creation	Baronet (of Dublin); 1812–1841	Extinct
Preceded by Hobhouse baronets	Bruce baronets of Dublin; 23 December 1812	Succeeded by Brenton baronets
