= Bruce baronets =

There have been four baronetcies created for persons with the surname Bruce, two in the Baronetage of Nova Scotia and two in the Baronetage of the United Kingdom. Two of the creations are extant as of 2023.

- Bruce baronets of Stenhouse (1628)
- Bruce baronets of Balcaskie (1668)
- Bruce baronets of Downhill (1804)
- Bruce baronets of Dublin (1812): see Sir Stewart Bruce, 1st Baronet (c.1764–1841)

== See also ==
- Earl of Elgin
- Bruce-Gardner baronets
