= Sir Henry Bruce, 1st Baronet =

Irish priest

Sir Henry Hervey Aston Bruce, 1st Baronet ( – 11 April 1822) was an Irish priest.

== Early life ==
Bruce was the son of James Bruce and Henrietta Aston. He was the brother of Sir Stewart Bruce, 1st Baronet and also of Frideswide Mussenden for whom the Mussenden Temple (near Downhill House) was built and named.

His paternal grandparents were the Rev. Patrick Bruce and Margaret Hamilton (a daughter of James Hamilton of Ladyland). His maternal grandparents were Rev. Hon. Henry Hervey-Aston (a son of the 1st Earl of Bristol and Lady Elizabeth) and Catherine Aston (a daughter of Sir Thomas Aston, 3rd Baronet and sister to Sir Thomas Aston, 4th Baronet).

In 1785, he graduated with a Bachelor of Arts from Trinity College, Dublin.

== Career ==
In 1803, he inherited Downhill House from his cousin, Frederick Hervey, 4th Earl of Bristol, and he was created Baronet, of Downhill in the Baronetage of the United Kingdom, on 29 June 1804.

== Personal life ==
On 10 November 1786, Bruce married Letitia Barnard (c. 1765–1816), a daughter of Rev. Dr. Henry Barnard and Mary Canning. Together, they were the parents of:

- Sir James Robertson Bruce, 2nd Baronet (1788–1836), who married Ellen Hesketh, daughter of Robert Bamford-Hesketh of Gwrych Castle, in 1819.
- Admiral Sir Henry William Bruce (1792–1863), who married Jane Cochrane, daughter of Adm. Hon. Sir Alexander Cochrane (a son of the 8th Earl of Dundonald), in 1822. After her death in 1830, he married Louisa Mary Minchin Dalrymple, a daughter of Col. George Dalrymple, in 1832.
- Stewart Crawford Bruce (1801–1878), who married Helen Baillie Alves, daughter of William Alves of Enham Place, Hampshire, in 1828.

Sir Henry died on 11 April 1822. He was succeeded in his title by his son, James Bruce.

Baronetage of the United Kingdom
New creation	Baronet (of Downhill); 1804–1822	Succeeded by James Bruce
