= Clifton (surname) =

Clifton is a surname.

== People ==
- Clifton (1817 cricketer), English cricketer
- Allie Clifton (born 1988), American journalist
- Arthur Clifton (1771–1869), British soldier
- Bernie Clifton (born 1936), British comedian
- Bill Clifton (1931–2026), American musician
- Brian Clifton (footballer) (1934–2020), English footballer who played for Southampton and Grimsby Town
- Chad Clifton (born 1976), offensive lineman for the Green Bay Packers football team
- Chas S. Clifton (born 1951), American academic
- Chester Victor Clifton Jr. (1913–1991), Major General in the United States Army
- Clifford Clifton (1626–1670), English landowner and politician
- Connor Clifton (born 1995), American ice hockey player
- Dan Clifton (1865–1896?), American Old West outlaw
- Donald O. Clifton (1924–2003), American psychologist
- Elmer Clifton (1890–1949), American writer and actor
- Flea Clifton (1909–1997), American baseball player
- Gervase Clifton, 1st Baron Clifton (1579–1618), of Barrington Court, Somerset
- Sir Gervase Clifton, 1st Baronet, (1587–1666), of Nottinghamshire
- Sir Gervase Clifton, 2nd Baronet, (1612–1675), of Nottinghamshire
- Harry Clifton (disambiguation)
- Helen Clifton (1948–2011), wife of the 18th General of the Salvation Army
- Herbert Clifton (1885–1947), British-born female impersonator and actor
- Jane Clifton (born 1949), Australian actor
- Jessie Clifton (1876–1959), Australian nurse
- Jim Clifton, American businessman
- Joanne Clifton (born 1983), English dancer
- John Clifton (disambiguation)
- John Talbot Clifton (1868–1928), English traveller and landowner
- Joseph C. Clifton (1905–1967), American naval officer
- Kevin Clifton (born 1982), English dancer
- Kyle Clifton (born 1962), American footballer
- Maddie Clifton (1990–1998), American murder victim
- Mark Clifton (1906–1963), American author and businessman
- Nathaniel Clifton (1922–1990), American athlete
- Pete Clifton (born 1962), head of BBC News Interactive
- Peter Clifton (1941–2018), Australian director and producer
- Phil Clifton (born 1988), British television and radio presenter
- Richard Clifton (born 1950), American judge
- Rob Clifton, American politician
- Sir Robert Clifton, 5th Baronet (1690–1762), MP for East Retford
- Sir Robert Clifton, 7th Baronet (1767–1837), High Sheriff of Nottinghamshire in 1820
- Robert Cox Clifton (1810–1861), British clergyman and canon of Manchester Cathedral
- Robert Bellamy Clifton (1836–1921), British physicist
- Robert Juckes Clifton (1826–1869), English Liberal Party politician
- Robert D. Clifton (born 1968), American politician
- Romola Clifton (born 1935), Australian painter
- Scott Clifton (born 1987), American musician and actor
- Shaw Clifton (1945–2023), 18th General of the Salvation Army
- Steve Clifton (born 1987), Australian rules football player
- Tuva'a Clifton (born 1997), Samoan canoeist
- Violet Clifton (1883–1961), English traveller
- Sir William Clifton, 3rd Baronet, (1663–1686), of Nottinghamshire

== Fictional ==
- Tony Clifton, fictional character created by Andy Kaufman
- Pat Clifton, protagonist of Postman Pat
- Leon Clifton, a fictional American detective from Czech pulp fiction

== See also ==
- Geoffrey Benedict Clifton-Brown (1899–1983), British Conservative Party politician
- Sir Geoffrey Robert Clifton-Brown (born 1953), British politician and farmer
- Richard Clifton-Dey (1930–1997), British illustrator
