= Sir Hervey Bruce, 5th Baronet =

Sir Hervey Ronald Bruce, 4th Baronet JP DL (9 December 1872 – 18 May 1924) was an English landowner.

== Early life ==
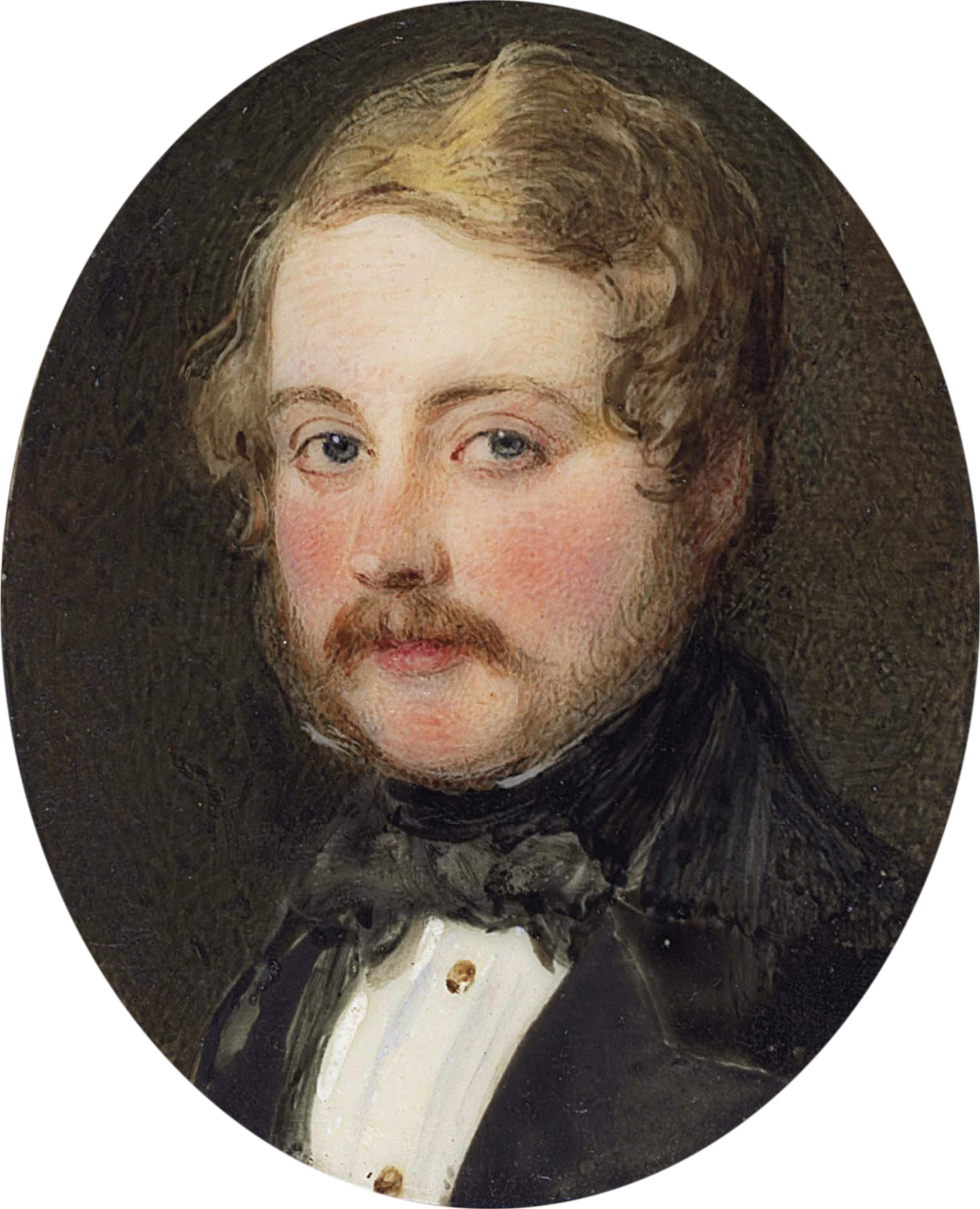
Portrait of his grandfather Sir Henry Bruce, 3rd Baronet by William Charles Ross, 1841

He was the elder of twin sons born to Ellen Maud Ricardo (d. 1924) and Sir Hervey Bruce, 4th Baronet, who served as High Sheriff of County Londonderry. Among his younger brothers were Percy Robert Bruce and diplomat Henry James Bruce CMG MVO, who married the Russian ballerina Tamara Karsavina.

His paternal grandparents were Sir Henry Bruce, 3rd Baronet, and Marianne Margaret Juckes-Clifton (a daughter of Sir Juckes Granville Juckes-Clifton, 8th Baronet). His maternal grandparents were stockbroker Matilda Mawdesley Hensley (a daughter of John Isaac Hensley of Holborn, Middlesex), and Percy Ricardo of Bramley Park, Guildford, Surrey. Among his extended family was aunt Amy Gordon-Lennox, Countess of March (wife of Charles Gordon-Lennox, 7th Duke of Richmond), and uncles Col. Horace Ricardo, and Col. F. C. Ricardo.

Like his father, Bruce was educated at Eton College.

== Career ==
He entered the British Army and became a captain in the Irish Guards before becoming a Major in the 14th Service Battalion, Royal Irish Regiment. He served in the Second Boer War from 1899 to 1902, receiving the "Queen's and the King's medals with seven clasps."

In 1896, his father succeeded his second cousin Henry Robert Clifton to the Clifton estates in Nottinghamshire, after which Clifton Hall became the family's primary residence. Upon the death of his father in 1919, he succeeded as the 6th baronet of Downhill and inherited the family seat, Downhill, County Londonderry of c. 22,000 acres. His younger brother, Percy Robert Bruce, later Clifton, inherited Clifton Hall and the Clifton estate. He served as a Justice of the Peace and Deputy Lieutenant for County Londonberry.

== Personal life ==
On 3 November 1903 he married Ruth Isabel Okeover, daughter of Haughton Charles Okeover of Okeover Hall and Hon. Eliza Anne Cavendish (a daughter of the 3rd Baron Waterpark). She died, without issue, on 27 September 1915.

On 11 July 1916, he married Margaret Florence Jackson, a daughter of Rev. Robert Jackson of Little Thurlow, Newmarket. Together, they lived at 3 Chatsworth Gardens, Southcliff, Eastbourne, and had three children, including:

- Beryl Margaret Gwladys Bruce (b. 1917)
- Sir Hervey John William Bruce, 6th Baronet (1919–1971), who married Crista Irene Valentine (née de Paravicini) Innes-Ker, daughter of Chandos de Paravicini and Chinty Helen Charlotte Lockwood; she was the former wife of Maj. David Charles Innes-Ker (a son of Lord Alastair Robert Innes-Ker and grandson of the 7th Duke of Roxburghe), in 1949.
- Ronald Cecil Juckes Bruce (b. 1921), who married Jean Murfitt, daughter of Lewis James William Murfitt, in 1960.

Sir Hervey died on 18 May 1924. He was succeeded in the baronetcy by his eldest son, Hervey. After his death, his widow married Lt.-Col. Charles Oxley Morris of the Indian Army on 3 June 1925.

Baronetage of the United Kingdom
Preceded by Hervey Juckes Lloyd Bruce	Baronet (of Downhill); 1919–1924	Succeeded by Hervey John William Bruce
