= Sir Hervey Bruce, 4th Baronet =

Sir Hervey Juckes Lloyd Bruce, 4th Baronet JP DL (5 October 1843 – 8 May 1919) was High Sheriff of County Londonderry in 1903.

== Early life ==
He was the son of Sir Henry Hervey Bruce, 3rd Baronet of Downhill, County Londonderry, and Marianne Margaret Juckes-Clifton (a daughter of Sir Juckes Granville Juckes-Clifton, 8th Baronet, of Clifton).

Bruce was educated at Eton College.

== Career ==
He entered the British Army at the age of 19, was an officer in the Coldstream Guards from 1862 until his retirement as a Lieutenant-Colonel in 1878.

In 1896, he succeeded his second cousin Henry Robert Clifton to the Clifton estates in Nottinghamshire, after which Clifton Hall became the family's primary residence. Upon the death of his father in 1907, he succeeded as the 4th baronet of Downhill. He served as a Justice of the Peace and Deputy Lieutenant.

== Personal life ==
In 1872 he married Ellen Maud Ricardo (d. 1924), a daughter of stockbroker Percy Ricardo of Bramley Park, Guildford, Surrey, and the former Matilda Mawdesley Hensley (a daughter of John Isaac Hensley of Holborn, Middlesex). Among her siblings were Amy Gordon-Lennox, Countess of March (wife of Charles Gordon-Lennox, 7th Duke of Richmond, before he inherited the dukedom), Col. Horace Ricardo, and Col. F. C. Ricardo. Together, they had four sons, including:

- Sir Hervey Ronald Bruce, 5th Baronet (1872–1924), who married Margaret Florence Jackson; he inherited Downhill.
- Percy Robert Bruce, later Clifton (1872–1944), who married Aletheia Georgina Paget, a daughter of Sir Richard Paget, 1st Baronet. After her death in 1904, he married Evelyn Mary Amelia Leith, daughter of Maj. Thomas Leith of Petmathen; he inherited Clifton Hall and the Clifton estate.
- Henry James Bruce CMG MVO (1880–1951), a diplomat who married the Russian ballerina Tamara Karsavina, a daughter of Platon Karsavin and former wife of civil servant Vasili Vasilievich Mukhin.

Sir Hervey died in Tangiers on 8 May 1919 and was succeeded in the baronetcy by his son, Hervey.

Baronetage of the United Kingdom
| Preceded by Henry Bruce | Baronet (of Downhill); 1907–1919 | Succeeded by Hervey Bruce |
