= Gervase Clifton =

Gervase Clifton may refer to:

- Sir Gervase Clifton (died 1471), English knight and landowner
- Gervase Clifton (MP) (died 1588), English Member of Parliament for Nottinghamshire (UK Parliament constituency)
- Gervase Clifton, 1st Baron Clifton (c. 1570–1618)
- Sir Gervase Clifton, 1st Baronet (1587–1666), "Sir Gervase with seven wives"
- Sir Gervase Clifton, 2nd Baronet (1612–1675)
- Sir Gervase Clifton, 4th Baronet (1666–1731), briefly imprisoned as a Jacobite sympathiser in 1715
- Sir Gervase Clifton, 6th Baronet (1744–1815), High Sheriff of Nottinghamshire in 1767

== See also ==
- Clifton (surname)
