= Robert Clifton =

Robert Clifton may refer to:

- Sir Robert Clifton, 5th Baronet (1690–1762), MP for East Retford
- Sir Robert Clifton, 7th Baronet (1767–1837), High Sheriff of Nottinghamshire in 1820
- Robert Cox Clifton (1810–1861), British clergyman and canon of Manchester Cathedral
- Robert Bellamy Clifton (1836–1921), British physicist
- Robert Juckes Clifton (1826–1869), English Liberal Party politician
- Robert D. Clifton (born 1968), American politician
- Sumangalo (Robert Stuart Clifton, 1903–1963), American Buddhist monk
- PC Robert Clifton, character in the British television series HolbyBlue
