= John Clifton =

John Clifton may refer to:

- John Clifton (MP for Stafford) (died 1400), MP for Stafford (UK Parliament constituency)
- John Clifton (MP for Nottinghamshire) (died 1403), MP for Nottinghamshire (UK Parliament constituency)
- John Clifton (master founder), master founder at the Whitechapel Bell Foundry, London, 1632–1640
- John C. Clifton (1781–1841), English musical composer
- John Clifton (medical physicist) (born 1930)
- John Clifton (tennis)
- John Talbot Clifton, English landowner and traveller
- John Talbot Clifton (MP), English landowner and Member of Parliament
