= Clifford Clifton =

English landowner and politician

Sir Clifford Clifton (1626 - June 1670) was an English landowner and politician who sat in the House of Commons from 1659.

== Early life ==
Clifford was baptised on 22 June 1626. He was the son of Sir Gervase Clifton, 1st Baronet of Clifton-on Trent, Nottinghamshire and, his second wife, Lady Frances Clifford, a daughter of Francis Clifford, 4th Earl of Cumberland. He was admitted at Gray's Inn in 1647.

== Career ==
In 1659, he was elected Member of Parliament for East Retford in the Third Protectorate Parliament. He was commissioner for militia for Nottinghamshire in March 1660 and became JP for Nottinghamshire in July 1660, remaining in the post until his death. In 1661 he was elected MP for East Retford again for the Cavalier Parliament. He was captain in the horse volunteers in 1661 and became Deputy Lieutenant for Nottinghamshire and commissioner for assessment for Nottinghamshire from 1661 until his death. He was knighted on 27 December 1661. From 1663 ro 1664 he was commissioner for assessment for Nottingham and from 1663 to his death he was commissioner for assessment for Middlesex, He succeeded to the Clifton estate on the death of his father in 1666. In 1669 he became JP for the liberties of Southwell and Scrooby. He was elected a Fellow of the Royal Society in 1667.

== Personal life ==
Clifton married Frances Finch on 4 July 1650. She was a daughter of Hon. Sir Heneage Finch former Speaker of the House of Commons, of Kensington, and a granddaughter of Elizabeth Finch, 1st Countess of Winchilsea and Sir Moyle Finch, 1st Baronet. They were the parents of three sons and four daughters, with one son and two daughters living to maturity while the others died in infancy. The surviving children were:

- Sir William Clifton, 3rd Baronet (1663–1686), who inherited the baronetcy from his uncle Sir Gervase Clifton, 2nd Baronet (an elder half brother of Sir Clifford).
- Katherine Clifton, who married Sir John Parsons, 2nd Baronet Parsons of Langley, in c. 1686.
- Arabella Clifton (d. 1720), who married m 1685 Admiral Sir Francis Wheeler.

He died at the age of about 43 and was buried at Clifton on 22 June 1670.

Parliament of England
Preceded by Not represented in Second Protectorate Parliament	Member of Parliament for East Retford; 1659; With: William Cartwright	Succeeded by Edward Neville
