= Sir William Clifton, 3rd Baronet =

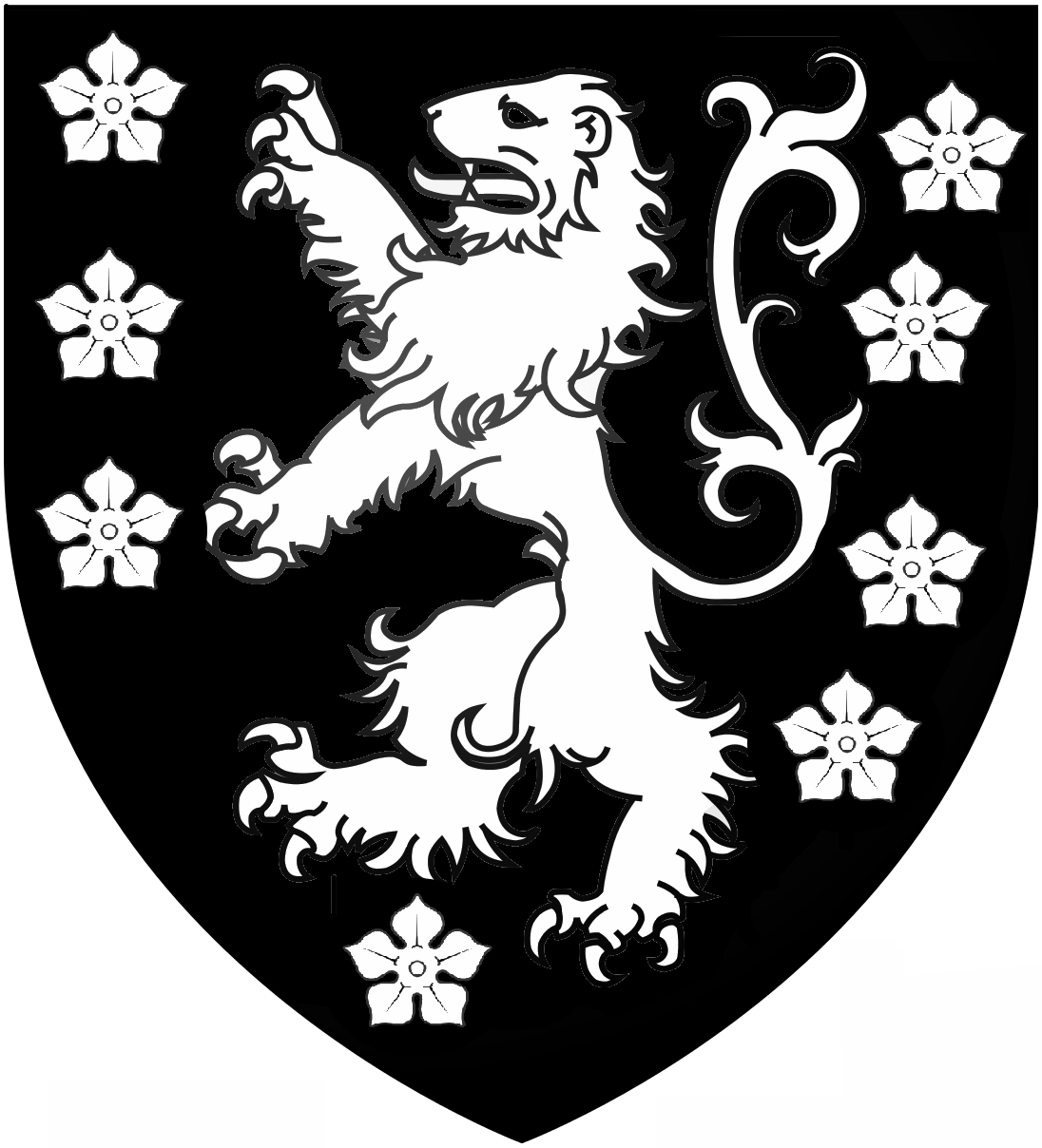
Arms of Clifton of Clifton, Nottinghamshire (Clifton Baronets): Sable semée of cinquefoils and a lion rampant argent

Sir William Clifton, JP (1663 – 1686 in France) was 3rd Baronet Clifton of Clifton, Nottinghamshire, and Deputy Lieutenant of Nottinghamshire from 1683 to 1686. In 1685, he founded a regiment which later became the 15th Regiment of Foot and subsequently the East Yorkshire Regiment.

== Family ==
William was the third, but eldest surviving son of Sir Clifford Clifton and Frances Finch, daughter of Sir Heneage Finch former Speaker of the House of Commons. He was christened in St Mary Abbots, Kensington on 7 April 1663.

His paternal grandfather was Sir Gervase Clifton, 1st Baronet and paternal grandmother was Lady Frances Clifford, daughter of Francis Clifford, 4th Earl of Cumberland

He succeeded his father in ownership of the Clifton estates in 1670, and succeeded his cousin Sir Gervase Clifton, 2nd Baronet, to the baronetcy in 1676. He was educated at Trinity College, Cambridge.

Sir William Clifton was Deputy Lieutenant for Nottinghamshire from 1683 until his death in 1686, and was also a justice of the peace from 1685 to 1686, and M.P. for Nottinghamshire, 1685–1686. On the outbreak of the Monmouth Rebellion in 1685, Sir William raised his own regiment, which later became the 15th Regiment of Foot.

He died in France at the age of 23. He was unmarried, and was succeeded by his cousin Sir Gervase Clifton, 4th Baronet.

Baronetage of England
| Preceded by Sir Gervase Clifton | Baronet (of Clifton, Nottinghamshire); 1676–1686 | Succeeded by Sir Gervase Clifton |
Military offices
| New regiment | Colonel of Sir William Clifton's Regiment of Foot; 1685–1686 | Succeeded by Arthur Herbert, 1st Earl of Torrington |
