= Listed buildings in Nottingham (Clifton South ward) =

Clifton South is a former electoral ward in the city of Nottingham, England. The ward contained 19 listed buildings that are recorded in the National Heritage List for England. Of these, two are listed at Grade I, the highest of the three grades, one is at Grade II*, the middle grade, and the others are at Grade II, the lowest grade. The ward contained the village of Clifton and the surrounding area. All the listed buildings are in the village and consist of a former country house and associated structures, a church and the churchyard walls, smaller houses and associated structures, a group of almshouses and associated buildings, and a dovecote.

== Key ==
Grade	Criteria
I	Buildings of exceptional interest, sometimes considered to be internationally important
II*	Particularly important buildings of more than special interest
II	Buildings of national importance and special interest

== Buildings ==
Name and location	Photograph	Date	Notes	Grade
St Mary's Church; 52.90807°N 1.19686°W		c. 1190	The church has been much altered, extended and restored through the centuries. It is built in stone with roofs of lead and slate, and consists of a nave with a clerestory, north and south aisles, a north porch, north and south transepts, a chancel and a vestry, and a tower at the crossing. The tower is square, without buttresses, and with three stages, chamfered string courses, and an embattled parapet. In the middle stage is an opening with a pointed arch on each side, clock faces on the north and west sides, and in the top stage are paired two-light bell openings.	I
56 Village Road; 52.90969°N 1.19157°W		1319	The house originated as a timber-framed open hall farmhouse, and it was later altered, extended and encased in brick. It has a thatched roof, two storeys, two bays, and a cross-wing on the right with a floor band and a coped gable. In the centre is a doorway, most of the windows are horizontally-sliding sashes, there is a casement window in the gable end, and an eyebrow dormer. In the interior, most of the timber framing has been retained, including base crucks.	II*
29 Village Road; 52.90945°N 1.19146°W		c. 1500	A house later altered and extended and divided into two cottages, it has a timber-framed core, mainly encased in brick, and a thatched roof. There are two storeys and two bays, and a rear extension with a single bay and a tile roof. On the front are two doorways, one with a sloping hood on brackets, two casement windows in the ground floor, two horizontally-sliding sash window in the upper floor, and a partial floor band.	II
Clifton Hall; 52.90823°N 1.19805°W		Late 16th century	A country house, later altered and used for other purposes. It is in brick and stone with hipped stone slate roofs, the main blocks on a plinth, with a floor band and a pierced balustrade. There are three storeys and a C-shaped plan with fronts of 15 and five bays. Most of the windows are sashes with projecting stone surrounds. The middle five bays of the entrance front are recessed, and contain a colonnade of paired Tuscan columns and round-headed doorways. On the west front is a three-storey bow window, and at the rear is a two-storey stair projection, with quoins and a parapet.	I
George Wells Almshouses; 52.90808°N 1.18935°W	—	1709	The almshouses are in painted rendered brick with tile roofs. The central bay has two storeys, the flanking wings have a single storey, and there are eleven bays. In the centre is a projecting wide gable with two bands, a flat-roofed porch and a doorway with sidelights, and between the floors is an inscribed slate datestone. The windows are casements.	II
Garden pavilion northeast of George Wells Almshouses; 52.90822°N 1.18922°W	—	c. 1709	The pavilion is in red brick with rebated eaves and a hipped patterned tile roof. There is a single storey and a square plan. On the south side, steps lead to a door with a wooden lintel, on the west side is a small door, and there are two fixed lights.	II
Garden pavilion southeast of George Wells Almshouses; 52.90793°N 1.18933°W	—	c. 1709	The pavilion is in red brick with rebated eaves and a hipped plain tile roof. There is a single storey and a square plan. On the north side, steps lead to a door with a wooden lintel, on the west side is a small door, and there are two fixed lights.	II
Garden shed, George Wells Almshouses; 52.90815°N 1.18876°W	—	c. 1709	The garden shed to the northeast of the almshouses is in red brick with a pyramidal blue tile roof. There is a single storey and a square plan, and on the south side is a door.	II
Dovecote; 52.90827°N 1.18784°W		Early 18th century	The dovecote, which stands in an isolated position on the village green, is in red brick, with a floor band, and a shingle roof with rendered coped gables and kneelers. On the north side is a small door, there are flight holes in both gables, and on the roof are two metal glovers with pyramidal roofs.	II
Ice house, Clifton Hall; 52.90898°N 1.19778°W		Mid 18th century	The ice house is in brick and covered in earth, making a mound about 6 metres (20 ft) across. There is a round-arched entrance to the tunnel, with buttresses, a rendered passage, and a 20th-century steel door.	II
Remains of stairway, Clifton Hall; 52.90786°N 1.19891°W	—	18th century	Formerly a double-curved stairway in the garden of the hall, the remains consist of an undercroft with fronts of three and two bays, with rendered brick elliptical vaults and small side rooms.	II
Yew Tree Grange, outbuildings and walls 52.90809°N 1.19415°W	—	Mid 18th century	The house is in red brick on a plinth, with stone dressings, deep eaves and slate roofs. There are two storeys, and an L-shaped plan, with a front range of six bays and a rear wing. In the centre is a portico with a hipped roof flanked by square bay windows with hipped roofs, and to the right are two similar bay windows. The other windows are sashes, and in the right return is a French window. In the left return is a doorway with a fanlight, and a gable with a bargeboard. The outbuilding has a single cell, it contains two doors and two windows with pointed arches and Gothic tracery, and is linked by walls to the main building.	II
Former stable block, Clifton Hall; 52.90807°N 1.19607°W		Late 18th century	The stable block, which has been converted into cottages, is in red brick, the wings rendered, on a plinth, with an eaves cornice, a blocking course, and slate roofs. The central block has two storeys, three bays, an impost band and a sill band. The middle bay projects under a pediment with a finial and a weathervane, and contains an elliptical-headed carriage entrance. The wings have a single storey, and most of the openings, which include doorways, stable doors, and sash windows, have round-arched heads.	II
Churchyard walls and gateways, St Mary's Church; 52.90811°N 1.19744°W	—	Late 18th century	The gateway to the northeast of the church consists of a round-arched opening under a shaped gable with clustered columns, containing a wrought iron gate. This is flanked by screen walls with ramped coping and rusticated end piers. Elsewhere, there are brick walls with shaped and flat coping, and at the southeast corner is a pair of square brick gate piers with pyramidal caps and wrought iron gates. To the south is a rendered brick wall with stepped moulded brick coping.	II
Coade Stone Lions, Clifton Hall; 52.90782°N 1.19785°W	—	Early 19th century	The two statues of sleeping lions are in Coade stone, and form the balustrade walls to a rebuilt garden stairway.	II
Old Rectory; 52.90883°N 1.18955°W		Early 19th century	The former rectory, later enlarged and used for other purposes, is stuccoed, on a plinth, with an eaves band and hipped slate roofs. There are two storeys and fronts of four and seven bays. On the entrance front is a flat-roofed porch and a doorway with a moulded surround and pilasters. Most of the windows are sashes, and on the garden front is a canted projecting bay.	II
Wall, railings and gate piers, Old Rectory; 52.90879°N 1.18930°W	—	Early 19th century	The boundary wall is in brick, partly stuccoed, with stone slab coping. It contains a blocked gateway with square brick piers, a gateway with wooden gates flanked by gate piers with cornice caps, and a round-arched doorway. The length to the south has cast iron coping and wrought iron railing.	II
Privy, Yew Tree Grange; 52.90807°N 1.19458°W	—	Early 19th century	The privy, later used for other purposes, is in red brick with a hipped tile roof. It consists of a single cell, with a door and a four-light window on the east side, and on the south side is a window with a pointed arch and Gothic tracery.	II
Gateways and railings, Yew Tree Grange; 52.90833°N 1.19443°W	—	c. 1870	The railings are in wrought iron, and they end is a small gateway at the east. Opposite the main entrance is a wrought iron gate with octagonal cast iron piers.	II
