= Juckes Granville Juckes-Clifton =

British noble (1769–1852)

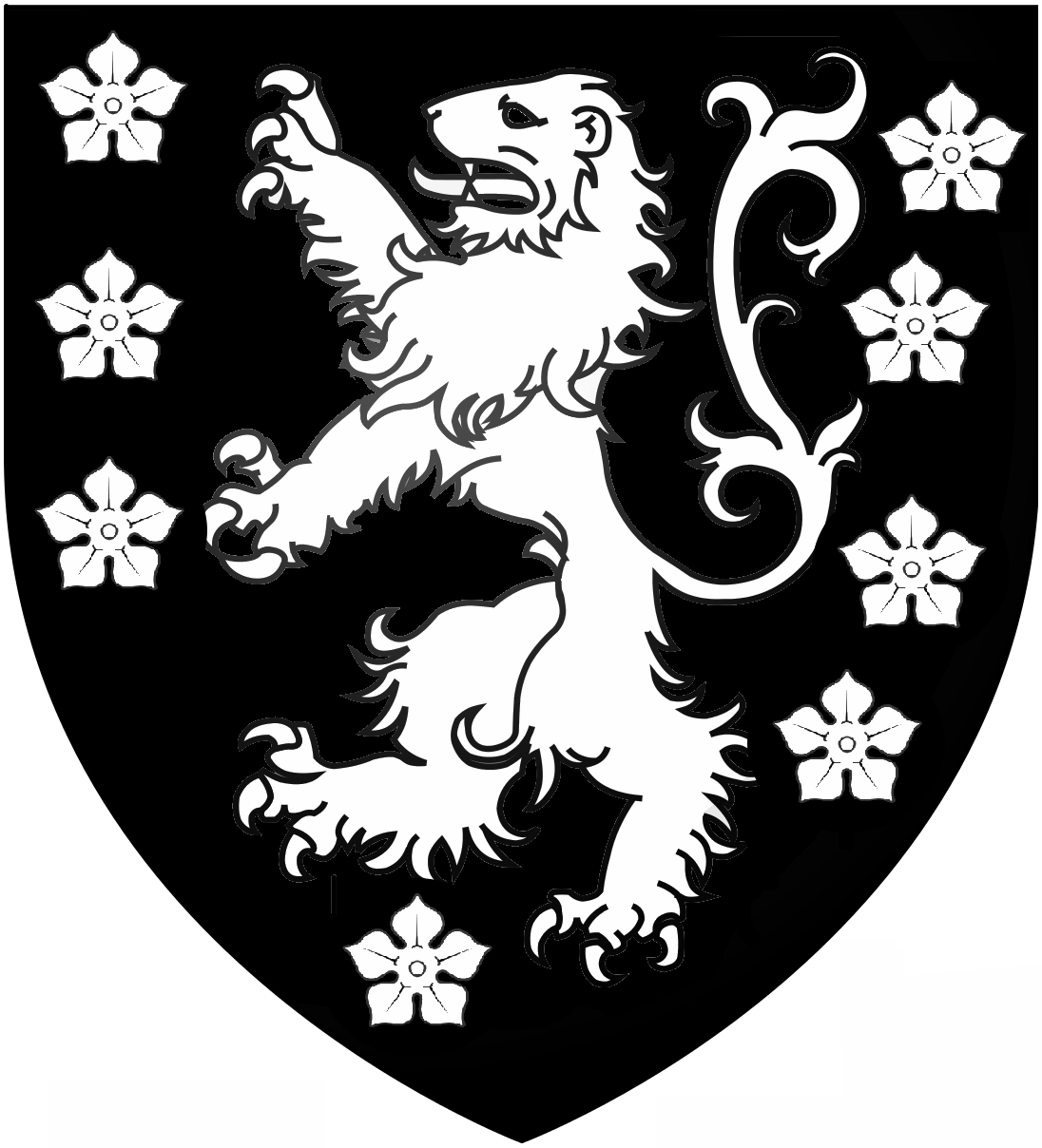
Arms of Clifton of Clifton, Nottinghamshire (Clifton Baronets): Sable semée of cinquefoils and a lion rampant argent

Sir Juckes Granville Juckes-Clifton, 8th Baronet (1769–1852) was 8th Baronet Clifton of Clifton, Nottinghamshire. and High Sheriff of Nottinghamshire in 1820.

== Early life ==
He was the second son of Sir Gervase Clifton, 6th Baronet, and wife Frances. He was educated at Rugby School.

== Career ==
In 1790 he inherited the estate of his great-uncle the Rev. Juckes Egerton, of Trelydon, Montgomeryshire, and assumed by Royal Licence the sole surname of Juckes.

He succeeded his brother Sir Robert Clifton, 7th Baronet as 8th Baronet in 1837, and consequently took the additional surname of Clifton by Royal Licence. He courted local controversy when he attempted to close off public access to the Clifton Grove walk on his estate and after a public outcry, this was abandoned.

He served as High Sheriff of Nottinghamshire in 1840.

Sir Juckes restored St. Mary's Church, Clifton at his own expense in 1852.

== Personal life ==
In 1794, he married Margaret de Lancy, daughter of James de Lancy of Bath. They had no children.

After her death, he married again in 1821, to Marianne Swinfen (d 1860), daughter of John Swinfen of Swinfen, Staffordshire. The children from this marriage were:

- Sir Robert Juckes Clifton, later 9th Baronet
- Marianne Margaret Clifton (d. 1891), married in 1842 the Rt Hon. Sir Henry Hervey Bruce, 3rd Baronet (d. 1907), of Downhill, Co. Londonderry

Sir Juckes died in 1852 and was succeeded in the baronetcy by his only son, Robert.

Baronetage of England
Preceded by Robert Clifton	Baronet (of Clifton, Nottinghamshire); 1837–1852	Succeeded by Robert Juckes Clifton
