= Clarke-Travers baronets =

Extinct baronetcy in the Baronetage of the United Kingdom

The Clarke, later Clarke-Travers later, Clarke Baronetcy, of Crosses Green in the County of Cork, was a title in the Baronetage of the United Kingdom. It was created on 28 June 1804 for William Clarke. The second Baronet assumed the additional surname of Travers in 1853. The 3rd baronet was succeeded by his cousin Edward Henry St Lawrence Clarke, the son of Rev. John William Clarke, sixth and youngest son of the 1st baronet.

Escutcheon of Clarke-Travers baronets of Crosses Green

== Clarke, later Clarke-Travers, later Clarke baronets, of Crosses Green (1804) ==
- Sir William Clarke, 1st Baronet (1762–1808)
- Sir William Henry St Laurence Clarke-Travers, 2nd Baronet (1801–1877)
- Sir Guy Francis Travers Clarke-Travers, 3rd Baronet (1842–1905)
- Sir Edward Henry St Lawrence Clarke, CMG, DSO, 4th Baronet (1857–1926)

== See also ==
- Clarke baronets

Baronetage of the United Kingdom
Preceded by Rae baronets	Clarke-Travers baronets of Crosses Green; 28 June 1804	Succeeded by Bruce baronets
