= Rae baronets =

Extinct baronetcy in the Baronetage of the United Kingdom

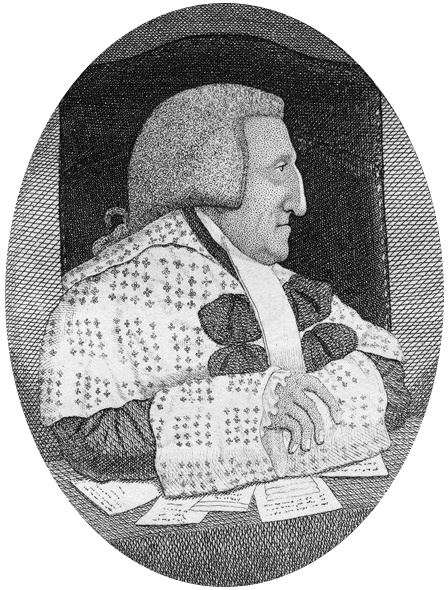
Lord Eskgrove

The Rae Baronetcy, of Eskgrove in the County of Midlothian, was a title in the Baronetage of the United Kingdom. It was created on 27 June 1804 for the Scottish judge David Rae, Lord Eskgrove. The third Baronet was Lord Advocate between 1819 and 1830 and 1834 and 1835. The title became extinct on his death in 1842.

== Rae baronets, of Esk Grove (1804) ==
- Sir David Rae, 1st Baronet (c. 1724–1804)
- Sir David Rae, 2nd Baronet (died 1815)
- Sir William Rae, 3rd Baronet (1769–1842)

Baronetage of the United Kingdom
Preceded by Lethbridge baronets	Rae baronets of Esk Grove; 27 June 1804	Succeeded by Clarke baronets
