= Harry Clifton =

Harry Clifton may refer to:

- Harry Clifton (poet) (born 1952), Irish poet
- Harry Clifton (actor), American silent film actor
- Harry Clifton (footballer, born 1914) (1914–1998), English footballer
- Harry Clifton (footballer, born 1998), Welsh footballer for Doncaster Rovers
- Harry Clifton (producer) (1907–1979), English aristocrat and film producer
- Harry Clifton (singer) (1832–1872), English music hall singer and songwriter

== See also ==
- Henry Robert Clifton (1832–1896), High Sheriff of Nottinghamshire
- Harold Clifton, main character in Clifton (comics)
- Curley Byrd (Harry Clifton Byrd, 1889–1970), American university administrator, athlete and coach
