= Bruce baronets of Downhill (1804) =

Coat of Arms of Bruce, of Downhill

The Bruce, later Bruce-Clifton Baronetcy, of Downhill in the County of Londonderry, was created in the Baronetage of the United Kingdom on 29 June 1804 for Reverend Henry Bruce. He was a descendant of Patrick Bruce, younger brother of the first Baronet of the 1628 creation, and the brother of Sir Stewart Bruce, 1st Baronet, of Dublin (see below). The third Baronet was a Conservative politician. The fourth Baronet was High Sheriff of County Londonderry in 1903. The seventh Baronet assumed the additional surname of Clifton in 1997.

== Bruce, later Bruce-Clifton baronets, of Downhill (1804) ==
- Sir Henry Hervey Aston Bruce, 1st Baronet (died 1822)
- Sir James Robertson Bruce, 2nd Baronet (1788–1836)
- Sir Henry Hervey Bruce, 3rd Baronet (1820–1907)
- Sir Hervey Juckes Lloyd Bruce, 4th Baronet (1843–1919)
- Sir Hervey Ronald Bruce, 5th Baronet (1872–1924)
- Sir Hervey John William Bruce, 6th Baronet (1919–1971)
- Sir Hervey James Hugh Bruce-Clifton, 7th Baronet (1952–2010)
- Sir Hervey Hamish Peter Bruce-Clifton, 8th Baronet (b. 1986)

The heir presumptive is the present holder's half-brother Louis William Sinclair Bruce-Clifton (b. 1993).

== Extended family ==
Sir Henry William Bruce (1792–1863), younger son of the first Baronet, was an admiral in the Royal Navy. His son by his second wife, James Minchin Bruce (1833–1901), was a rear-admiral in the Royal Navy.

== Notes ==
Baronetage of the United Kingdom
Preceded by Clarke-Travers baronets	Bruce baronets of Downhill; 29 June 1804	Succeeded by Lees baronets
