= Henry James Bruce =

British diplomat and author (1880–1951)

Henry James Bruce CMG MVO (1 November 1880 – 10 September 1951) was a British diplomat and author. Nearing the end of a diplomatic career in the Austrian, German and Russian Empires, he married the ballerina Tamara Karsavina. In the 1930s, he was an adviser to the National Bank of Hungary, and in retirement wrote books about his life.

== Early life ==
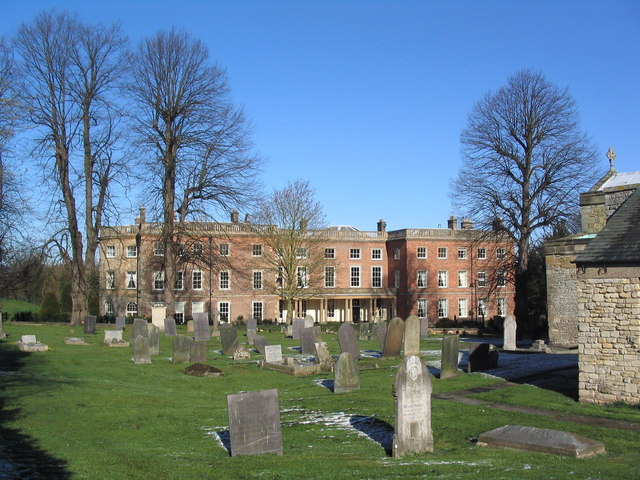
Clifton Hall

A younger son of Sir Hervey Juckes Lloyd Bruce, 4th Baronet (1843–1919), by his marriage to Ellen Maud Ricardo OBE, Bruce was one of four sons. His father, who was an officer of the Coldstream Guards, had country houses at Clifton Hall, near Nottingham, and Downhill, County Londonderry, and owned altogether some 22,000 acres. Like his father and brothers, Bruce was educated at Eton.

Bruce's parents lived mainly in London and at Downhill until in 1896 his father succeeded a cousin, Henry Robert Clifton, to the Clifton estates in Nottinghamshire. Bruce's youth at Clifton is recalled in his book Silken Dalliance (1946). He was a cousin of Kathleen Scott, sculptor and widow of Robert Falcon Scott.

== Career ==
In 1904 Bruce entered the Foreign Office, and in 1905 was sent to Vienna as a junior diplomat in the British mission to the Austrian Empire. In 1906 he was appointed Third Secretary there. In 1908 he transferred to the British Embassy in Berlin, where he was promoted a Second Secretary in May 1911. In 1913 he went to Saint Petersburg, soon to be renamed Petrograd, where he became First Secretary in 1918.

Bruce retired from the British diplomatic service in 1920 and the next year became Secretary General of the British delegation to the Interallied Commission for Bulgaria, going on to serve as British Delegate from 1924 to 1926. He was an adviser to the National Bank of Hungary from 1931 to 1939, when with the outbreak of the Second World War he returned to the United Kingdom.

=== Writing career ===
In retirement, Bruce began to write books. One reviewer wrote of his Silken Dalliance (1946) "It is more than silken dalliance that "in the wardrobe lies"; a whole era of English history had the door shut on it in 1914, and nothing quite like it will ever be seen again. It is this era that Mr Bruce set out to capture for us."

In 1949 Bruce became treasurer of the Peabody Donation Fund. He was a member of the St James's Club and the Marylebone Cricket Club.

== Personal life ==
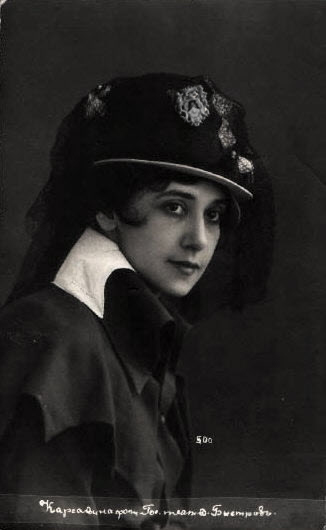
Bruce's wife, Tamara Karsavina, c. 1910

In 1918, Bruce married the Russian prima ballerina Tamara Karsavina (1885–1978). Together, they were the parents of one child:

- Nikita Bruce (1916-2002), the son of Karsavina's first husband, Vasili Mukhin. He first married Kay Bannerman, an actress, and later Dorothy Mary Norah Mostyn.

Bruce died on 10 September 1951.

=== Descendants ===
Through his son's second marriage, he was a grandfather of Caroline Mary Tamara Bruce (born 1958), and Nicholas William Henry Bruce (born 1960).

== Publications ==
- Silken Dalliance (Constable, 1946; second edition 1947)
- Thirty Dozen Moons (1949)

== Honours ==
- Member of the Royal Victorian Order, 1907
- Companion of the Order of St Michael and St George, 1917
