= John C. Clifton =

English composer

John Charles Clifton (7 November 1781, London – 18 November 1841, Hammersmith) was an English composer.

== Life ==
John Clifton was born in London in 1781. His father had expected him to become a merchant, but Clifton's early talent for music was so clear that he was put under the care of a relation, the singer Richard Bellamy, with whom he studied music for five years. He then became the pupil of Charles Wesley, and eventually decided to follow music as a profession, giving up an appointment in the Stationery Office, which he held for about two years.

Clifton's first professional engagement was at Bath, where he conducted the Harmonic Society. In 1802 he went to Dublin, and in 1815 produced a musical piece called Edwin there, which is said to have been successful. He also gained some credit by organising (together with Sir John Andrew Stevenson) a concert on a very large scale in aid of the sufferers from the Irish famine. About 1816 he invented an instrument for helping singing by sight. He called it the "Eidomusicon," though it does not seem to have been patented. About the same time he finished a work on the theory of harmony. He came to London in 1818 to try to publish his invention, but was unsuccessful.

Clifton next adopted the Logierian system of musical instruction and for some years was a well-known teacher in London. He married the proprietress of a ladies' school at Hammersmith, where the last years of his life were spent. About 1838 he became possessed with the idea that he was enormously wealthy, and the mania grew to such an extent that he needed to be put under restraint. He died at Teresa House, Hammersmith, on 18 November 1841. His compositions chiefly consisted of songs and glees.
