= Henry Robert Clifton =

Henry Robert Clifton (born Markham; 30 December 1832 – 8 January 1896) was an English landowner who was High Sheriff of Nottinghamshire in 1875.

== Early life ==
Henry was born at Clifton, Nottingham, where his father rebuilt the Rectory, in 1832. He was the only son of the Rev. Henry Spencer Markham (1805-1844), Rector of St. Mary's Church, Clifton and Prebendary of York, and his wife Sophia Charlotte Kaye (a daughter of Sir John Lister Kaye, 1st Baronet).

His grandparents were Frances Clifton, daughter of Sir Gervase Clifton, 6th Baronet, and her husband the Venerable Robert Markham, Archdeacon of York.

== Career ==
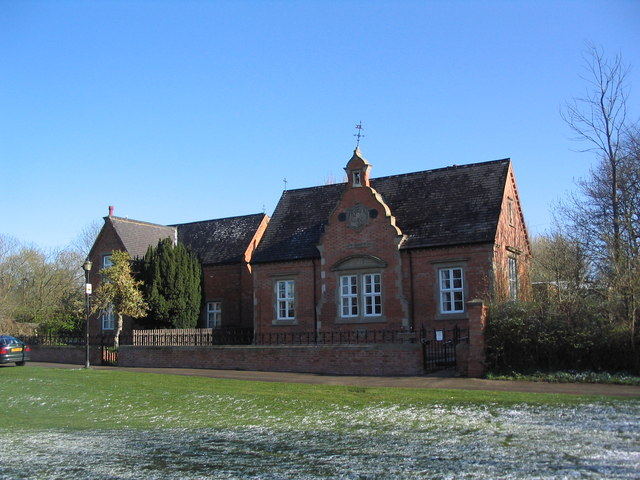
School in Clifton, Nottingham built by Henry Robert Clifton in 1871

Henry was educated at Harrow School and Christ Church, Oxford. He succeeded his cousin, Sir Robert Juckes Clifton, 9th Baronet, to the Clifton estate in Nottinghamshire in 1869. In the same year he assumed the surname and arms of Clifton in place of Markham by Royal Licence.

He served as a Justice of the Peace for Nottinghamshire, and was High Sheriff of Nottinghamshire in 1875. He made improvements to the house and grounds at Clifton Hall, Nottingham. In 1871 he provided a new school for the village at Clifton, Nottingham.

== Personal life ==
He married Elizabeth, daughter of the Rev. William MacBean, Rector of St Peter Tavy, Devon, in 1860. They had no children.

At his death, the Clifton estates passed to his second cousin, Sir Hervey Juckes Lloyd Bruce, 4th Baronet.
