= Sir Robert Clifton, 7th Baronet =

British noble (1767–1837)

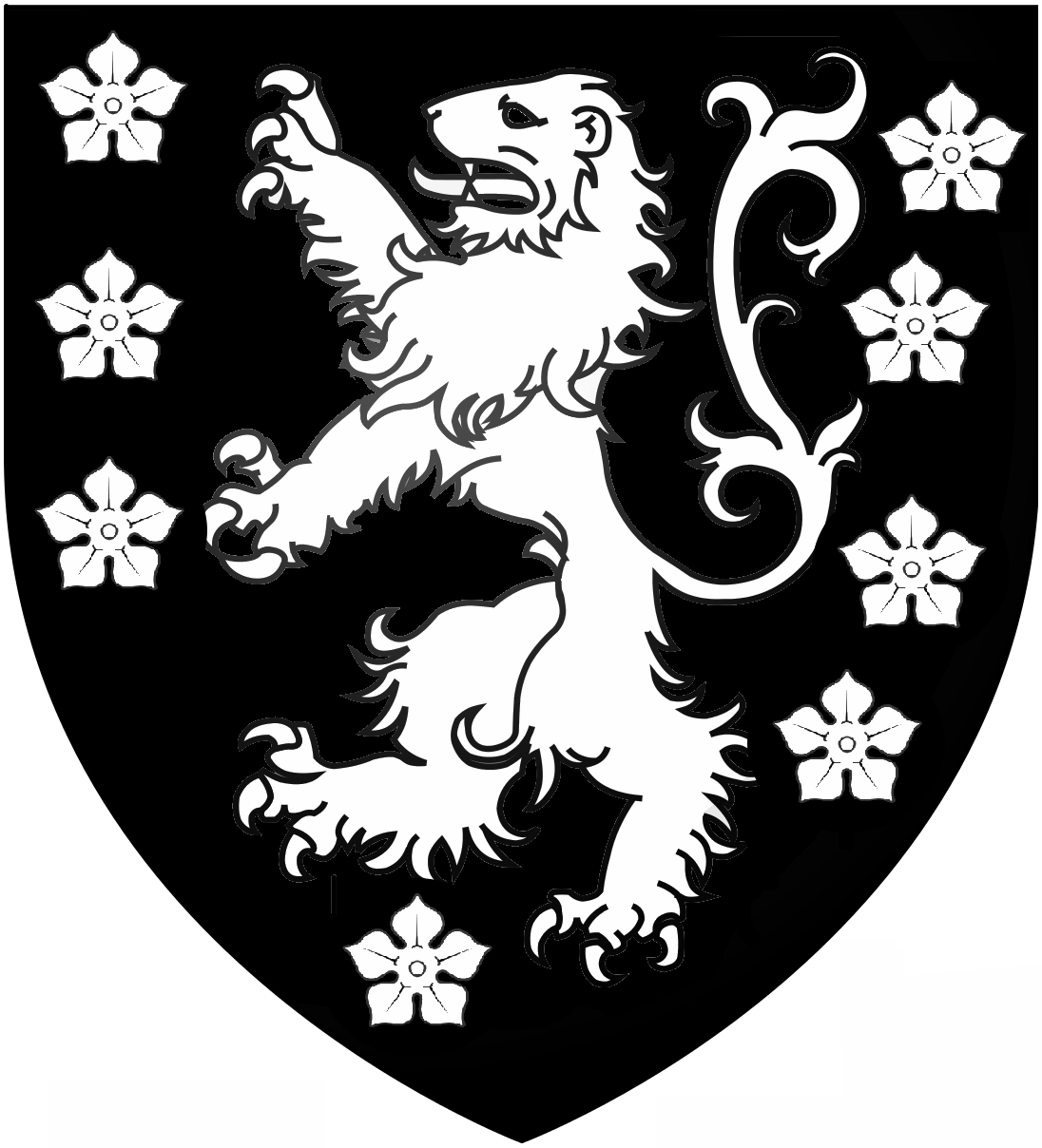
Arms of Clifton of Clifton, Nottinghamshire (Clifton Baronets): Sable semée of cinquefoils and a lion rampant argent

Sir Robert Clifton (1767–1837) was 7th Baronet Clifton of Clifton, Nottinghamshire and High Sheriff of Nottinghamshire in 1820.

== Family ==
He was the eldest son of Sir Gervase Clifton, 6th Baronet, and wife Frances. He succeeded his father in 1815.

Educated at Rugby School, he served as High Sheriff of Nottinghamshire in 1820.

He did not marry and was succeeded by his brother Juckes Granville Juckes-Clifton as 8th Baronet.

Baronetage of England
Preceded by Gervase Clifton	Baronet (of Clifton, Nottinghamshire); 1815–1837	Succeeded by Juckes Granville Juckes-Clifton
