= John Clifton (medical physicist) =

British medical physicist (1930–2023)

John Clifton FInstP, FIPEM
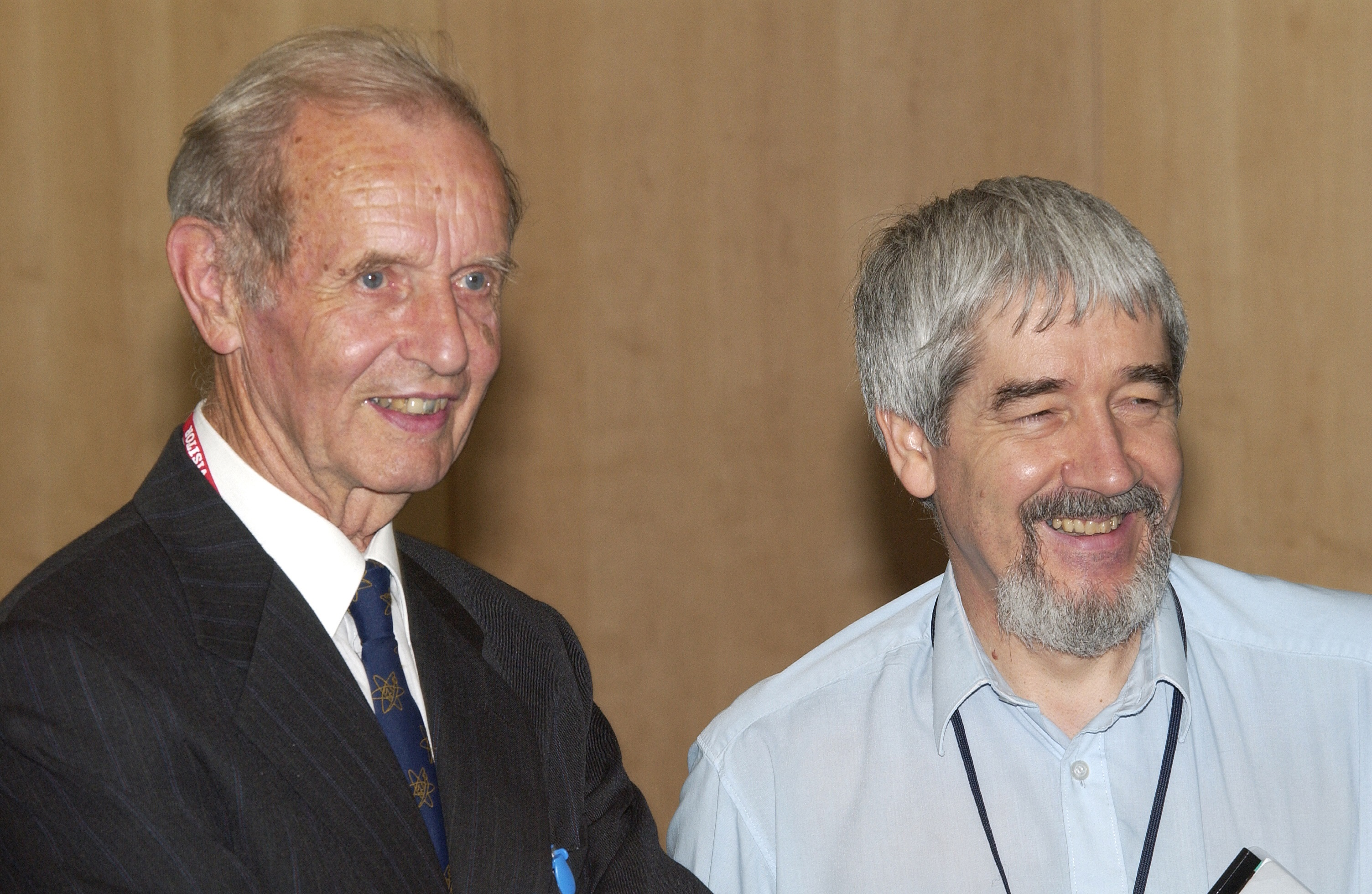
- Clifton (left) with David Delpy
- Born: John Stephen Clifton; April 1930
- Died: 20 January 2023 (aged 92)
- Education: University of Southampton
- Occupation: Medical physicist
- Employers: Royal South Hants Hospital; University College Hospital Medical School; University College London; University of London

John Stephen Clifton FInstP, FIPEM (April 1930 – 20 January 2023) was a British medical physicist.

== Early life and education ==
Clifton studied at the University of Southampton, graduating in 1955 and then worked at the Royal South Hants Hospital.

== Career ==
In 1957 he obtained a position at University College Hospital Medical School becoming head of the medical physics department in 1962. The school merged with University College London and he became Professor of Medical Physics. In 1990, he was appointed Joel Professor of Physics Applied to Medicine at the University of London in 1990, becoming Emeritus upon retirement.

Clifton served as president of the Hospital Physicists' Association (now the Institute of Physics and Engineering in Medicine) from 1976 to 1978, and as honorary editor of "Physics in Medicine and Biology" from 1979 to 1983. He was the founding President of the European Federation of Organisations for Medical Physics (EFOMP) from 1980 to 1984, having proposed its establishment in 1978. He was a Fellow of the Institute of Physics (FInstP), and a Fellow of the Institute of Physics and Engineering in Medicine (FIPEM).

== Death ==
Clifton died on 20 January 2023, at the age of 92.

== Awards and recognition ==
The John Clifton Prize, initiated in 2011, is awarded by University College London "for the most outstanding performance by a non-final-year undergraduate", in his honour.
