= St Mary's Church, Clifton =

Coordinates: 52.9080°N 1.1969°W

St. Mary's Church, Clifton
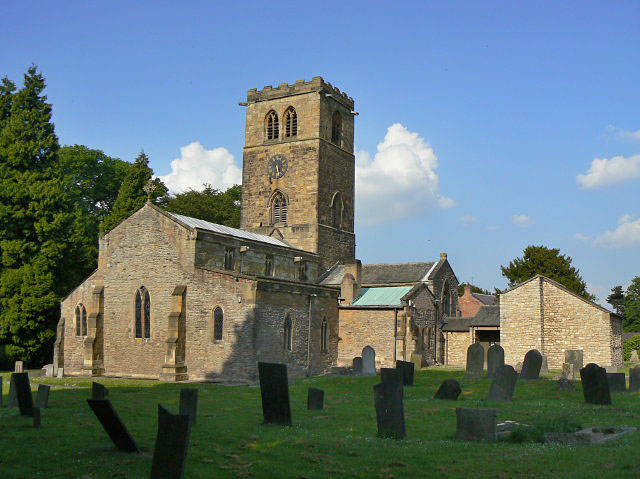
- St. Mary's Church, Clifton
- Denomination: Church of England
- Churchmanship: Broad Church
- Website: www.clifton-village.org.uk/church.htm

History
- Dedication: St. Mary

Administration
- Province: York
- Diocese: Southwell and Nottingham
- Parish: Clifton, Nottinghamshire

St Mary's Church is the parish church of Clifton, in Nottinghamshire, England.

The church is Grade I listed by the Department for Digital, Culture, Media and Sport as a building of outstanding architectural or historic interest.

== History ==
The church is medieval. It was restored by Lewis Nockalls Cottingham in 1846, C. Hodgson Fowler in 1874, George Frederick Bodley in 1884, George Pace and Ronald Sims between 1969 and 1979.

== Features ==
The reredos formerly at the Society of the Sacred Mission at Kelham College and much of the decoration is by George Frederick Bodley.

== Organ ==
The organ is by Marcussen & Søn of Denmark and was installed in 1973. The organist at this time was Ian Abernethy.

== Parsonage ==
The parsonage house was enlarged in 1830 by Henry Moses Wood.

== Sources ==
- The Buildings of England, Nottinghamshire. Nikolaus Pevsner

== See also ==
- Grade I listed buildings in Nottinghamshire
- Listed buildings in Nottingham (Clifton South ward)
- List of works by George Pace
