= Bramley Park =

- Location within Gauteng Location within South Africa
- Coordinates: 26°06′54″S 28°04′35″E
- Country: South Africa
- Province: Gauteng
- Municipality: City of Johannesburg
- Main Place: Sandton

Area
  - Total: 0.54 km^{2} (0.21 sq mi)

Population (2011)
  - Total: 1,161
  - Density: 2,200/km^{2} (5,600/sq mi)

Racial makeup (2011)
  - Black African: 51.6%
  - Coloured: 5.1%
  - Indian/Asian: 16.9%
  - White: 24.5%
  - Other: 1.9%

First languages (2011)
  - English: 53.2%
  - Zulu: 8.6%
  - Northern Sotho: 5.6%
  - Afrikaans: 5.0%
  - Other: 27.6%
- Time zone: UTC+2 (SAST)
- Postal code (street): 2090

Bramley Park is a suburb of Johannesburg, South Africa. It is located in Region E of the City of Johannesburg Metropolitan Municipality.
