= Tamara Karsavina =

Russian ballet dancer (1885–1978)

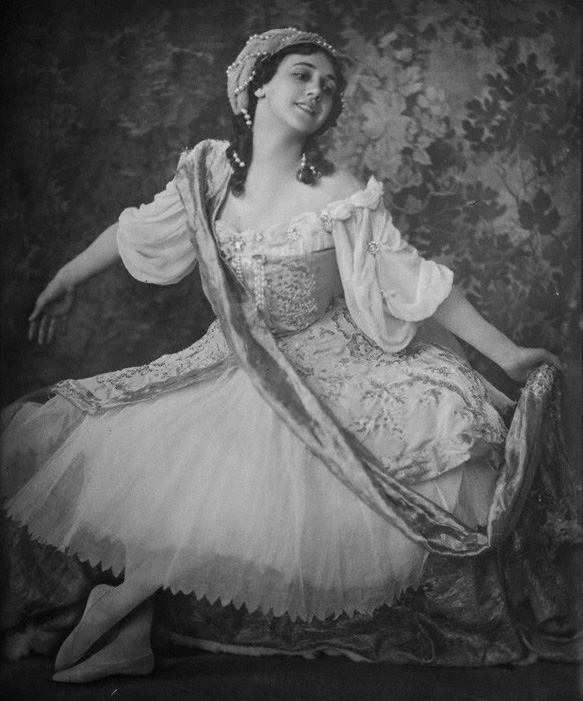
- Karsavina c. 1912
- Born: Tamara Platonovna Karsavina; 9 March 1885; St. Petersburg, Russia
- Died: 26 May 1978 (aged 93); Beaconsfield, Buckinghamshire, England
- Occupation: Ballet dancer
- Spouses: Vasili Vasilievich Mukhin (m. 1907; div. 1917); Henry James Bruce (m. 1918)
- Children: 1

Tamara Platonovna Karsavina (Russian: Тамара Платоновна Карсавина; 9 March 1885 – 26 May 1978) was a Russian prima ballerina, renowned for her beauty, who was a principal artist of the Imperial Russian Ballet and later of the Ballets Russes of Sergei Diaghilev. After settling in Britain at Hampstead in London, she began teaching ballet professionally and became recognised as one of the founders of modern British ballet. She assisted in the establishment of The Royal Ballet and was a founder member of the Royal Academy of Dance, which is now the world's largest dance-teaching organisation.

== Family and early life ==
Tamara Karsavina was born in Saint Petersburg, the daughter of Platon Konstantinovich Karsavin and his wife, Anna Iosifovna (née Khomyakova). A principal dancer and mime with the Imperial Ballet, Platon also taught as an instructor at the Imperial Ballet School (Vaganova Ballet Academy). He counted among his students Michel Fokine, a future dancing partner and paramour of his daughter.

Karsavina's older brother Lev Platonovich Karsavin (1882–1952) became a religious philosopher and medieval historian. Her niece, Marianna Karsavina (1910–1993), married Ukrainian author and artistic patron Pyotr Suvchinsky. Through her mother, Karsavina was distantly related to the religious poet and co-founder of the Slavophile movement, Aleksey Khomyakov.

Karsavina's father had once been the favorite pupil of Marius Petipa, teacher and choreographer, but their relationship deteriorated in later years. Karsavina suspected that Petipa was behind the "political intrigue" that resulted in her father being forced into early retirement. Though Platon continued to teach at the Imperial Ballet School, and also retained some private pupils, he was disillusioned by the experience.

Karsavina later wrote:

I think the blow to their pride meant more than financial considerations to them. After all, we always lived from hand to mouth, never looking ahead, spending more when there was something to spend, fitting in somehow when there wasn't. Father had reason to expect his being kept for the second service, like other artists of his standing. He was sore at heart parting with the stage.

== Education ==
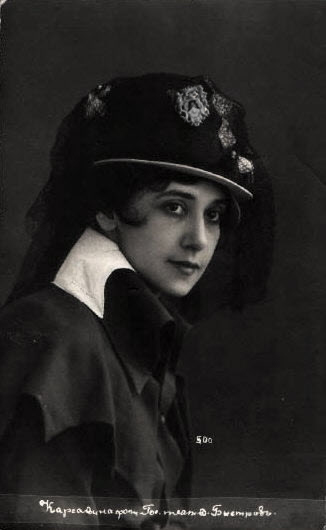
Tamara Platonovna Karsavina, Saint Petersburg, c. 1915

Due to his own bitter experiences, Platon initially refused to allow Karsavina to study ballet, but her mother interceded.

"'Mother's dream was to make a dancer of me,' Karsavina later wrote. "'It is a beautiful career for a woman,' she would say, 'and I think the child must have a leaning for the stage; she is fond of dressing up, and always at the mirror.'"

Without seeking Platon's permission, Karsavina's mother arranged for her to begin taking lessons with a family friend, the retired dancer Vera Joukova. When Platon learned months later that his daughter had begun dancing lessons, he took the news in his stride, becoming her primary instructor. Far from receiving preferential treatment, however, Karsavina referred to her father as her "most exacting teacher... and to the tune of his fiddle I exerted myself to the utmost."

In 1894, after a rigorous examination, Karsavina was accepted at the Imperial Ballet School. At her mother's urging, Karsavina chose to graduate ahead of schedule in early 1902. It was unheard of at that time for women to begin dancing professionally before the age of eighteen, but her father had lost his teaching position at the school in 1896, leaving her family in dire straits financially. They desperately needed the small income Karsavina would receive as a dancer with the corps de ballet.

After graduating from the Imperial Ballet School, Karsavina enjoyed a meteoric rise through the ranks, quickly becoming a leading ballerina with the Imperial Ballet. She danced the whole of the Petipa repertory.

== Career ==
Karsavina's most famous roles were Lise in La Fille Mal Gardée, Medora in Le Corsaire, and the Tsar Maiden in The Little Humpbacked Horse. She was the first ballerina to dance in the so-called Le Corsaire Pas de Deux in 1915.

The choreographer George Balanchine said he had fond memories of watching her when he was a student at the Imperial Ballet School. Shortly before 1910, she was regularly invited to dance in Paris with the Ballets Russes of Sergei Diaghilev. During her years with the company, she created many of her most famous roles in the ballets of Mikhail Fokine, including Petrushka and Le Spectre de la Rose. She danced the latter with Harold Turner. She was perhaps most famous for creating the title role in Fokine's The Firebird with Fokine, her occasional partner. (This role was originally offered to Anna Pavlova, who could not come to terms with Stravinsky's strikingly new score.)

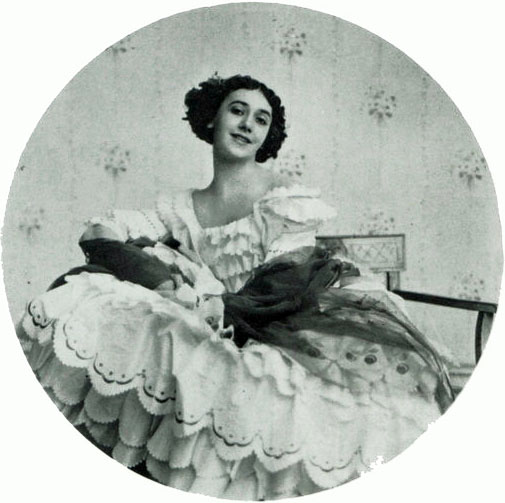
Karsavina, c. 1910

Karsavina left Russia in 1918, just before Red Terror was launched by the Bolsheviks at the beginning of the Russian Civil War, and moved to Paris, where she continued her association with the Ballets Russes as a leading ballerina.

Karsavina's memoir, Theatre Street (the name of the street where the Imperial Ballet School was located, due to its proximity to the Alexandrovskii Theatre), describes her training at the Imperial Ballet School, and her career at the Mariinsky Theatre and the Ballets Russes. In the ultra-competitive world of ballet, she was almost universally beloved. Karsavina did have a rival in Anna Pavlova; yet in Theatre Street, Karsavina always writes of her with kindness and generosity, e.g. "Pavlova at that time [when she was a fellow pupil] hardly realised that in her lithe shape and in her technical limitations lay the greatest strength of her charming personality." In the film, A Portrait of Giselle, Karsavina recalls a "wardrobe malfunction": during a performance one of her shoulder straps fell and she accidentally exposed herself. Pavlova reduced an embarrassed Karsavina to tears.

== Personal life ==
In 1904, guided by her mother, Anna Iosifovna, Karsavina rejected a marriage proposal from Mikhail Fokine. This led to a simmering unease between the two, which coloured their future relationship. She later said that Fokine rarely spoke to her outside the ballet studio.

In 1907, once again guided by her mother, she married the civil servant Vasili Vasilievich Mukhin (1880 – post 1941), in the chapel of the Ballet School. Mukhin occasionally travelled with her on Diaghilev tours.

In June 1918, a year after her divorce from Mukhin, Karsavina married the British diplomat Henry James Bruce (1880–1951). He was the father of her son Nikita (1916–2002).

== Later years ==
Karsavina moved to Hampstead, London, where she continued to socialize with luminaries from the ballet world.

She occasionally assisted with the revival of the ballets in which she had danced, notably Spectre de la Rose, in which she coached Margot Fonteyn and Rudolf Nureyev. She was a ballet teacher to Lady Ursula Manners. In 1959, Karsavina advised Sir Frederick Ashton on his important revival of La Fille Mal Gardée for the Royal Ballet. She taught him Petipa's original mimed dialogue for the celebrated scene "When I'm Married", as well as his choreography for the "Pas de Ruban", two passages which are still retained in Ashton's production.

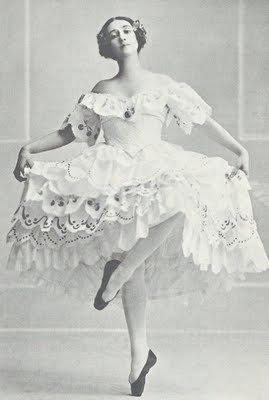
Tamara 1912

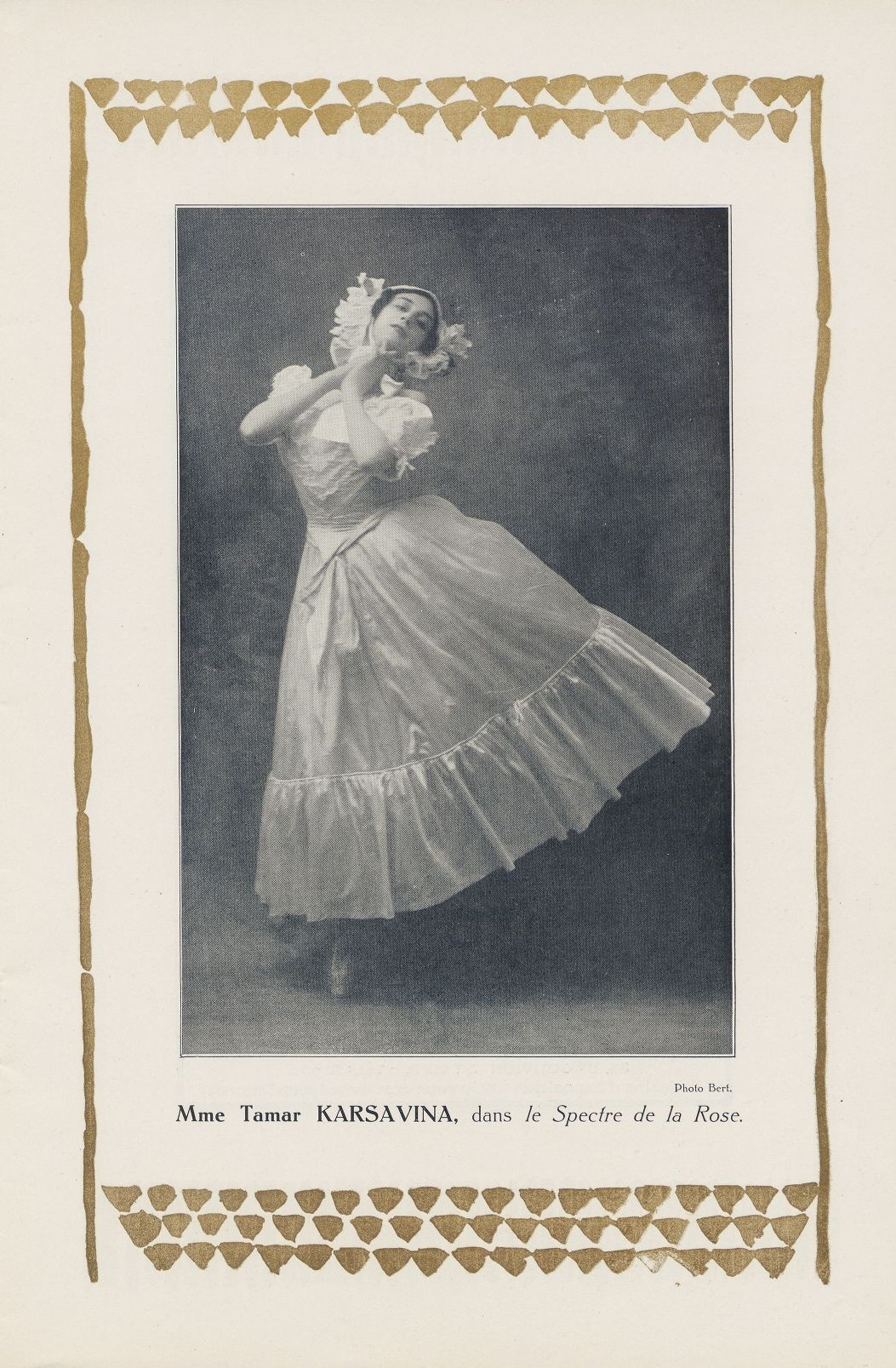
Karsavina with Ballets Russes, 1913

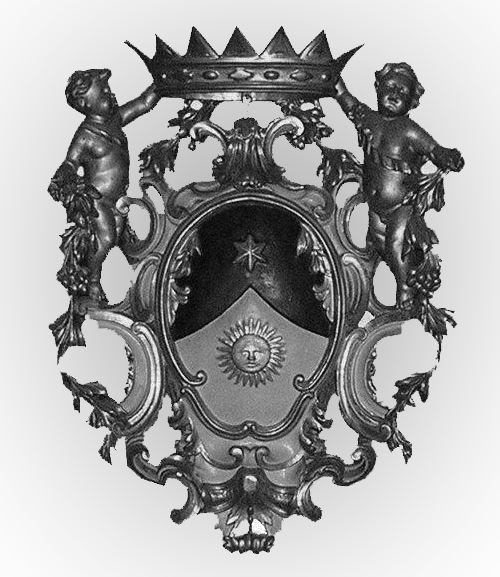
Tamara Karsavina's favorite jewel

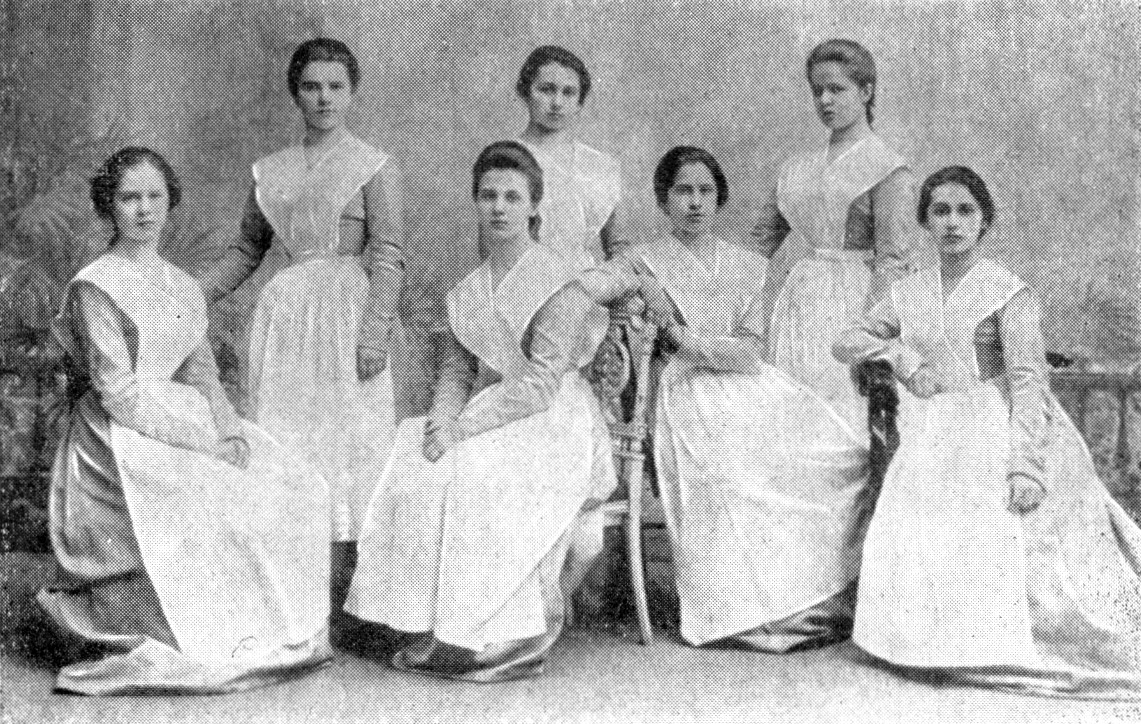
Graduate class of the Imperial Ballet School, 1902. Tamara Karsavina is the rightmost student

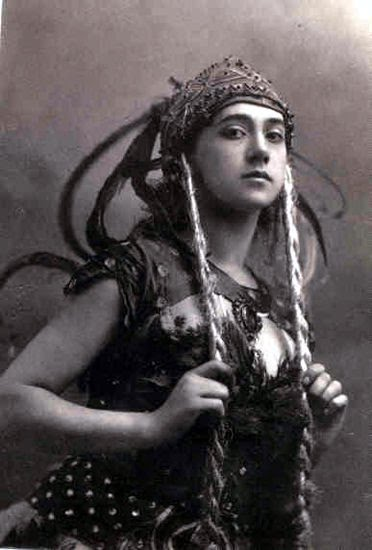
Tamara Karsavina In "L'Oiseau de feu" / Firebird (1910)

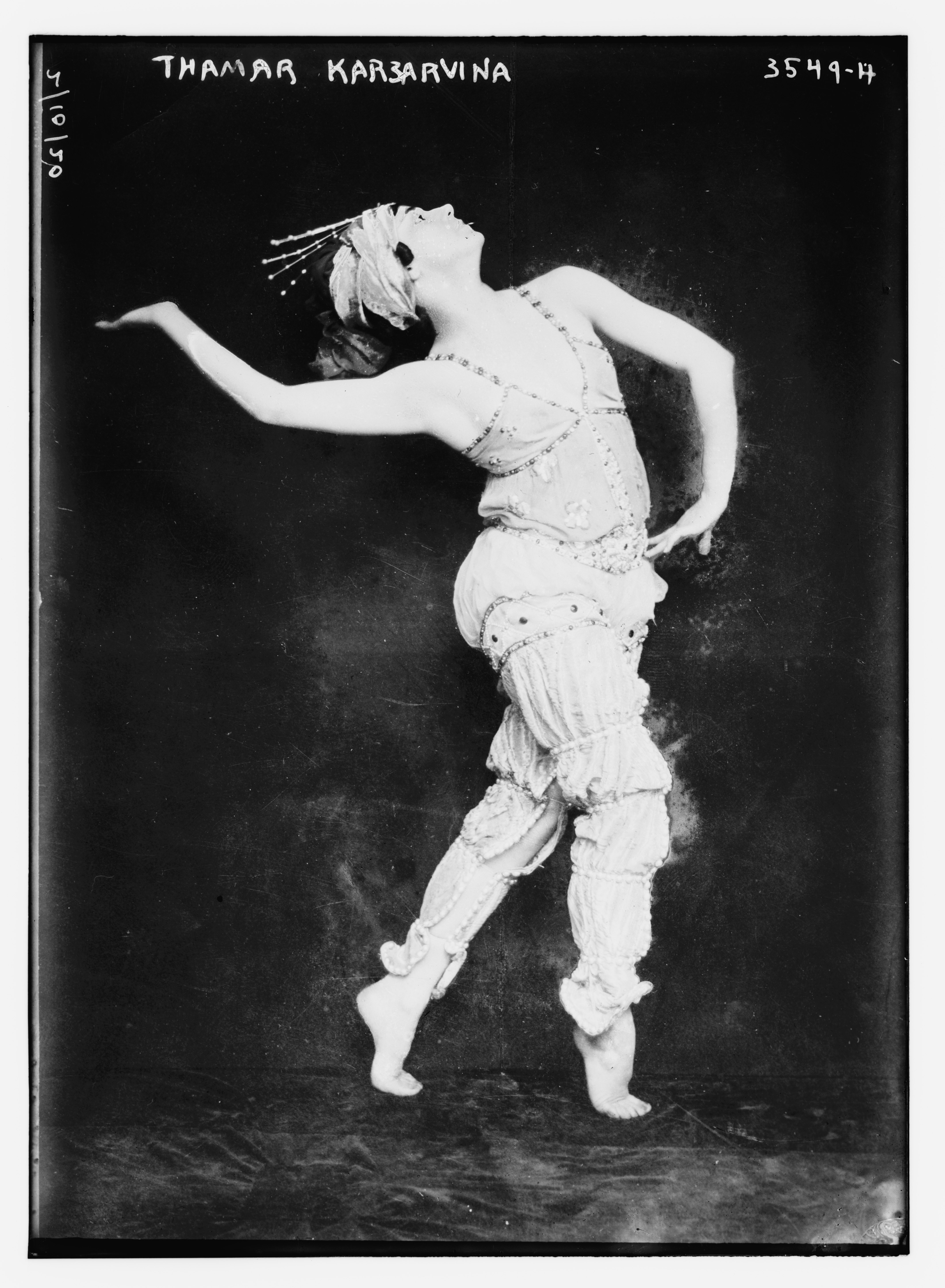

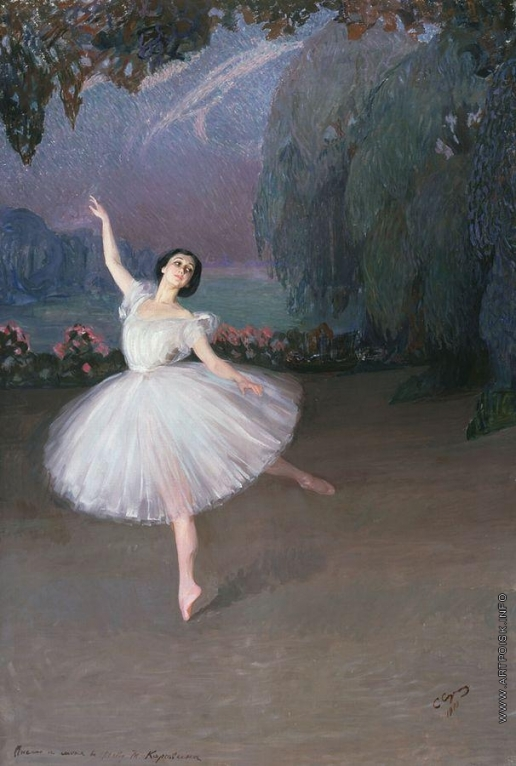
Tamara Karsavina in Les Sylphides by Savely Sorin

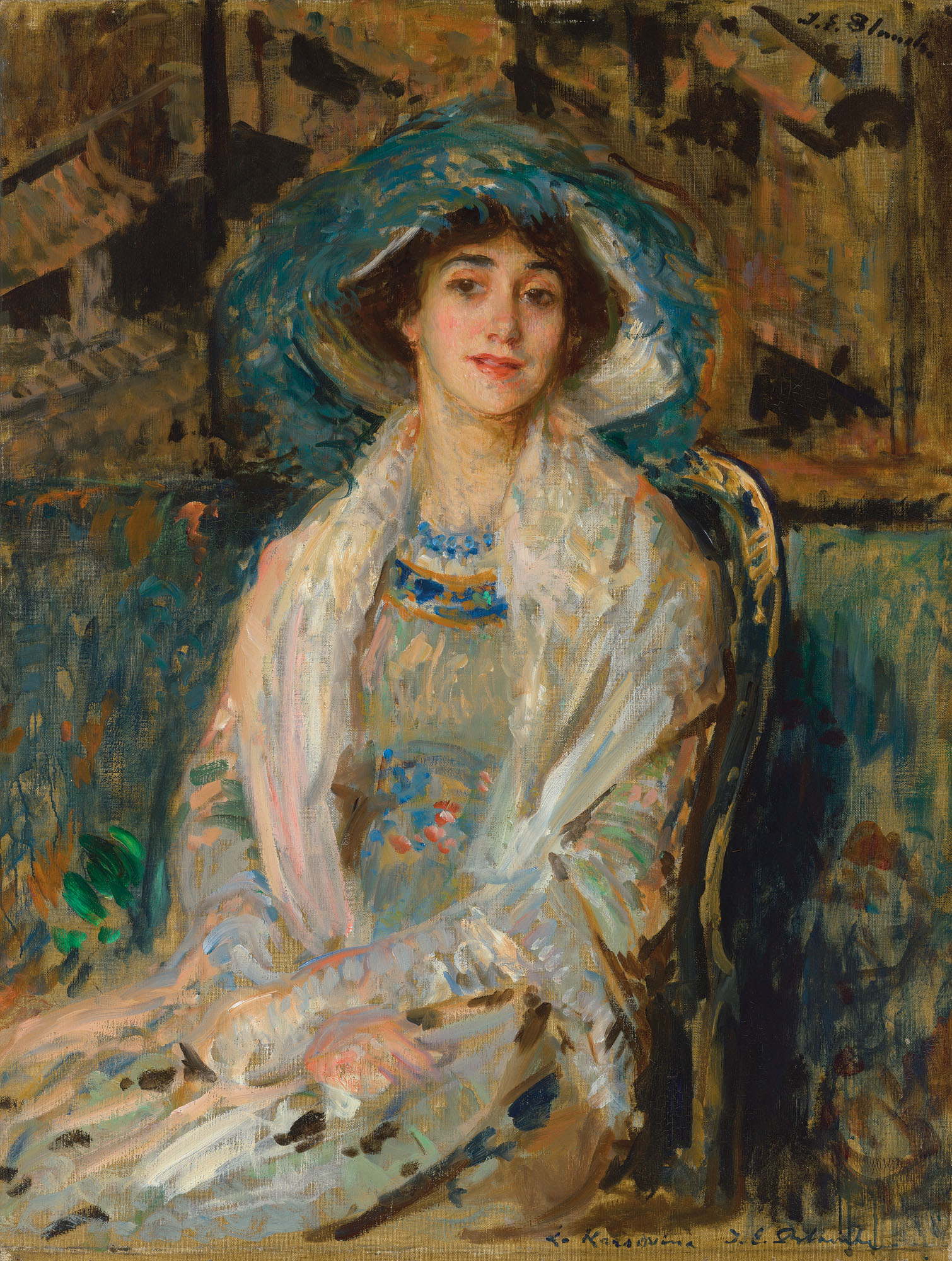
Portrait of Karsavina by Jacques-Émile Blanche

== Publications ==
Tamara Karsavina: "A Recollection of Strawinsky", in Tempo (New Series), No. 8 (Strawinsky Number), Summer 1948, pp. 7–9.

Tamara Karsavina. Theatre Street: The Reminiscences of Tamara Karsavina. London: Heinemann, March 1930; reprinted March 1930. With a foreword by J. M. Barrie. Karsavina's husband affirmed that she wrote her memoir herself, directly in English. Subsequent editions in Russian (and other languages) are translations of it. Second, revised, edition: London: Constable, 1948, and New York: E.P.Dutton, 1950. In a foreword to this edition, dated 20 October 1947, Karsavina states: "I finished writing this book on August 20, 1929, the day I heard of Diaghileff's death. I did not change then what I had written about him: I left him still alive as I had known him. In this revised edition I have done the same. But I have added a chapter in an attempt to bring some unity into the features of Diaghileff's personality, some of which features are scattered about the book."

== See also ==
- List of dancers
- List of Russian ballet dancers
- Women in dance

== Works cited ==
- d'Abo, Lady Ursula (2014). Watkin, David (ed.). The Girl with the Widow's Peak: The Memoirs. London: d'Abo Publications. ISBN 978-1-907991-09-7.
