= Robert Bellamy Clifton =

British scientist

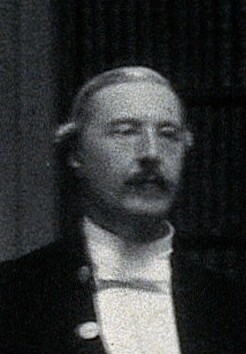
- Born: 13 March 1836; Gedney, Lincolnshire, England
- Died: 21 February 1921 (aged 84); Oxford, England

Robert Bellamy Clifton FRS (13 March 1836 – 21 February 1921) was a British scientist.

== Academic career ==
Clifton was educated at University College, London and St John's College, Cambridge where he studied under Sir George Stokes. In 1860 he went to Owens College, Manchester as Professor of Natural Philosophy. While there he was elected to the membership of Manchester Literary and Philosophical Society on 22 January 1861.

In 1865 he was appointed Professor of experimental Natural Philosophy at Oxford University. While at Oxford he designed Clarendon Laboratory and gave research space to Charles Vernon Boys. On 4 June 1868 he became a fellow of the Royal Society. He was president of the Physical Society (now Institute of Physics) from 1882 until 1884. From 1868 until his retirement in 1915 he was a Fellow of Merton College, Oxford.

== Family ==
Clifton's father was the clergyman Robert Cox Clifton. His daughter Catharine Edith was married to the surgeon Henry Souttar.
