= Sir Gervase Clifton, 2nd Baronet =

English politician

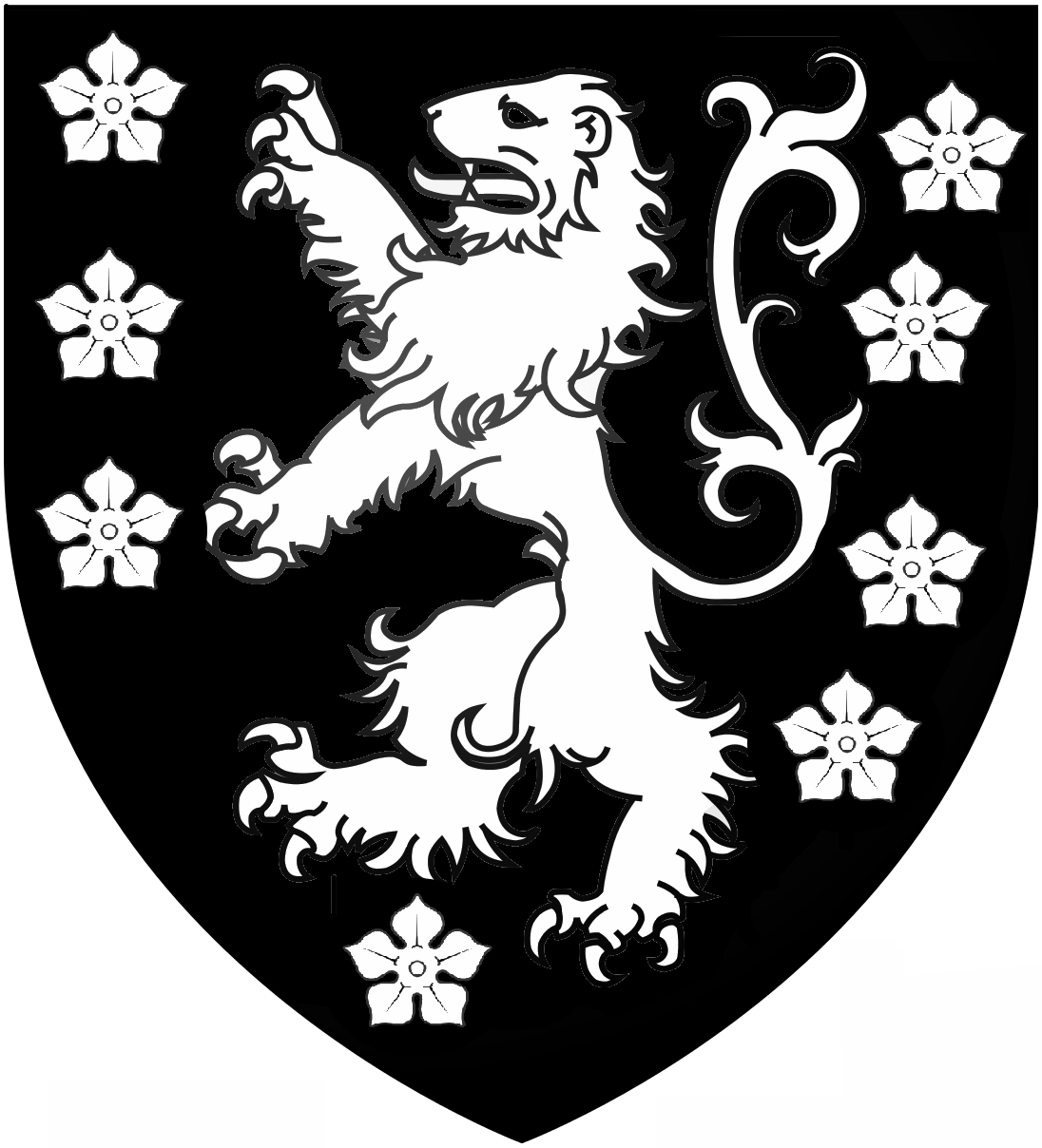
Arms of Clifton of Clifton, Nottinghamshire (Clifton Baronets): Sable semée of cinquefoils and a lion rampant argent

Sir Gervase Clifton (1612–1675) was 2nd Baronet Clifton of Clifton, Nottinghamshire.

== Family ==
Gervase was the only son of Sir Gervase Clifton, 1st Baronet, and his first wife Lady Penelope Rich, daughter of Robert Rich, 1st Earl of Warwick and Lady Penelope Devereux. His mother died in 1613, and his father married six more times and had many more children.

He studied at Trinity College, Cambridge. In 1629 he went on the Grand Tour with his tutor, the philosopher Thomas Hobbes.

He married in 1633 Sara, daughter of Timothy Pusey of Selston, Nottinghamshire. They had no surviving children, although two daughters died in infancy.

== Career ==
He was appointed as a Justice of the Peace for Nottinghamshire in 1635. However, his impulsive behaviour caused conflict with his father. He was described as "the wretched unfortunate, who was his father's greatest foil".

He was imprisoned in 1640 for assaulting two men serving a writ on him for unpaid debts.

In 1648 he relinquished his rights to the Clifton estates in favour of his younger half-brother Clifford.

Gervase succeeded his father as 2nd Baronet in 1666. On his death in 1675 the baronetcy passed to Clifford's son William.

Baronetage of England
Preceded by Sir Gervase Clifton	Baronet (of Clifton, Nottinghamshire); 1666–1675	Succeeded by Sir William Clifton
