= Robert Cox Clifton =

Robert Cox Clifton (1810–1861) was an English churchman, canon of Manchester Cathedral.

== Life ==
Clifton was the son of a clergyman, for many years British chaplain at Bruges, and was born at Gloucester on 4 January 1810. The earlier part of his education was under his father at Worcester. In 1830 he matriculated at Worcester College, Oxford. He proceeded B.A. in 1831 and M.A. in 1834, and took holy orders in 1833, at the hands of the bishop of Oxford. In 1833 he was elected Fellow of his college.

Before taking his first curacy, which was in Berkshire, he spent some time in Oxford as a tutor. In 1837 he was appointed to the office of clerk in orders at the Manchester Collegiate Church, and on 6 December 1843 was elected to a fellowship by the collegiate chapter. When the church was elevated to cathedral dignity he became a canon. In 1843 he was instituted to the rectory of Somerton in Oxfordshire, a benefice he held with his Manchester preferment until his death. He took part in the administration of public charities and religious societies in Manchester, and was a trustee of Owens College, where his son Robert Bellamy Clifton was for some time professor of experimental philosophy.

He died at his rectory at Somerton on 30 July 1861, aged 51.

== Works ==
He published sermons and pamphlets, among which are:

- 'A Letter to the Rev. Dr. Hook on the subject of National Education' (1846);
- 'The Collegiate Church of Manchester from its foundation in 1422 to the present time, with Observations on the proposed Bill for the Subdivision of the Parish of Manchester, and for the Appropriation of the Revenues of the Chapter' (1850).
