= Clifton baronets =

Extinct baronetcy in the Baronetage of England

Two unrelated baronetcies have been created in the surname of Clifton.

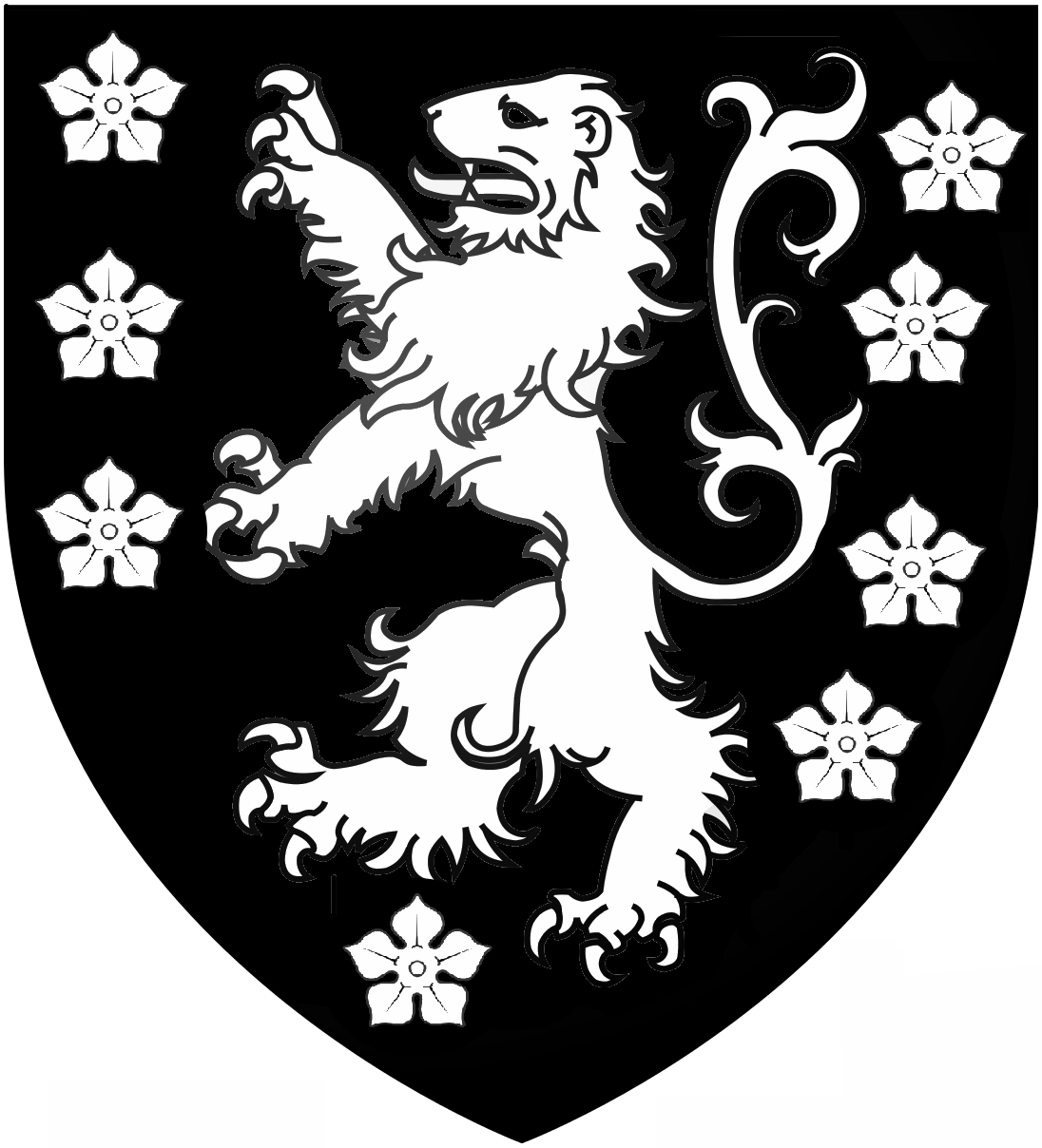
Arms of Clifton of Clifton, Nottinghamshire (Clifton Baronets): Sable semée of cinquefoils and a lion rampant argent

The Clifton Baronetcy, of Clifton in the County of Nottinghamshire, was created in the Baronetage of England on 22 May 1611 for Sir Gervas Clifton, of Clifton Hall, Nottingham. This Clifton family took their name from the settlement on the Bank of the River Trent at Clifton, Nottinghamshire, which they made their home at the time of the Norman Conquest. The family was much involved in the events of its times. Several members of the family served from the 13th century as High Sheriff of the counties of Nottinghamshire and Derbyshire. Sir John Clifton was slain fighting for the King at the Battle of Shrewsbury in 1402. Sir Gervase Clifton was captured and beheaded following the Battle of Tewkesbury during the Wars of the Roses in 1471.

The first Baronet was the grandson of Sir Gervase Clifton (High Sheriff of Derbyshire and Nottinghamshire in 1547 and of Nottinghamshire only in 1571) whom he succeeded at the age of only four months in 1588. He was created a Knight of the Bath at the coronation of James I in 1603 and was elevated to baronet in 1611. He served as High Sheriff for Nottinghamshire in 1610 and Deputy Lieutenant 1626–42 and 1660–1666. He was Member of Parliament for Nottinghamshire 1614–1625, 1628–29 and 1661–66, for Nottingham in 1626 and for East Retford 1640–46. He married seven times and was succeeded by the sons and grandsons of three of those wives.

The Baronetcy was extinct on the death of the 9th Baronet. The Nottinghamshire estate remained in the family ownership until 1958. The family of Clifton of Clifton bore arms: Sable semée of cinquefoils argent a lion rampant of the second armed and langued gules

Gervase Clifton, 1st Baron Clifton (c.1570-1618) of Barrington Court in Somerset, was a descendant of the Nottinghamshire family and shared as a common ancestor with the Clifton baronets Sir Gervase Clifton (d.1508), Knight of the Bath (1494), of Clifton Hall, Nottingham, High Sheriff of Nottinghamshire, Derbyshire and the Royal Forests in 1502. From the latter's eldest son Robert Clifton were descended the Clifton baronets whilst from one of his younger sons, Gervase Clifton of the Customs House, London, was descended in the third generation the 1st Baron Clifton.

According to Robson, The British Herald (1830), his family bore the same arms as Clifton of Clifton; however a differenced version: Argent semée of cinquefoils gules a lion rampant of the second is visible impaled by Bampfylde on the monument of Sir Amyas Bampfylde (1560–1626), brother-in-law of Gervase Clifton, 1st Baron Clifton, in North Molton Church, Devon. (possibly therefore restored incorrectly).

The Clifton Baronetcy, of Clifton in the County of Lancaster, was created on 4 March 1661 for Thomas Clifton of Clifton Hall, near Lytham, Lancashire who was descended from Gilbert de Clifton, High Sheriff of Lancashire on four occasions in the 13th century. The Baronetcy became extinct on his death in 1694.

== Clifton of Clifton, Nottinghamshire (1611) ==
- Sir Gervase Clifton, 1st Baronet (1587–1666) "Sir Gervase with seven wives"
- Sir Gervase Clifton, 2nd Baronet (1612–1675)
- Sir William Clifton, 3rd Baronet (1653–1686). Nephew of the 2nd Baronet, and son of Clifford Clifton, second son of the 1st Baronet.
- Sir Gervase Clifton, 4th Baronet (1666–1731). Cousin of the 3rd Baronet and son of Robert Clifton, third son of the 1st Baronet. Briefly imprisoned as a Jacobite sympathiser in 1715
- Sir Robert Clifton, 5th Baronet (1690–1767). Member of Parliament for East Retford 1727–41
- Sir Gervase Clifton, 6th Baronet (1744–1815). High Sheriff of Nottinghamshire in 1767
- Sir Robert Clifton, 7th Baronet (1767–1837). High Sheriff of Nottinghamshire in 1820
- Sir Juckes Granville Juckes-Clifton, 8th Baronet (1769–1852). Brother of the 7th Baronet. Changed his name in 1790 to Juckes but reverted to Juckes-Clifton on succession. High Sheriff 1840.
- Sir Robert Juckes Clifton, 9th Baronet (1826–1869). Member of Parliament for Nottingham 1861–65 and 1868

== Clifton of Clifton, Lancashire (1661) ==
Escutcheon of the Clifton baronets of Clifton, Lancashire

- Sir Thomas Clifton, 1st Baronet (1628–1694)

== See also ==
- Wintringham baronets

Baronetage of England
Preceded by Tollemache baronets	Clifton baronets 22 May 1611	Succeeded by Gerard baronets
