= Sir Gervase Clifton, 1st Baronet =

English politician

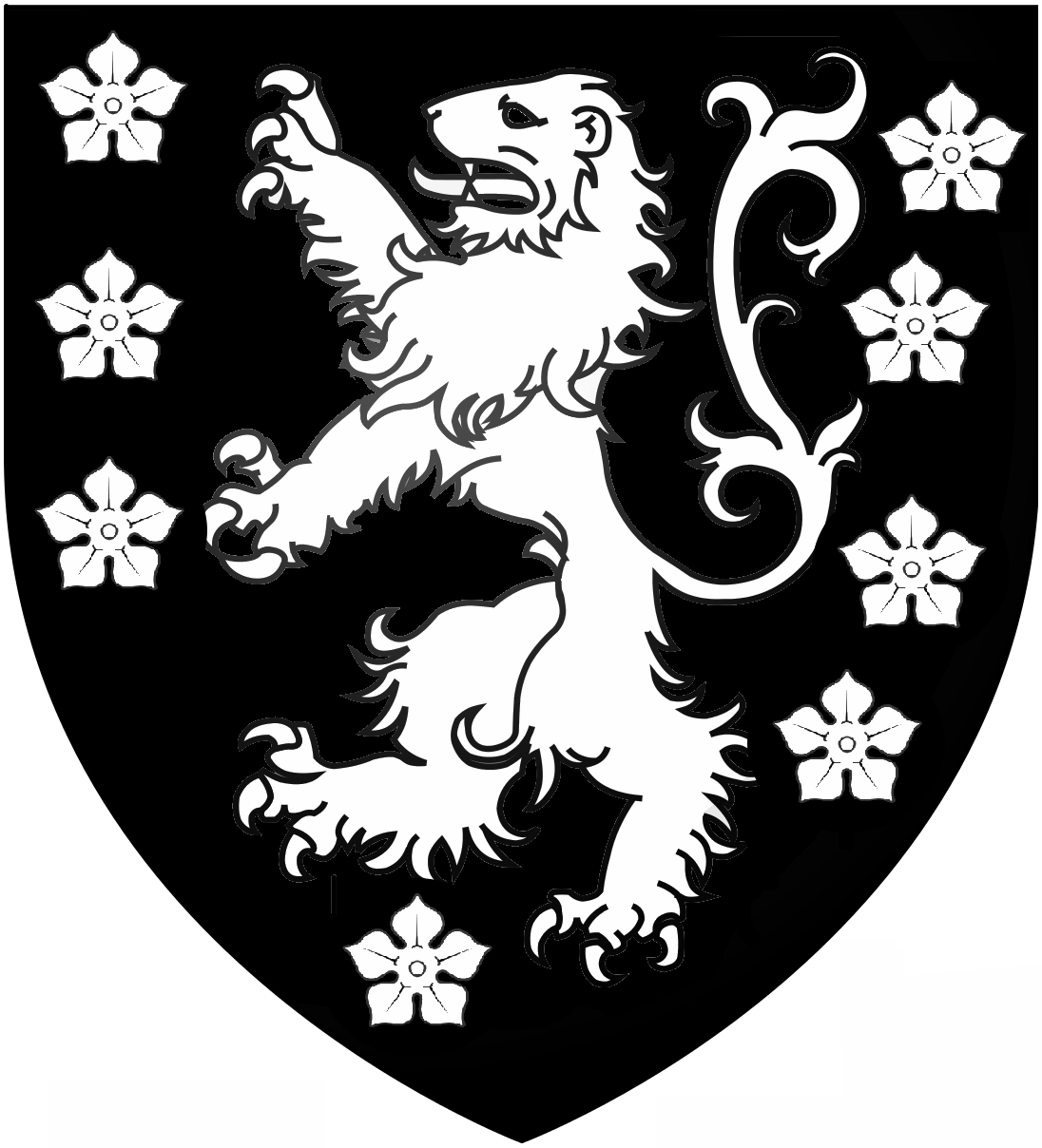
Arms of Clifton of Clifton, Nottinghamshire (Clifton Baronets): Sable semée of cinquefoils and a lion rampant argent

Sir Gervase Clifton, 1st Baronet, K.B. (25 November 1587 – 28 June 1666) was an English politician who sat in the House of Commons at various times between 1614 and 1666. He supported the Royalist cause in the English Civil War. He was educated at St John's College, Cambridge.

== Political career ==
In 1603, at the English coronation of King James I, Clifton was made a Knight of the Order of the Bath. He became a Justice of the Peace for Nottinghamshire in 1609, remaining until 1646. In 1611, he was third on the list of creations for the new order of baronet. He was active in local Nottinghamshire and national politics in both the reign of James I and Charles I. He was High Sheriff of Nottinghamshire in 1610 and High Steward of East Retford from 1616 to 1647. During the reign of King James he was elected Member of Parliament for Nottinghamshire in 1614, 1621, 1624 and 1625. He was County Treasurer from 1625 to 1626, and Deputy Lieutenant from 1626 to 1642. In 1626, he was elected MP for Nottingham and in 1628, he was re-elected MP for Nottinghamshire in 1628. He sat until 1629 when King Charles decided to rule without parliament for eleven years.

In November 1640, Clifton was elected MP for East Retford in the Long Parliament. He took up arms in the King's cause in the Civil War and was commissioned as Colonel of a regiment of Nottinghamshire Trained Bands defending Newark-on-Trent. He was a Commissioner for the King at Newark and Oxford, and a Commissioner of Array for Lincolnshire and Nottinghamshire in 1642. When King Charles called for members of the Long Parliament loyal to him to meet in session Oxford Clifton did so and was disabled from sitting in parliament at Westminster. With the defeat of the Royalist cause in 1646 and the capture of the King, Clifton lost his political influence both nationally and locally. He was declared a "delinquent" and fined £7,625 (equivalent to £1,567,092 in 2023). By the time sequestration of his estates was ended in 1650 he had paid off about half of the money. He was not active in politics again until after the restoration of the monarchy in 1660.

After the Restoration he regained his influence in Nottinghamshire and, from 1660, served Justice of the Peace for Nottinghamshire, High Steward of East Retford and Deputy Lieutenant. He was re-elected MP for Nottinghamshire in 1661 for the Cavalier Parliament. He held all these positions until his death, aged 78, in 1666.

== Family ==
Clifton was born to his mother Lady Winifred Thorold three months after the death of his father Sir George Clifton, in 1587. The next year, with the death of his grandfather, Sir Gervase Clifton, he inherited the Clifton estates in Nottinghamshire. His guardians were his uncle, William Thorold, and Lord Burghley, although his early care fell to his maternal grandmother Lady Anne Thorold. Later he was educated at St John's College, Cambridge, and at the Inner Temple.

Clifton was married seven times and had thirteen children.

He married Lady Penelope Rich (died 26 October 1613), daughter of Charles Blount (while her mother was married to Robert Rich, 1st Earl of Warwick), and Lady Penelope Devereux. This marriage produced one son:

- Sir Gervase Clifton, 2nd Baronet (ca.1612–1676)

He married Lady Frances Clifford (died 1627), daughter of Francis Clifford, 4th Earl of Cumberland, and Grisold Hughes. This marriage produced six children

- Margaret Clifton (d. Feb 1697/98)
- Frances Clifton
- Anne Clifton
- Lettice Clifton (d. 1659)
- Elizabeth Clifton
- Clifford Clifton (1626–1670)

He married Mary Egioke (died 1630), daughter of John Egioke of Egioke Manor, Inkberrow, Worcestershire, by his wife Anne, daughter of Nicholas Huband, of Ipsley, Warwickshire.

He married Isobel Meek (died 1637).

He married Anne South (died 1639), daughter of Sir Francis South of Kelstern, Lincolnshire.

He married Jane Eyre (died 1655), daughter of Anthony Eyre of Laughton-en-le-Morthen, Nottinghamshire, and Rampton, Nottinghamshire. This marriage produced four children:

- Jane Clifton
- Charles Clifton
- Mary Clifton
- Robert Clifton (b. 1641) – eldest son became Sir Gervase Clifton, 4th Baronet

Lastly, he married Lady Alice Hastings, daughter of Henry Hastings, 5th Earl of Huntingdon, and Lady Elizabeth Stanley, on 17 December 1656 at St Andrew Undershaft, London.

== Notes ==
Parliament of England
Preceded by Sir Percival Willoughby; Sir John Holles	Member of Parliament for Nottinghamshire; 1614–1625; With: Sir John Holles 1614; George Chaworth 1621; Robert Sutton 1624; Sir Henry Stanhope 1625	Succeeded by Sir Henry Stanhope; Sir Thomas Hutchinson
Preceded by Robert Greaves; John Martyn	Member of Parliament for Nottingham; 1626; With: John Byron	Succeeded by Viscount Newark; Charles Cavendish
Preceded by Sir Henry Stanhope; Sir Thomas Hutchinson	Member of Parliament for Nottinghamshire; 1628–1629; With: John Byron	Parliament suspended until 1640
Vacant Parliament suspended since 1629	Member of Parliament for East Retford; 1640–1644; With: Francis Pierrepont 1644; Charles Cavendish, Viscount Mansfield 1640–1644	Succeeded by Francis Thornhagh; Sir William Lister
Baronetage of England
New creation	Baronet (of Clifton); 1611–1666	Succeeded by Gervase Clifton
