= Manor of Clifton =

Manor house in Nottingham, England

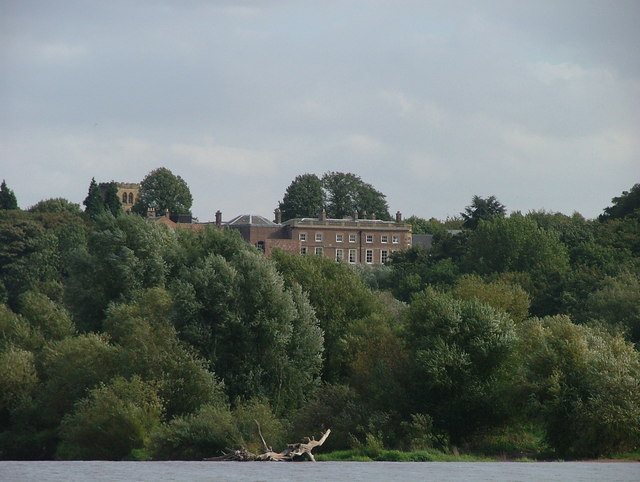
Clifton Hall standing above the River Trent, viewed from north-west

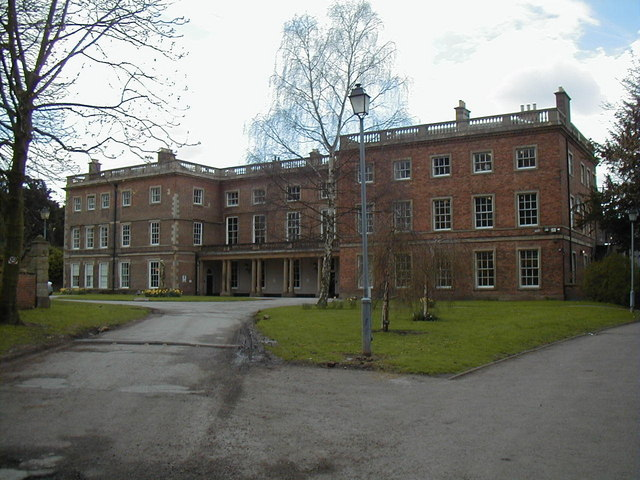
Clifton Hall, east front

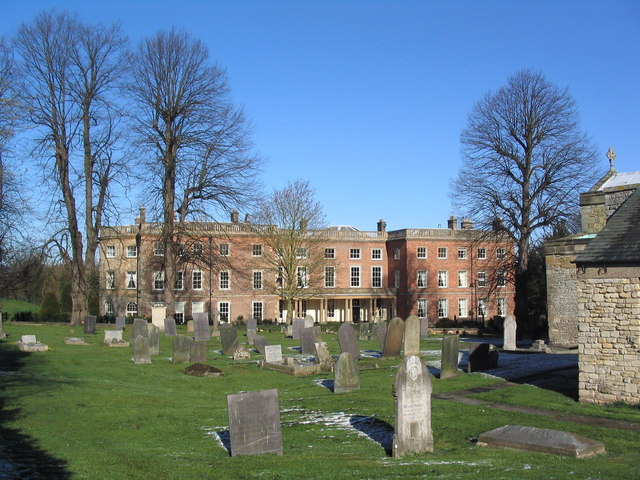
Clifton Hall in 2008, east front, viewed from graveyard of the Church of St Mary the Virgin

The Manor of Clifton was a historic manor situated near the City of Nottingham, England. The manor house, known as Clifton Hall is situated on the right bank of the River Trent in the village of Clifton, Nottinghamshire, (grid reference SK54043483). about 3 1/2 miles south-west of the historic centre of the City of Nottingham, now partly the campus of Nottingham Trent University and partly a large council estate of modern housing.

The Hall is a 13,946 square feet (1,295.6 m^{2}) Grade I listed building, and is situated within the Clifton Village Conservation Area. Clifton Hall was remodelled in the late 18th century in Georgian style. The manor was held by the de Clifton (later Clifton) family from the late 13th century to the mid-20th century.

== History ==
=== Domesday Book ===
The manor of Clifton was noted in the Domesday Book of 1086. Clifton Hall is on top of a cliff on the edge of the village of Clifton, overlooking the River Trent, probably because the site was easily defensible. Clifton Hall was originally a fortified tower house, designed for defence as well as habitation.

=== de Clifto ===
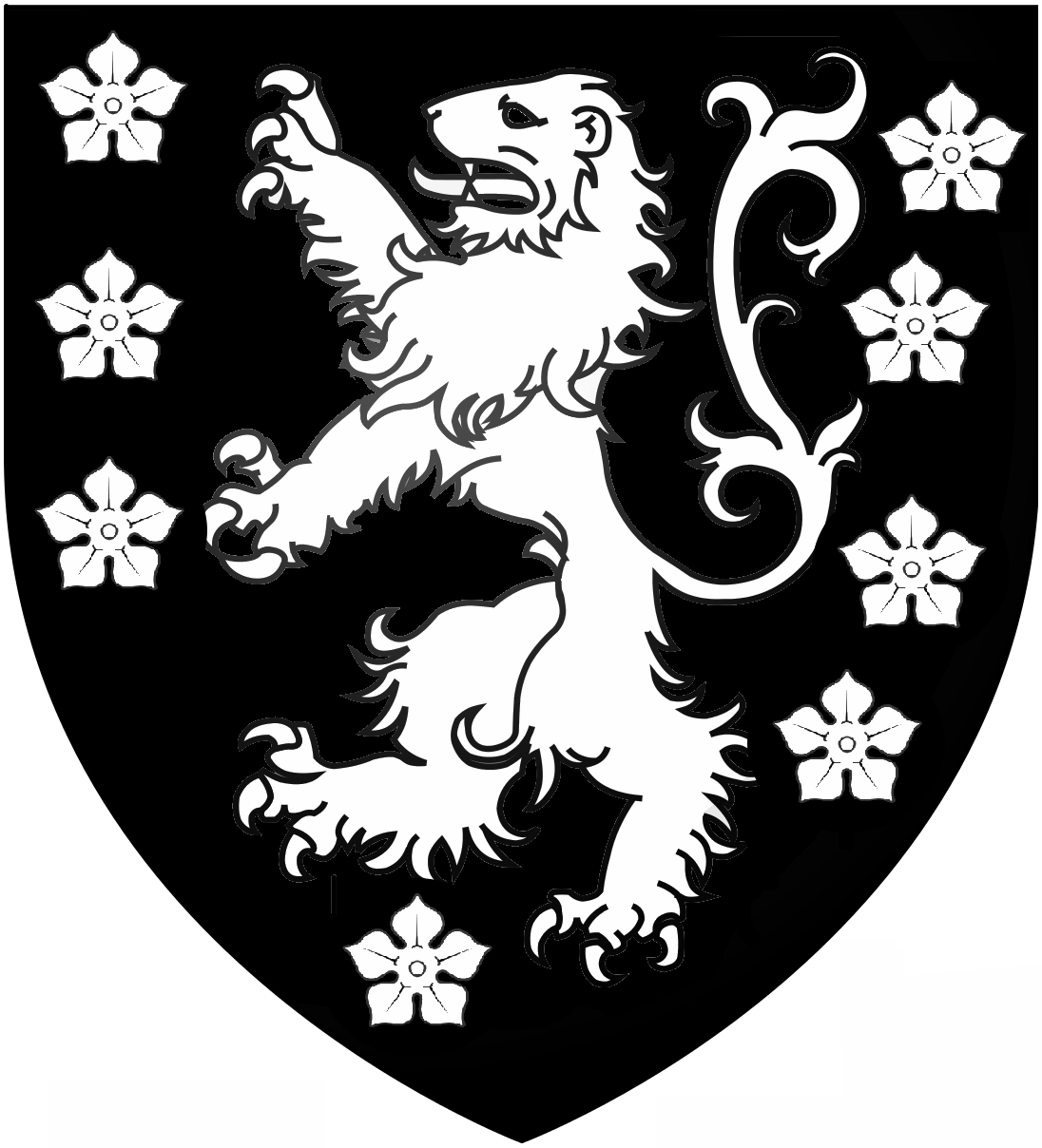
Arms of Clifton of Clifton, Nottingham: Sable semée of cinquefoils and a lion rampant argent

- Gervase de Clifton (fl. late 13th c.). In the late 13th century, Gervase de Clifton purchased the manor of Clifton (together with nearby Wilford) from the de Rodes family, and adopted the surname de Clifton from his new seat. His family had long been settled in the area and his earliest known English ancestor was the 11th century Alvaredus, warden of Nottingham Castle.
- Sir Gervase de Clifton (d. 1324), four times High Sheriff of Nottinghamshire, Derbyshire and the Royal Forests firstly in 1279, also four times Sheriff of Yorkshire. He was MP for Nottinghamshire in 1294.
- Sir Gervase de Clifton (1313-1391), High Sheriff of Nottinghamshire, Derbyshire and the Royal Forests 1345, Escheator in 1345 and MP in 1347–48. In 1367 he was a Commissioner of Array for Nottinghamshire.
- Sir John de Clifton (d. 1403) (grandson), MP for Nottinghamshire in 1402, High Sheriff of Nottinghamshire, Derbyshire and the Royal Forests. Created a Knight Banneret by King Henry IV before the Battle of Shrewsbury in 1403, in which battle he was killed. In 1382 he married Cathering Cressy, daughter and heiress of Sir John Cressy of Hodsock. Her inheritance of Hodsock and other estates in north Nottinghamshire and in Yorkshire came to the Clifton family.
- Sir Gervase Clifton (d. 1453), only son, MP for Nottinghamshire in 1425–26, and several times appointed a JP for Nottinghamshire. He married Isabel Fraunceys (d. 13 June 1457), the daughter of Sir Robert Fraunceys of Foremark, Derbyshire.
- Sir Gervase Clifton (d. 1471), beheaded after the Battle of Tewkesbury. He was son of Sir Gervase Clifton (d. 15 November 1453) only son of Sir John Clifton (d. 1403) by his wife, Katherine Cressy.
- Sir Gervase Clifton (1438-1491) (grandson of Sir Gervase Clifton, d. 1453), was a Yorkists during the Wars of the Roses. He was appointed Treasurer of Calais in 1482. He fought on the losing side for King Richard III at the Battle of Bosworth in 1485.
- Sir Gervase Clifton (d. 1588), Gervase the Gentle. His father died during his infancy. He was a favourite of successive Tudor monarchs.
- Sir Gervase Clifton, 1st Baronet (1587-1666) Gervase the Great (grandson), as an infant succeeded his grandfather. MP and in 1611 was created a Baronet. He married seven times. King Charles I stayed at Clifton Hall in 1632 as his guest. He prepared for the royal visit by extending his stables, to the design of John Smythson, son of the renowned Jacobean architect Robert Smythson; other works may have been undertaken at the same time, but none survive. In 1608 a junior branch of the family was created Baron Clifton of Leighton Bromswold in Huntingdonshire.

== Description of Hall ==
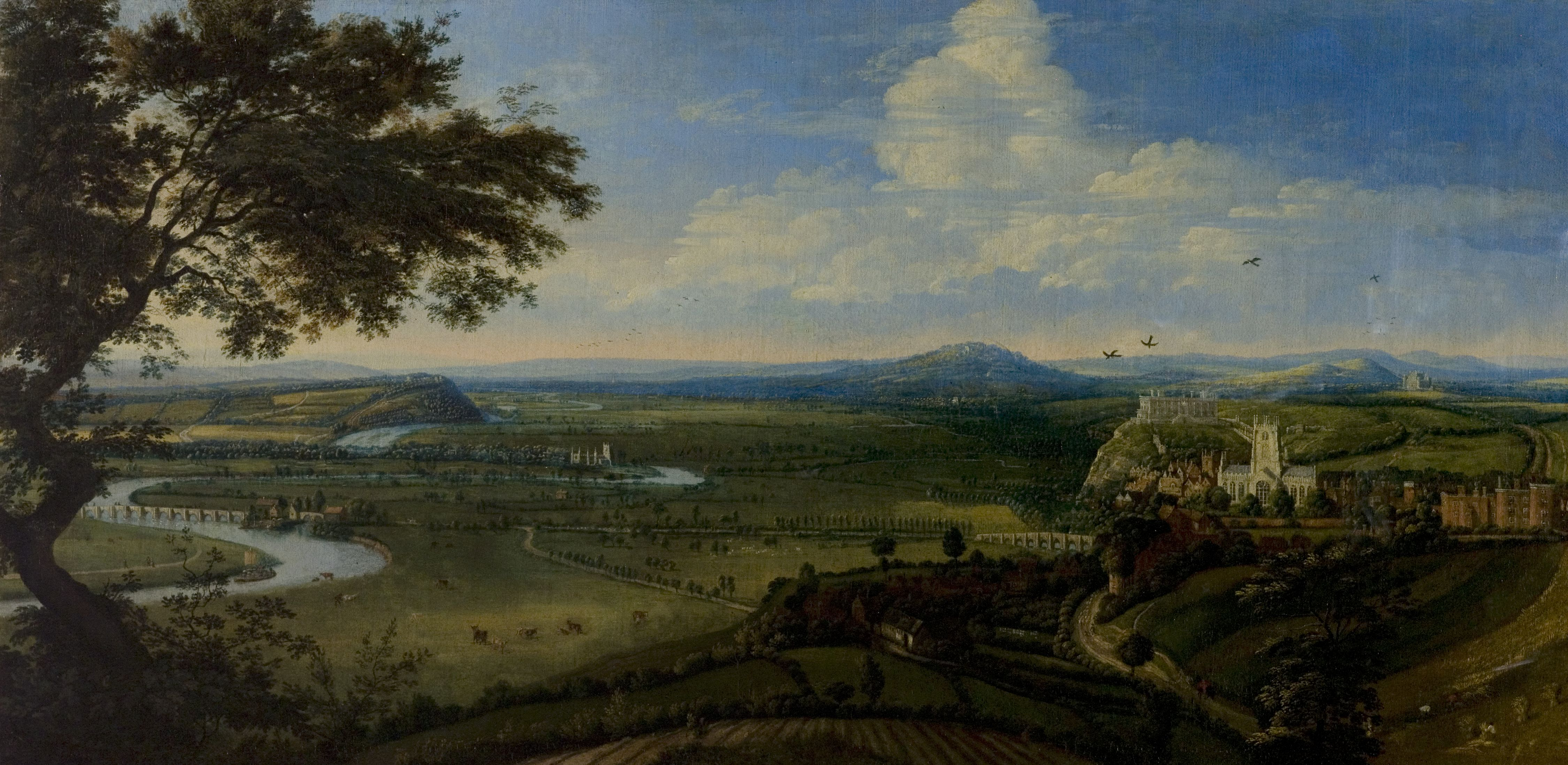
Cliftons Elm grove can be seen in the distance to the left in this 1695 landscape painting by Jan Siberechts

The Hall was three stories high. Clifton Grove, a 2 miles (3.2 km) long double avenue of elm trees running alongside the River Trent to Wilford, was probably planted by Sir Gervase Clifton, 6th Baronet in the late 17th century. Clifton was well known in the 19th century for its grassy terraces and the grove.

=== Rebuild ===
The house was largely rebuilt between 1778 and 1797 by a later Sir Gervase Clifton, who employed the premier architect in the north of England John Carr of York. It was probably during this remodelling that the tower of the original house was demolished. The octagonal domed hall built by Sir Robert Clifton, which incorporated many of the old rooms of the house, c. 1750 was retained during the rebuilding. The south wing of the Hall is Carr's work, but the north wing is of a later date, probably used by servants as quarters and a working area.

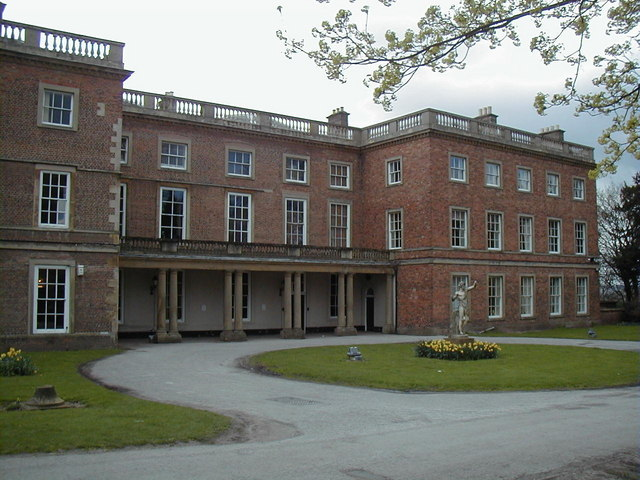
Clifton Hall, east front entrance

In 1896 Sir Hervey Juckes Lloyd Bruce, 4th Baronet (1843–1919) succeeded his cousin Henry Robert Clifton, to part of the Clifton estates. The early Bruce years at Clifton are recalled in Henry James Bruce's book Silken Dalliance (1946).

Lieutenant Colonel Peter Thomas Clifton began in the 1940s to sell off the remainder of the Clifton family estates. A local legend states erroneously that a portrait in the Hall of the colonel on horseback was originally intended to be one of his daughter, but was changed when she died while it was being painted, in a riding accident in Clifton Grove. The story is however untrue as both of the colonel's daughters outlived the colonel and later married. Further alterations were made in the 19th century and a conversion in 1953, when the south front was most likely altered as seen in the photos from c. 1900.

In 1947, 944 acres (382 ha) (3,820,000 sqm) of the family's land in Clifton was sold and an auction of the contents of Clifton Hall was held in 1953. In 1958 Peter Thomas Clifton sold Clifton Hall and the remains of the estate, thus ending a period of 700 years of ownership by his family.

=== After the Clifton family ===
In 1958 the Hall became Clifton Hall Girls' Grammar School, which closed in 1976. Nottingham Trent University, then Trent Polytechnic, then used the Hall until 2002. In the early 2000s it was sold to Chek Whyte, who built houses on the grounds and converted Clifton Hall into two luxury apartments, the South Wing and the North Wing. Fourteen houses were built to the south east of the Hall. Anwar Rashid bought the South Wing in January 2007 and applied to Nottingham City Council for a licence to hold weddings. In May 2007 the council refused planning permission to hold civil ceremonies and partnerships, conferences, training courses or media events.

- t
