= Downhill, County Londonderry =

Village in County Londonderry, Northern Ireland

- village and townland
- Coordinates: 55°09′50″N 6°49′29″W

Downhill is a small village and townland near Castlerock in County Londonderry, Northern Ireland. It is situated within Causeway Coast and Glens district. It was visited by the Lewis brothers (Warren and C.S. Lewis) in their childhood, when, in July 1901, their nurse took them for a visit while on a holiday in Castlerock.

Downhill Strand runs along the coast between Benone Strand and the cliffs immediately beneath Mussenden Temple. Downhill Burn flows from the hills above Downhill, flowing through the village of Downhill and crossing under the main road and under the railway, flowing on across Downhill Strand and emptying directly into the Atlantic Ocean. Sometimes, all of Benone Strand is referred to as Downhill Strand.

== History ==
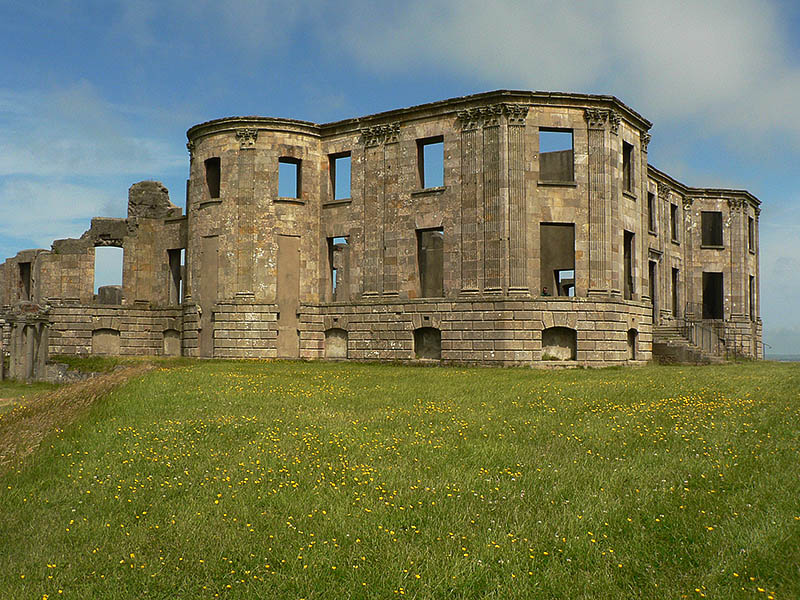
Downhill House

The area where Downhill is located was formerly called Dunbo, derived from the Irish Dún Bó, meaning "fort of the cows".

Bishop Hervey (pronounced 'Harvey') succeeded as The 4th Earl of Bristol in December 1779, becoming popularly known thereafter as 'the Earl Bishop'.

== Transport ==
- Downhill railway station was opened on 18 July 1853, closed for passenger services on 3 September 1973, and finally closed altogether on 18 October 1976.

== See also ==
- Downhill Strand
