= Causeway Coast and Glens =

Local government district in Northern Ireland

- District and borough
- Causeway Coast near Ballycastle
- Motto: Latin: Integerrime Servire, lit. 'service with integrity'
- Causeway Coast and Glens shown within Northern Ireland
- Coordinates: 55.203°N 6.500°W
- Sovereign state: United Kingdom
- Country: Northern Ireland
- Incorporated: 1 April 2015
- Named for: Causeway Coast and the Glens of Antrim
- Administrative HQ: Cloonavin, Coleraine

Government
  - Type: District council
  - Body: Causeway Coast and Glens Borough Council
  - Executive: Committee system
  - Control: No overall control

Area
  - Total: 760 sq mi (1,980 km^{2})
  - Rank: 2nd

Population (2025)
  - Total: 141,752
  - Rank: 9th
  - Density: 190/sq mi (72/km^{2})
- Time zone: UTC+0 (GMT)
  - Summer (DST): UTC+1 (BST)
- Postcode areas: BT
- Dialling codes: 028
- ISO 3166 code: GB-CCG
- GSS code: N09000004
- Website: causewaycoastandglens.gov.uk

Causeway Coast and Glens is a local government district covering most of the northern part of Northern Ireland. It was created on 1 April 2015 by merging the Borough of Ballymoney, the Borough of Coleraine, the Borough of Limavady and the District of Moyle. The local authority is Causeway Coast and Glens Borough Council.

== Geography ==
The district covers most of the northern part of Northern Ireland; an area totalling 1796 km^{2} spanning parts of Counties Antrim and Londonderry. It had a population of around 141,752 in 2025. The name of the new district was announced on 17 September 2008 as 'Causeway Coast' and was revised in February 2009.

== Northern Ireland Railways stations ==
- Bellarena station
- Castlerock station
- Coleraine station
- Ballymoney
- University station
- Dhu Varren station
- Portrush station

=== Rail services ===
NI Railways provides services on the Belfast-Derry railway line between Derry~Londonderry station in the west and east to Belfast Lanyon Place station and Belfast Grand Central station.

The Coleraine-Portrush line provides a service from the interchange at Coleraine station at the south of the branch with Portrush station the station terminal at the north of the branch line.

=== Giant's Causeway and Bushmills Railway ===
The Giant's Causeway and Bushmills Railway is a heritage railway and major tourist attraction.

== Coastal physical geography ==
The area stretches around from the River Roe near Bellarena on the shores of Lough Foyle, with Magilligan Point with Benone Strand on the Atlantic Ocean, and Mussenden Temple perched on the cliffs to Castlerock. At Castlerock the first of the seaside resorts the estuary of the River Bann is reached with crossing points located upstream at Coleraine. From the River Bann the coast includes seaside resorts of Portstewart and Portrush. Further along there is Dunluce Castle, Portballintrae and the town of Bushmills. Whilst Bushmills (home to the world's oldest licensed distillery which has produced the famous Irish whiskey "Bushmills" since 1608). The River Bush is crossed beside the Giant's Causeway and Bushmills Railway, and the Giant's Causeway is nearby. The next place are Ballintoy, and onwards to Ballycastle

The area is popular with tourists and includes some of the best-known physical features of Northern Ireland: the Giant's Causeway (a World Heritage Site), the Glens of Antrim and Rathlin Island, which lies 7 miles off Ballycastle. The coast includes Carrick-a-Rede Rope Bridge and the small Dunseverick Castle, and the more isolated seaside resort of Ballycastle, with a ferry to Rathlin Island across the Straits of Moyle. From Ballycastle the coastline veers southwards around Fair Head and continues with the North Channel and the settlements of Cushendun, then Cushendall and finally Waterfoot.

== Causeway Coast and Glens District Council ==
Causeway Coast and Glens District Council replaced Ballymoney Borough Council, Coleraine Borough Council, Limavady Borough Council and Moyle District Council. The first election for the new district was originally due to take place in May 2009, but on 25 April 2008 Shaun Woodward, Secretary of State for Northern Ireland, announced that the scheduled 2009 district council elections were to be postponed until 2011. The first elections took place on 22 May 2014 and the council acted as a shadow authority until 1 April 2015.

== Settlements ==
=== Towns and villages ===
- Armoy
- Ballintoy
- Ballycastle
- Ballymoney
- Bellarena
- Bushmills
- Castlerock
- Cushendall
- Cushendun
- Coleraine
- Dervock
- Downhill
- Drumsurn
- Dunloy
- Limavady
- Magilligan
- Portballintrae
- Portrush
- Portstewart
- Rasharkin
- Waterfoot

== Freedom of the Borough ==
The following people, military units, organisations and groups have received the Freedom of the Borough of Causeway Coast and Glens.

=== Individuals ===
- Professor Gerry McKenna, biologist, academic administrator: 3 February 2001.
- Alan Campbell: 8 December 2017.
- Richard Chambers: 8 December 2017.
- Peter Chambers: 28 December 2017.
- Mervyn Whyte: 2 February 2018.
- Joan Christie: 11 May 2018.

=== Military Units ===
- 152 (Ulster) Transport Regiment, RLC: 25 October 2008.
- 206 (Ulster) Battery, Royal Artillery (Volunteers): 2015.
- The Royal Air Force: 8 April 2022.

=== Organisations and Groups ===
- Salvation Army and St Vincent de Paul: 2004
- The Royal Portrush Golf Club: 21 May 2021.
- The Northern Health and Social Care Trust: 19 April 2024.

== See also ==
- Local government in Northern Ireland
