= Downhill House =

Mansion in County Londonderry, Northern Ireland

Coordinates: 55°9′51.4″N 6°48′38″W

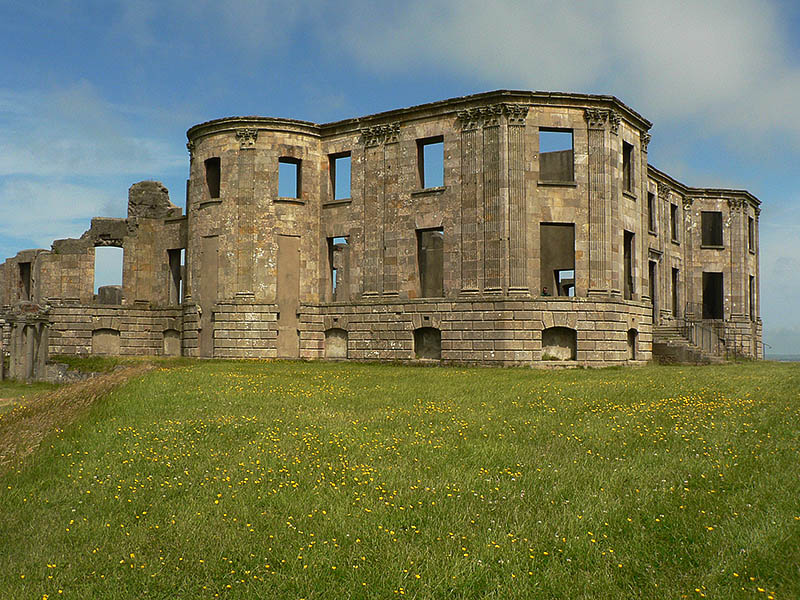
Downhill House ruins in 2006

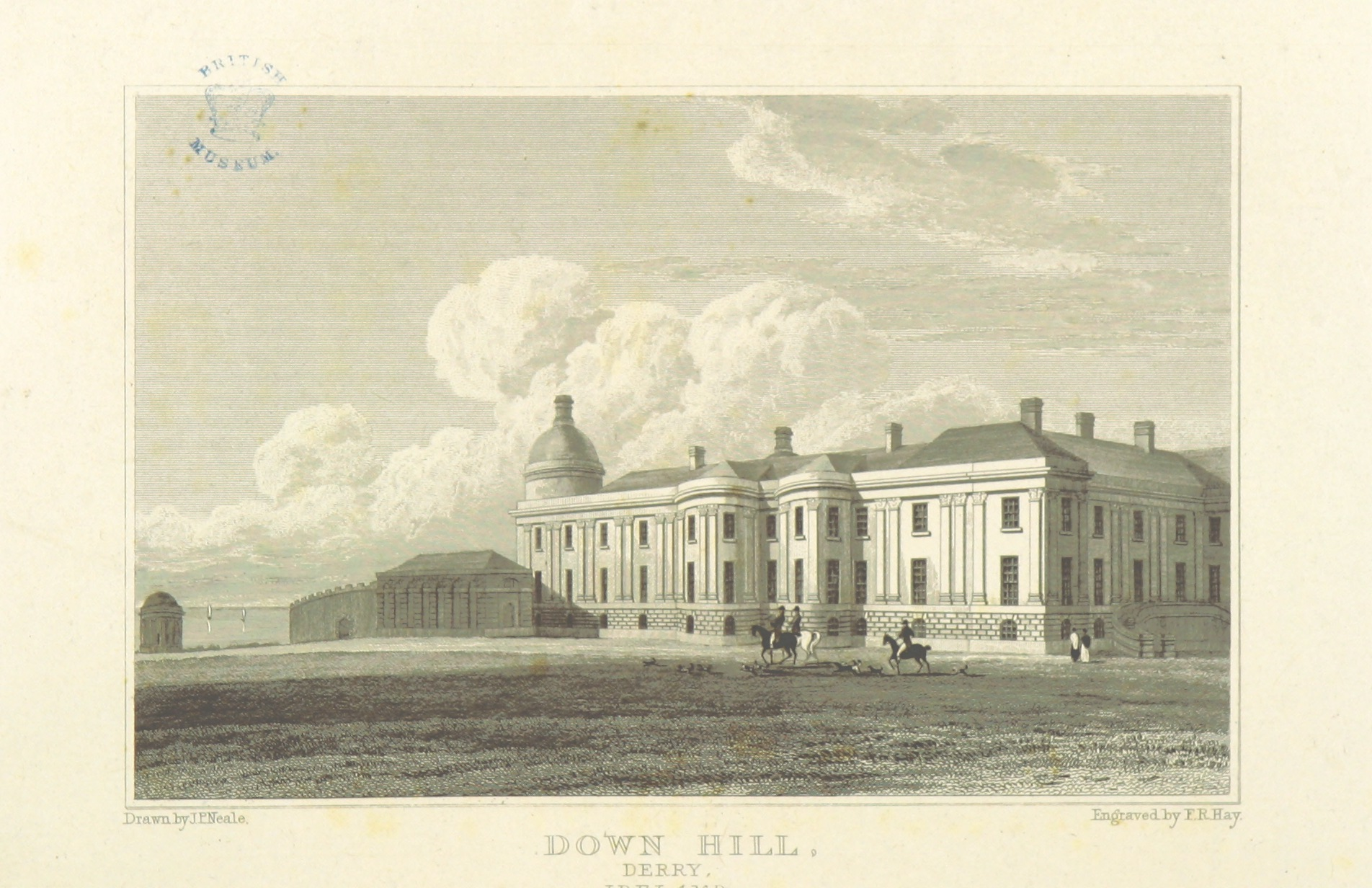
View of Downhill House in 1818 (before the fire and rebuilding)

Downhill House was a mansion built in the late 18th century for Frederick Hervey, 4th Earl of Bristol and Bishop of Derry (popularly known as 'the Earl-Bishop'), at Downhill, County Londonderry. Much of the building was destroyed by fire in 1851 before being rebuilt in the 1870s. It fell into disrepair after the Second World War.

Downhill House is now part of the National Trust property of Downhill Demesne and Mussenden Temple.

== History ==
Frederick Hervey (as he was at the time), Church of Ireland Bishop of Derry, commissioned work at Downhill Demesne near the village of Castlerock in the early 1770s, after he was made the Bishop of Derry in 1768. Downhill House, overlooking Downhill Strand and Benone on the north coast of Northern Ireland, was built by the architect Michael Shanahan, although it has been suggested that James Wyatt or Charles Cameron may also have been involved in the early stages of design. The construction of the House, and the nearby Mussenden Temple, cost an estimated £80,000. The original principal entrance to the demesne was the Lion's Gate, which was actually guarded by two heraldic ounces or snow leopards, the supporters of the Hervey coat of arms. In 1784, this entrance was replaced by the Bishop's Gate. The interior of the house was decorated with frescoes and statues and hung with works by several well-known artists.

After the death in 1803 of Lord Bristol (he had succeeded to the Earldom in December 1779), the estate passed to his cousin, Reverend Henry Bruce, who had acted as steward of the Estate during the Earl-Bishop's absences. Bruce's sister was Frideswide Mussenden, for whom Mussenden Temple was built, and which became a memorial after her death.

Downhill was recorded to have escaped serious damage during the Night of the Big Wind in 1839, but in 1851 a fire damaged a significant part of the house and destroyed the library. Bishop Lord Bristol had amassed a large collection of art, which was kept at Downhill and another residence he built at Ballyscullion. The fire destroyed works by artists including Correggio, Dürer, Murillo, Rubens and Tintoretto, although it was reported that most of the paintings had been saved.

The restoration of the house began in 1870 and continued until 1874 under John Lanyon, the son of architect Charles Lanyon, who maintained many of the original features, although some of the original layout was altered and additions made to the floorplan and decor.

During World War Two, the house was used to billet Royal Air Force servicemen and -women. The Bruce family continued to own the house until 1946; by 1950, it had been dismantled and the surrounding land sold. The house was acquired by the National Trust in 1980; the temple had become a Trust property in the 1940s.

While the location and design of the building has been described as a "spectacular" example of the aesthetic idea of the Sublime, contemporary opinion was not always positive. After a visit in 1801, one visitor wrote of the location:

It is impossible not to regret the misapplication of so much treasure upon a spot where no suitable Desmesne can be created...where the salt spray begins to corrode this sumptuous pile of Grecian Architecture, and the imagination anticipating the distant period weeps over the splendid Ruin, a sad monument of human folly.

while another, Edward Wakefield, said in 1812 that he had, "Never seen so bad a house occupy as much ground."

== Demesne ==
The Demesne also includes a dovecote, walled gardens, a belvedere, or summer house, built for the Earl-Bishop's daughter and a mausoleum dedicated to his brother George Hervey, 2nd Earl of Bristol, Lord Lieutenant of Ireland. The wider estate includes one of Northern Ireland's best-known buildings, the cliff-edge Mussenden Temple.

== Records ==
The Public Record Office of Northern Ireland (P.R.O.N.I.) holds over 1,000 documents relating to the Hervey-Bruce family dating from the mid-18th century to the early 20th century, including detailed information about Downhill.
