= List of tourist attractions in Ireland =

The following list includes the tourist attractions on the island of Ireland which attract more than 100,000 visitors annually. It includes attractions in both Northern Ireland and the Republic of Ireland.

== Multi-county destinations/routes ==
- The Wild Atlantic Way
- Ireland's Ancient East
- Ireland's Hidden Heartlands

== Destinations by county ==
=== A to C ===
- Antrim
  - Antrim Castle and Gardens
  - Carrick-a-Rede Rope Bridge
  - Belfast, capital of Northern Ireland, second largest city on the island
    - Titanic Quarter, including the Titanic Belfast visitor attraction, the SS Nomadic museum ship, and W5 science museum
    - Ulster Museum within the Botanic Gardens
  - Dark Hedges
  - Giant's Causeway, a geological phenomenon and a UNESCO World Heritage Site
  - Lagan Valley Regional Park
  - Old Bushmills Distillery, the oldest Irish whiskey distillery in existence
- Armagh
  - Armagh city, ecclesiastical capital of Ireland and home to St Patrick's Cathedral, Armagh (Church of Ireland) and St Patrick's Cathedral, Armagh (Roman Catholic)
  - Lough Neagh, including Kinnego Marina and Oxford Island National Nature Reserve
  - Lurgan Park
  - Slieve Gullion
- Carlow
  - Altamont House and Gardens
- Clare
  - Bunratty Castle
  - The Burren, a karst landscape which is home to prehistoric monuments such as Poulnabrone dolmen
  - Cliffs of Moher
- Cork
  - Cork City, third largest city in all of Ireland and second city of the Republic of Ireland
    - Blarney, including Blarney Castle the home of the Blarney Stone
    - Church of St Anne (Shandon)
    - Crawford Art Gallery
    - English Market
    - University College Cork campus
  - Doneraile Park
  - Fota Wildlife Park
  - Kinsale
  - Midleton, home of the Old Midleton Distillery, also known as the Jameson Experience, Midleton.

=== D ===
- Donegal
  - Glenveagh National Park, including Glenveagh Castle
  - Malin Head, most northerly point on the mainland of Ireland
  - Slieve League sea cliffs
- Down
  - Crawfordsburn Country Park
  - Dundonald International Ice Bowl, ice rink
  - Irish linen - Thomas Ferguson & Co Ltd, the last remaining Irish linen damask factory
  - Kilbroney Park near Rostrevor at the base of the Mourne Mountains
  - Portstewart Strand
  - Scrabo Tower and Scrabo Country Park
  - Tollymore Forest Park
  - Cathedral of SS Patrick & Colman, Newry
- Dublin City, largest city on the island, capital and cultural and economic centre of the Republic of Ireland
  - Christ Church Cathedral, seat of Anglican Church of Ireland Archbishop of Dublin
  - Chester Beatty Library
  - Croke Park, one of Europe's largest stadiums, with the Museum of the Gaelic Athletic Association
  - Dublin Castle, former seat of British rule, now a major Irish government complex
  - Dublinia, museum and "historical recreation" attraction
  - EPIC The Irish Emigration Museum, diaspora museum
  - General Post Office building, headquarters of the 1916 Easter Rising rebels, on O'Connell Street, the main thoroughfare of Dublin's Northside
  - Glasnevin Cemetery, burial location of Éamon de Valera, Michael Collins, Roger Casement, and many others
  - Grafton Street, one of the main shopping streets in Dublin
  - Guinness Storehouse
  - Ha'penny Bridge, Victorian pedestrian bridge across the River Liffey
  - Hugh Lane Gallery
  - Irish Museum of Modern Art
  - Old Jameson Distillery, Smithfield
  - Kilmainham Gaol, a former prison where, among others, most of the rebels of 1916 were held and executed; now a museum
  - National Aquatic Centre, Blanchardstown
  - National Botanic Gardens, Glasnevin, Dublin (Northside)
  - National Gallery of Ireland, houses the Irish national collection of Irish and European art
  - National Library of Ireland, has a large quantity of Irish historical, literary and Irish-related material
  - National Museum of Ireland for Archaeology (in Kildare St) and Decorative Art and History (in the former Collins Barracks)
  - Phoenix Park, "largest inner city park in the world"; within the park are Farmleigh Estate and Dublin Zoo
  - St Patrick's Cathedral, Dublin, Ireland's "national cathedral"
  - St Stephen's Green, a landscaped inner-city centre public park in Dublin
  - Temple Bar, a mainly cobblestonequarter, directly on the Southern banks of the Liffey, popular for its cultural and nightlife spots
  - Trinity College Dublin (also called the University of Dublin), Ireland's oldest university, home of the Book of Kells and the Book of Durrow
- Dún Laoghaire–Rathdown
  - DLR Lexicon housing a library and cultural centre

=== F to K ===
- Fermanagh
  - Belleek Pottery Visitor Centre
- Fingal
  - Howth and Howth Head
  - Malahide, with the Norman Malahide Castle
- Galway
  - Aran Islands, Gaeltacht islands in Galway Bay which are the location of Dún Aonghasa
  - Connemara, Irish Gaeltacht, a heathland area, including Connemara National Park
  - Galway City, a university city (seat of the NUI Galway)
  - Kylemore Abbey & Gardens
- Kerry, scenic rural county in the south west
  - Dingle, main town of the Dingle Peninsula and home to the Dingle Oceanworld Aquarium
  - Killarney
  - Killarney National Park including Killarney Lakes and Muckross House and Gardens
  - Ring of Kerry, ring road around the Iveragh Peninsula passing through, among others, the village of Cahersiveen, the birthplace of Daniel O'Connell
  - Skellig Islands with the monastic site on Skellig Michael, a UNESCO World Heritage Site
  - Tralee, home of the Rose of Tralee festival and Aqua Dome
- Kildare
  - Castletown House
  - Kildare town with Kildare Cathedral and nearby Irish National Stud & Japanese Gardens
  - Newbridge Silverware visitors centre and "Museum of Style Icons"
- Kilkenny
  - Kilkenny City, a medieval city which is home to St Canice's Cathedral, Rothe House, and Kilkenny Castle

=== L to M ===
- Laois
  - Emo Court and Parklands
  - Rock of Dunamase
- Limerick
  - Adare, "Ireland's most beautiful village" with Adare Manor, Desmond Castle, a Franciscan and a Trinitarian abbey
  - Limerick city, historic Irish city and home to the Munster rugby team, and King John's Castle
- Londonderry
  - City of Derry, only city in Ireland with intact and unbreached city walls (hence sometimes called 'the Maiden City'). The Guildhall, Derry attracted 350,000 visitors in 2017
  - Roe Valley Country Park
- Louth
  - Carlingford, one of Ireland's best preserved mediaeval towns, on the edge of Carlingford Lough
  - Drogheda, formerly Ireland's largest walled town (formed when two separate towns united in 1412); site of Laurence's Gat, Millmount Museum in the castle taken by Cromwell in 1649
- Mayo
  - Croagh Patrick, mountain place of pilgrimage from pagan times to the present day, near Westport
  - Museum of Country Life near Castlebar
- Meath
  - Brú na Bóinne, location of the Knowth, Dowth and Newgrange neolithic tombs and monuments
  - Hill of Tara, seat of Ireland's ancient High Kings
  - Emerald Park, theme park
  - Trim Castle
- Monaghan
  - Harvest Time Blues Festival

=== O to W ===
- Offaly
  - Birr Castle, including its gardens and science centre
  - Clonmacnoise, monastic site on the banks of the River Shannon
- Roscommon
  - Lough Key Lake and forest park
- Sligo
  - Drumcliffe with its church and gravesite of William Butler Yeats, overlooked by Ben Bulben mountain
  - Sligo town with Sligo Abbey
- Tipperary
  - Holy Cross Abbey, a restored Cistercian monastery
  - Rock of Cashel, traditional seat of the Kings of Munster
- Tyrone
  - Dungannon Park
  - Ulster American Folk Park near Omagh
- Waterford
  - Waterford, Ireland's oldest city, home to the Waterford Museum of Treasures (which includes Reginald's Tower and other museum sites, which collectively attracted 100,000 visitors in 2017)
  - Waterford Greenway, a cycling and hiking trail
- Westmeath, centre of Ireland; lakelands
  - Belvedere House and Gardens, historic gardens near Mullingar
- Wexford
  - Ferns Castle and Abbey
  - New Ross and the John F Kennedy Arboretum
- Wicklow, "the garden of Ireland"
  - Glendalough, 6th-century monastic site with Irish round tower
  - Powerscourt Estate, house, grounds and gardens (together with the nearby Powerscourt Waterfall)
  - Russborough House, an example of Irish Palladian architecture, designed by Richard Cassels, built between 1741 and 1755

== See also ==
- Tourism in the Republic of Ireland
- List of Ireland-related topics
- Common Travel Area
- Gardens in the Republic of Ireland
- Parks in the Republic of Ireland
