= Saint Columbs Rill =

River in Northern Ireland

Saint Columb's Rill is a tributary of the much more famous River Bush (An Bhuais in Irish) in Northern Ireland. This 'rill' or rivulet is really a small stream that rises in bog land approximately five miles (eight kilometres) southeast of the village of Bushmills in County Antrim. The rill is named after the patron saint of Derry (Doire in Irish).

== Saint Columba ==
Saint Columba, who had been a distinguished pupil of Saint Finnian at Movilla Monastery in County Down, established a monastic settlement in Derry in 546 AD. In 2013, the city became the European City of Culture and featured a major Saint Columba photographic exhibition, illustrating his on-going impact around the world. Saint Columba was one of the twelve 'Apostles of Ireland' who sailed across the Irish Sea(Muir Éireann in Irish) in 563 AD to begin missionary work in what is now Scotland. Throughout his life, Saint Columba was particularly interested in and connected with the water sources around him.

== Iona ==
The 'Apostles' sailed to the small island of Iona where their landing place became known as St. Columba's bay. Through the mission of Saint Columba, Iona became known as the 'Cradle of Christianity' in Scotland and its historic connection with Ireland was highlighted in a keynote speech by the Irish President Michael D. Higgins when he visited the island on 1 August 2013 to commemorate the 1450th Anniversary of St Columba's arrival. Saint Columba concerned himself with the physical wellbeing of the local people, identifying and recommending suitable sources of water for them to drink. He used these sources of water for therapeutic purposes and it is known that he provided a health advisory service for all of the inhabitants of the island.

== Limestone & Basalt ==
The water forming Saint Columb's Rill, rises through limestone (sedimentary rock) before passing through basalt (igneous rock) on its way to the surface. The water acquires small quantities of the minerals calcium and magnesium and this makes the water slightly hard (alkaline). The rock structure is typical of the geology of County Antrim that was formed by volcanic activity throughout the region in a bygone age. This can be verified by travelling less than thirty miles (fifty kilometres) to the south east. Here, the landscape is dominated by Slemish Mountain which is situated just outside the village of Broughshane (Bruach Sheáin in Irish and pronounced bru-SHAYN). Slemish Mountain has a height of approximately 1500 feet (437 metres) and is actually the dormant plug of an extinct volcano . Today, Slemish Mountain is more famous for being the home of Saint Patrick after he was taken to Ireland as a slave and tasked with tending sheep and pigs around 405 AD.

== Impact of Peatlands ==
As Saint Columb's Rill moves northeast, it flows across acidic Sphagnum peatlands towards the village of Bushmills. In addition to acidity, histosol soils like peat give the water its brown colour and distinctive flavour and this has made Saint Columb's Rill highly prized for brewing and distilling. It is essential that the quality of this Rill is monitored to ensure that it remains unpolluted and this role is carried out by the Northern Ireland Environment Agency. In 2012 a polluting discharge was stopped after being discovered by a Water Quality Inspector and the person responsible faced court action. After harvesting, peat is known as turf and by the late eighteenth century it was the main fuel in Ireland. The lure of special Saint Columb's Rill water combined with an abundant supply of local peat for fuel, resulted in five licensed distilleries being situated in the vicinity of Bushmills. In 2013, just one remains and it stills draws all of its process water from Saint Columb's Rill but it has shifted its energy dependence from turf to natural gas.

== Saint Columb's Rill Reservoir ==
Bushmills Distillery lies directly in the path of Saint Columb's Rill and as the fast moving water approaches, some of it is diverted to form a private reservoir. The capacity of this reservoir is in excess of 10,000 cubic metres (2.2 million gallons) and this will classify it as a "controlled reservoir" under the new Reservoirs Bill for Northern Ireland which is being introduced by the Northern Ireland Assembly in 2014. The remainder of Saint Columb's Rill rushes underneath the Distillery and continues on its journey to join with the River Bush in the village of Bushmills. From there the river discharges into the Atlantic Ocean at Portballintrae, the nearest coastal village to the exposed polygonal basalt columns of the Giant's Causeway which is a World Heritage Site.

== Hard Water becomes Soft Water ==
Saint Columb's Rill supplies all of the process water required by Bushmills Distillery. Mashing is the first process and this requires the water to be heated and mixed with the malted barley grist. Through heating, the water loses its temporary hardness (alkalinity) and becomes soft (acidic). This is because the hydrogen carbonate ions (HCO3–) decompose to form carbonate ions (CO32–) that react with the dissolved calcium to form precipitates of calcium carbonate. In the production of Jim Beam Bourbon, the 'Sour Mash' process is used to add acidity and this process is a requirement for Tennessee Whiskeys such as Jack Daniels but this technique is not required at Bushmills.

All of the whiskeys released by the Old Bushmills Distillery contain Saint Columb's Rill water and this water of life (uisce beatha in Irish) is distributed throughout the world by its parent company Jose Cuervo. Bushmills Whiskey sold 9.6 million bottles in 2012–2013. Bushmills were owned by Diageo until 2015 when they were bought by Jose Cuervo.

== Saint Columb's Rill Relaxation Room ==
The Bushmills Inn is a four star hotel located in the heart of Bushmills Village. In 2013 it opened the Saint Columb's Rill Relaxation Room to provide guests with a range of treatments and homeopathic procedures. Guests can specify the use of water drawn from Saint Columb's Rill for some of these treatments which are aimed at providing spiritual and physical healing. This is in keeping with the practise of Saint Columba more than 1,400 years ago when he concerned himself with the spiritual and physical wellbeing of everyone he ministered to.
