= River Bush =

River in County Antrim, Northern Ireland

Coordinates: 55.21928°N 6.53326°W

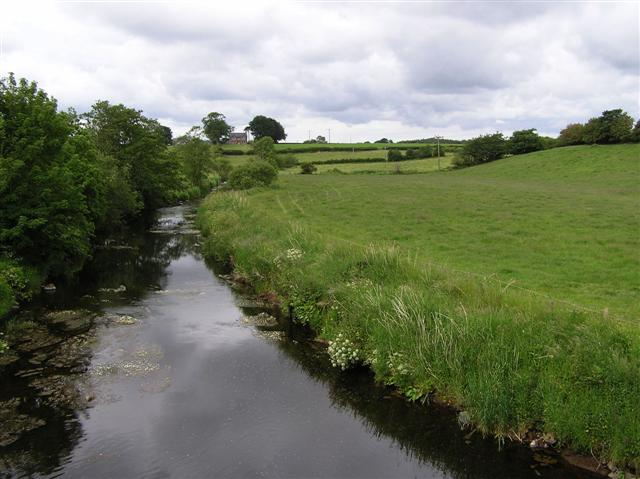
- Etymology: Old Irish búas, "stream, flow, gush" or "abounding in cattle"
- Native name: An Bhuais (Irish)

Location
- Sovereign State: United Kingdom
- Constituent Country: Northern Ireland
- Counties: Antrim
- District: Causeway Coast and Glens
- Cities: Bushmills, Stranocum, Armoy

Physical characteristics
- Source
  - location: Antrim Mountains, Northern Ireland
- Mouth
  - location: Portballintrae, Northern Ireland
- Length: 54 km (34 mi)
- Basin size: 340 km^{2} (130 sq mi)
- Discharge
  - location: Portballintrae

The River Bush (from the Irish: an Bhuais) is a river in County Antrim, Northern Ireland. The River Bush is 33.5 miles (53.9 km) long. The river's source is in the Antrim Hills at 480m. From there the river flows northwest, with a bend at the town of Armoy. It then flows west, passing through Stranocum, and then bends north, passing through Bushmills before reaching the sea at Portballintrae on the North Antrim coast. It flows through a fertile valley devoted to grassland-based agriculture with limited arable cropping. The underlying geology is basalt and the water is slightly alkaline with magnesium making an unusually large contribution to total hardness. The river supports indigenous stocks of Atlantic salmon and brown trout. Saint Columb's Rill, which is a tributary of the river, is the source of water used for distilling Bushmills whiskey.

== Angling ==
The River Bush has traditionally been a salmon-fishing river, though the numbers dwindled in the late 20th and early 21st century. The River Bush still offers excellent salmon fishing. It is managed as a premier salmon river by Department of Culture, Arts and Leisure (DCAL), Inland Fisheries Division.

== See also ==
- List of rivers of Ireland
- Rivers of Ireland
