= Armoy =

Village in County Antrim, Ireland

Coordinates: 55°07′52″N 06°19′36″W

Armoy: Irish: Oirthear Maí; Scots: Aramoy
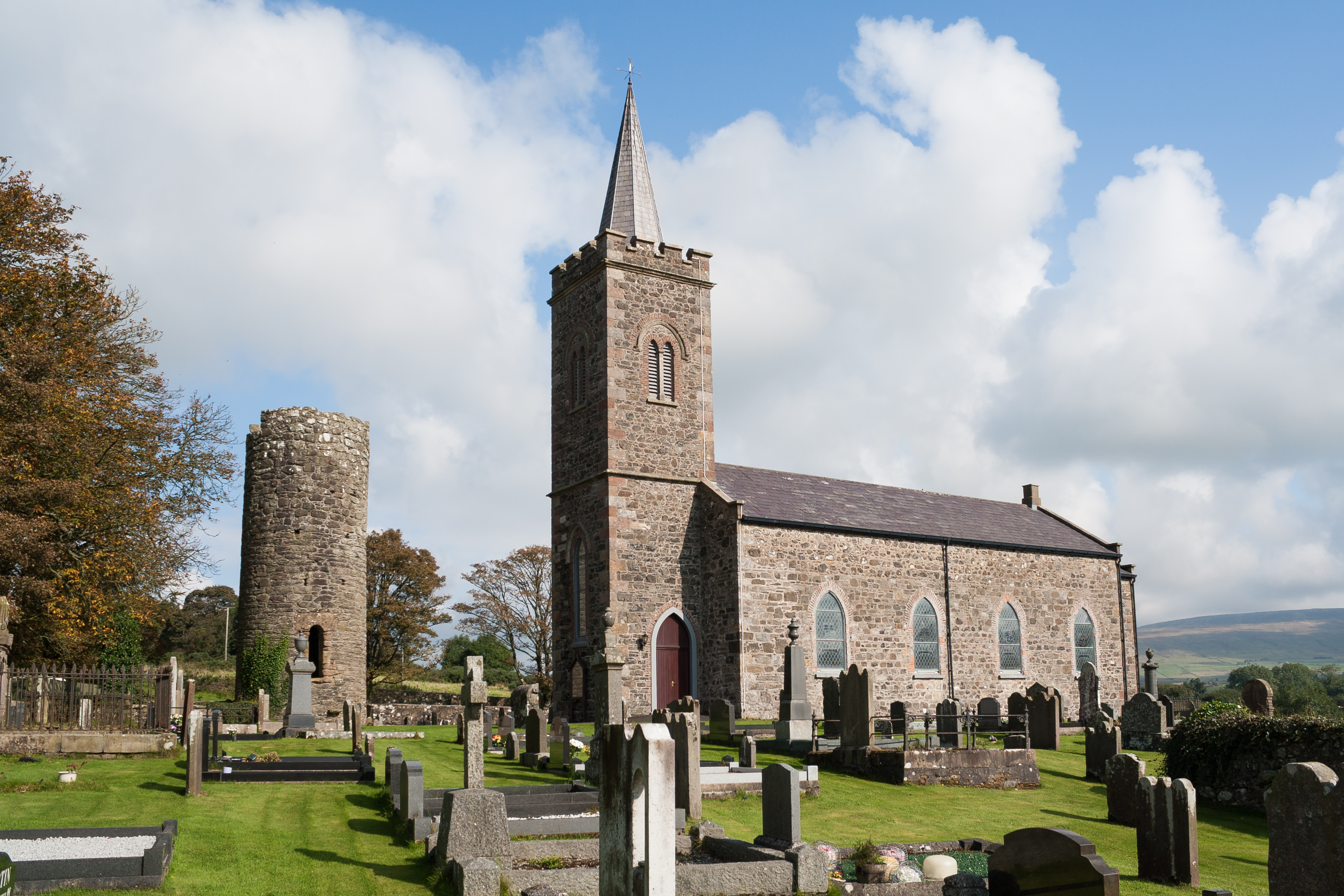
- St Patrick's Church and the round tower, 2014

- Location within Northern Ireland
- Population: 1,122 (2013 Estimate)
- Irish grid reference: D067328
  - Belfast: 49 mi (79 km)
- District: Causeway Coast And Glens
- County: County Antrim
- Country: Northern Ireland
- Sovereign state: United Kingdom
- Post town: BALLYMONEY
- Postcode district: BT53
- Dialling code: 028, +44 28
- UK Parliament: North Antrim
- NI Assembly: North Antrim

Armoy (from Irish Oirthear Maí) is a village and civil parish in County Antrim, Northern Ireland. It is 5.5 miles (9 km) southwest of Ballycastle and 8 miles (13 km) northeast of Ballymoney. According to an estimate in 2013 by the Northern Ireland Statistics and Research Agency it had a population of 1,122.

The village is centred on the River Bush and at the foot of two of the nine Glens of Antrim; Glenshesk and Glentaisie. The Armoy parish also includes part of Knocklayd mountain which lies to the northeast of the village.

It is one of the bigger villages in the area and has two primary schools, shops, a post office, public houses and other community facilities. The village was dominated by public sector housing for many years, but in the late 1980s and early 1990s, new housing developments began around the village.

The village is close to a number of scenic locations including the Dark Hedges, which in recent years has become a popular tourist attraction as the infamous "King's Road" in the HBO series Game of Thrones.

== History ==
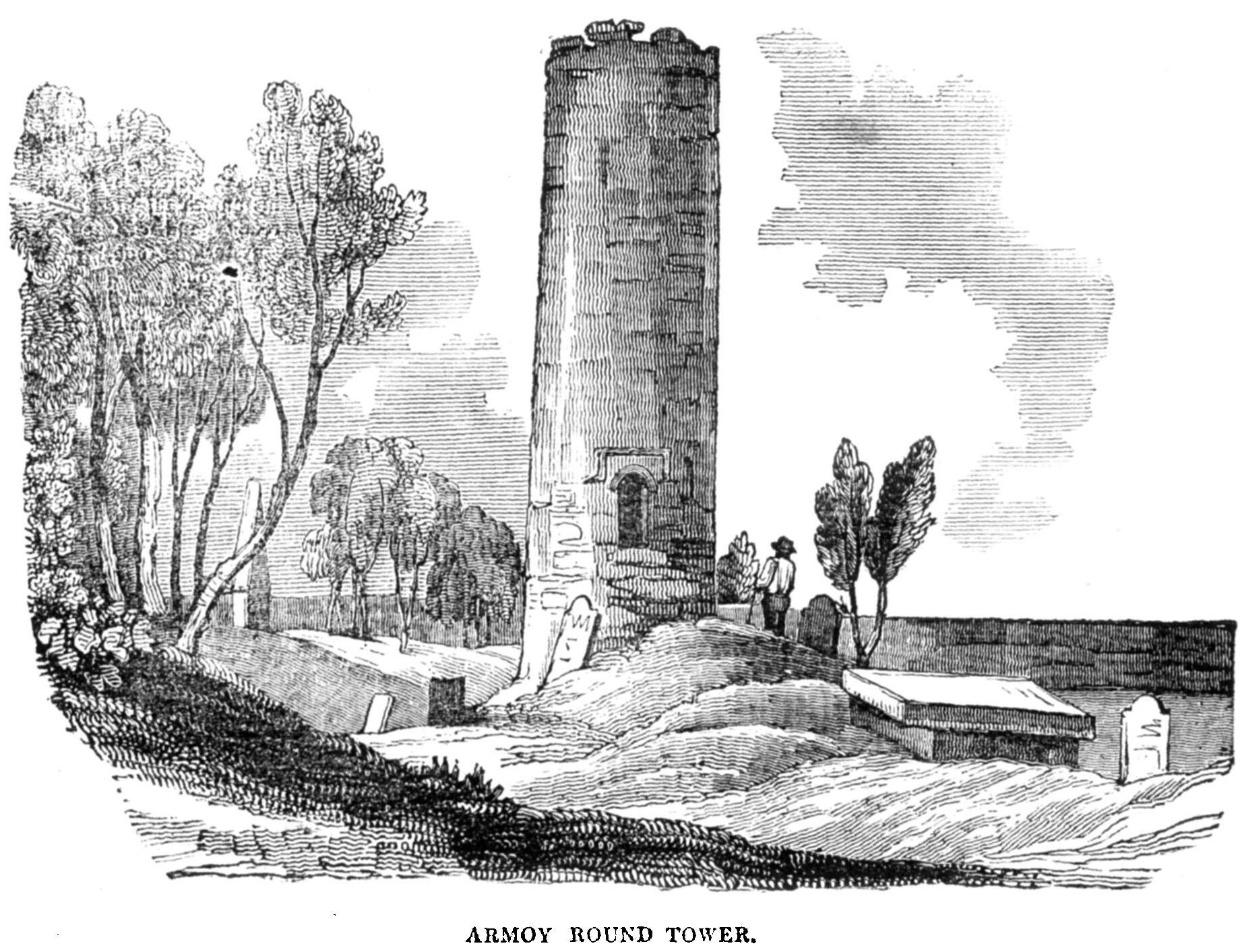
Armoy Round Tower, Dublin Penny Journal, 1834

A monastic settlement which was founded by Saint Patrick in the 5th Century formerly sat to the northeast of the present day village, in the area of what is now St. Patrick's Parish Church. The site was excavated in recent years and archaeologists uncovered artifacts which date the location to the 6th century. The actual centre of the monastic settlement has yet to be determined, though many scholars believe it may be higher up the slope behind the graveyard on unexcavated ground.

The monastic settlement is said to be built on land given to Patrick by Fergus Mor MacEarca who would succeed his father to become the first Christian king in Ireland. Saint Olcán was a follower of Patrick who came from the area, and was baptised at Dunseverick by Patrick and later became Bishop of Armoy. One of the local primary schools still carries his name.

It is suggested that the original site of the village was built around the monastery and the round tower. However, the village moved to its present-day location on the banks of the River Bush to accommodate the local mills which demanded large volumes of water. Therefore, a location by the riverbank was much more suitable.

The area surrounding the present day church is of special significance as it has several oval shaped tunnels which have been dug under the rock all the way down to a cave at the Lagge crossroads below the church. This tunnel from the tower to the crossroads was used as an escape route as it leads down to the River Bush. The word Lagge is of significance as it translates as hollow and legend has it that a giant lifted an 'L'- shaped section of the ground at Lagge Cross and threw it into the sea creating Rathlin Island.

=== The Troubles ===
On 15 April 1978, RUC officer John Moore was killed by an IRA booby trap bomb attached to his car.

== Places of interest ==
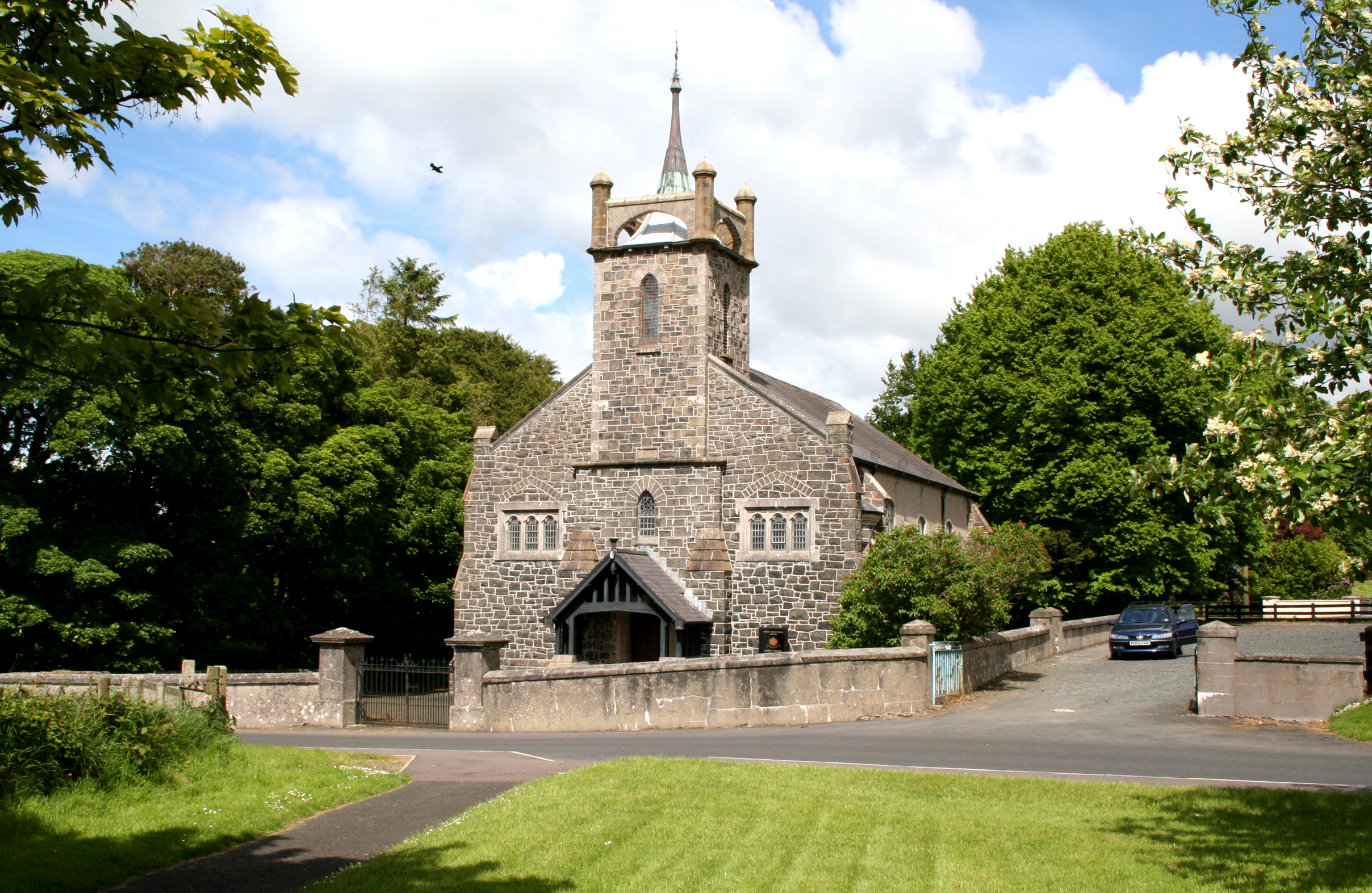
Armoy Presbyterian Church

- A Presbyterian church sits near the River Bush and close to the centre on the village. The church's spire, with a Viking ship weathervane on top, has been described as "a miniature replica of the Eiffel Tower".
- There are the remains of an Irish round tower on the edge of the village. An early monastery was founded about AD 460 by Saint Olcán, a disciple of Saint Patrick. The only trace of an early monastery is the stump of the round tower, which stands in the grounds of St Patrick's Parish Church. The tower is about 11 m high and has three storeys. At one time, Armoy was the main religious settlement in the Irish part of the kingdom of Dál Riata.
- Close to the village is Gracehill House, a Georgian house dating from 1775. The grounds are home to Gracehill Golf Course, an 18-hole parkland golf course which is surrounded by ponds and woodland.
- The village also has a small park beside the river in which many references can be found to its connection with motorbikes and road racing. This includes a monument dedicated to the "Armoy Armada" who were a group of road racers from Armoy which included Joey Dunlop, Mervyn Robinson, Frank Kennedy and Jim Dunlop. The park also has paths laid out in the shape of the circuits of both the North West 200 and the Isle of Man TT.

== Events ==
In recent years, Armoy has played host to the Armoy Road Race, also known as "The Race of Legends".

The event was first ran in 2009 and usually takes place at the end of July/start of August every year. The track itself is 3 mile long circuit made up of public roads and runs through a part of the village. The grid for the races is set up in a grand prix style with up to 27 riders starting each race. The start/finish line is located along the A44 Hillside Road just to the north of the village on the main road to Ballycastle.

=== Armoy Armada ===
In the late 1970s, a quartet of successful motorcycle racers from Armoy was known as the "Armoy Armada". Frank Kennedy, Mervyn Robinson, Joey Dunlop and Jim Dunlop, became household names in Ulster. In 2020, the Armoy Armada was commemorated by a mural in the village, painted by West Belfast artist Oliver McParland.

== Geography ==
Armoy is situated in the Glens of Antrim, an area known for its valleys shaped by glaciers during the ice age. The Armoy Moraine is located on the outskirts of the village in an area known locally as The Lagge, where the Round Tower and St. Patrick's Church now sit. Deposited here as a result of the last glacial event in Ulster it deflected the River Bush to west, blocking its previous path northwards to the sea at Ballycastle. Today the River Bush now flows west through the village, towards Stranocum and eventually reaches the sea through Bushmills and Portballintrae.

== Transport ==
Armoy railway station opened on 18 October 1880 and was shut on 3 July 1950. It was on the Ballycastle Railway, a narrow gauge railway which ran for 17 miles linking Ballycastle to Ballymoney, on the Belfast and Northern Counties Railway (BNCR), later Northern Counties Committee (NCC), main line to Derry~Londonderry.

== Notable people ==
- Olcán, 5th century saint
- Olcan McFetridge was a famous County Antrim hurler. He received an all-star award in 1989 and won a Sports Council Merit and Sunday Life Award in August 2005.
- Joey Dunlop OBE was a resident of Armoy and was a member of the Armoy Armada. He was a world champion motorcyclist.
- Hannah Craig, Olympic slalom canoer, former resident at Lime Park, Armoy, and past pupil of Armoy Primary School.
- Stephen Hunter McCooke (4 September 1918 – 16 March 2007) was a British and Northern Irish long-distance runner who competed at the 1948 Summer Olympics.

Along with his brother Charlie, they broke almost every long distance running record in Ireland.

== See also ==
- List of civil parishes of County Antrim
