= Dark Hedges =

Avenue of trees in County Antrim, Northern Ireland

Coordinates: 55.1344°N 6.3806°W

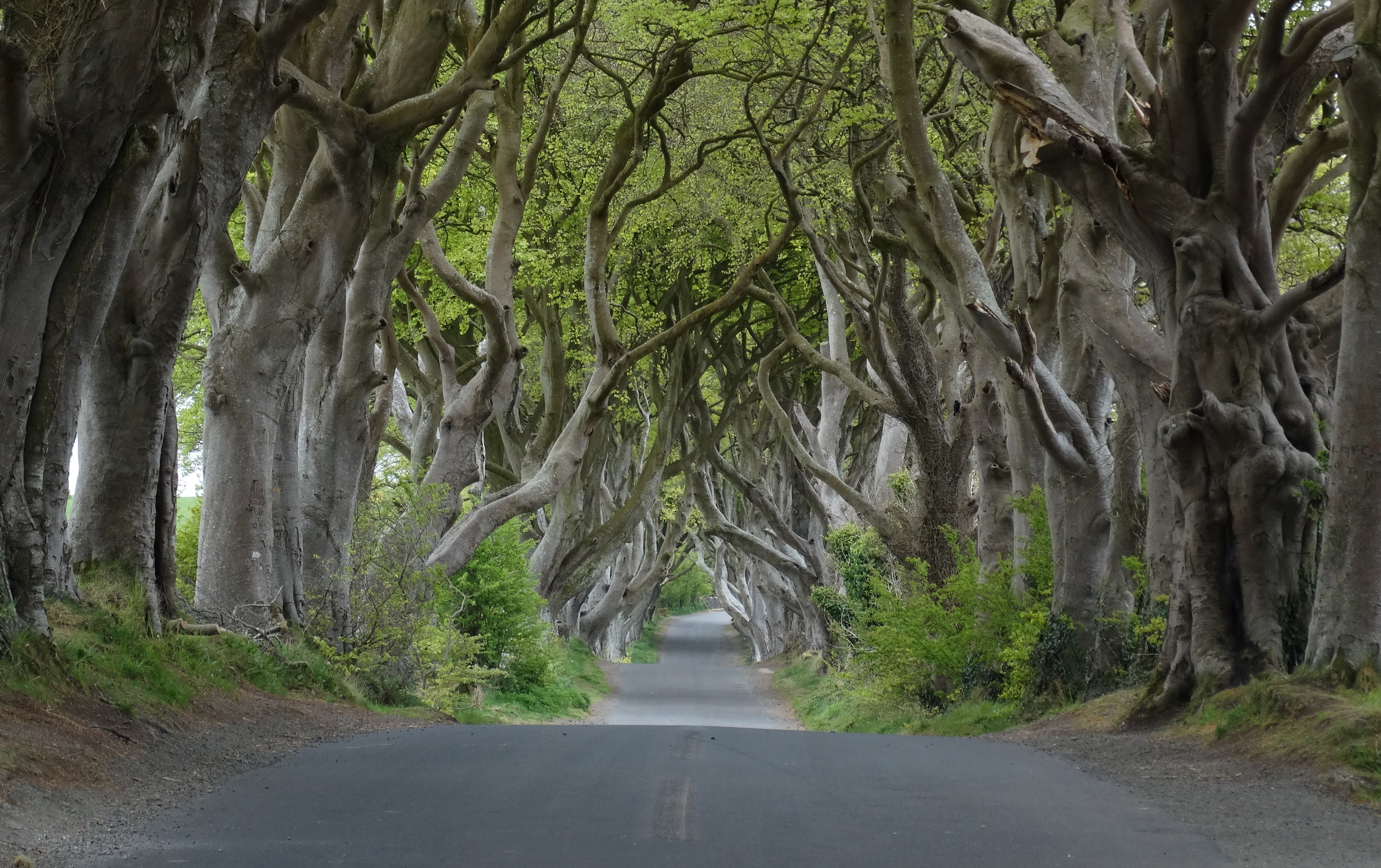
The Dark Hedges, May 2016

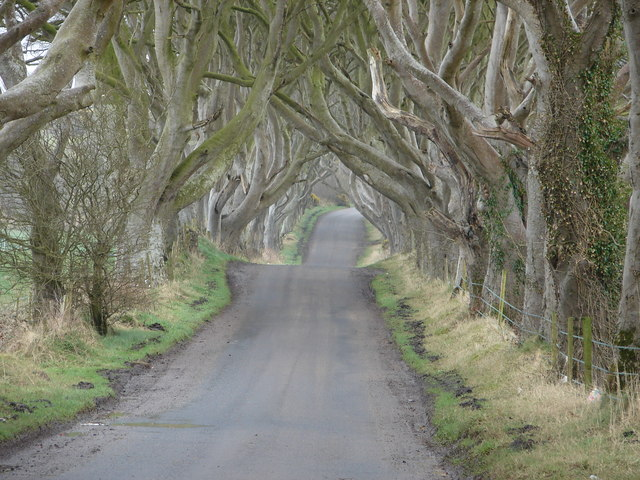
The former carriage road looking South-East, March 2006

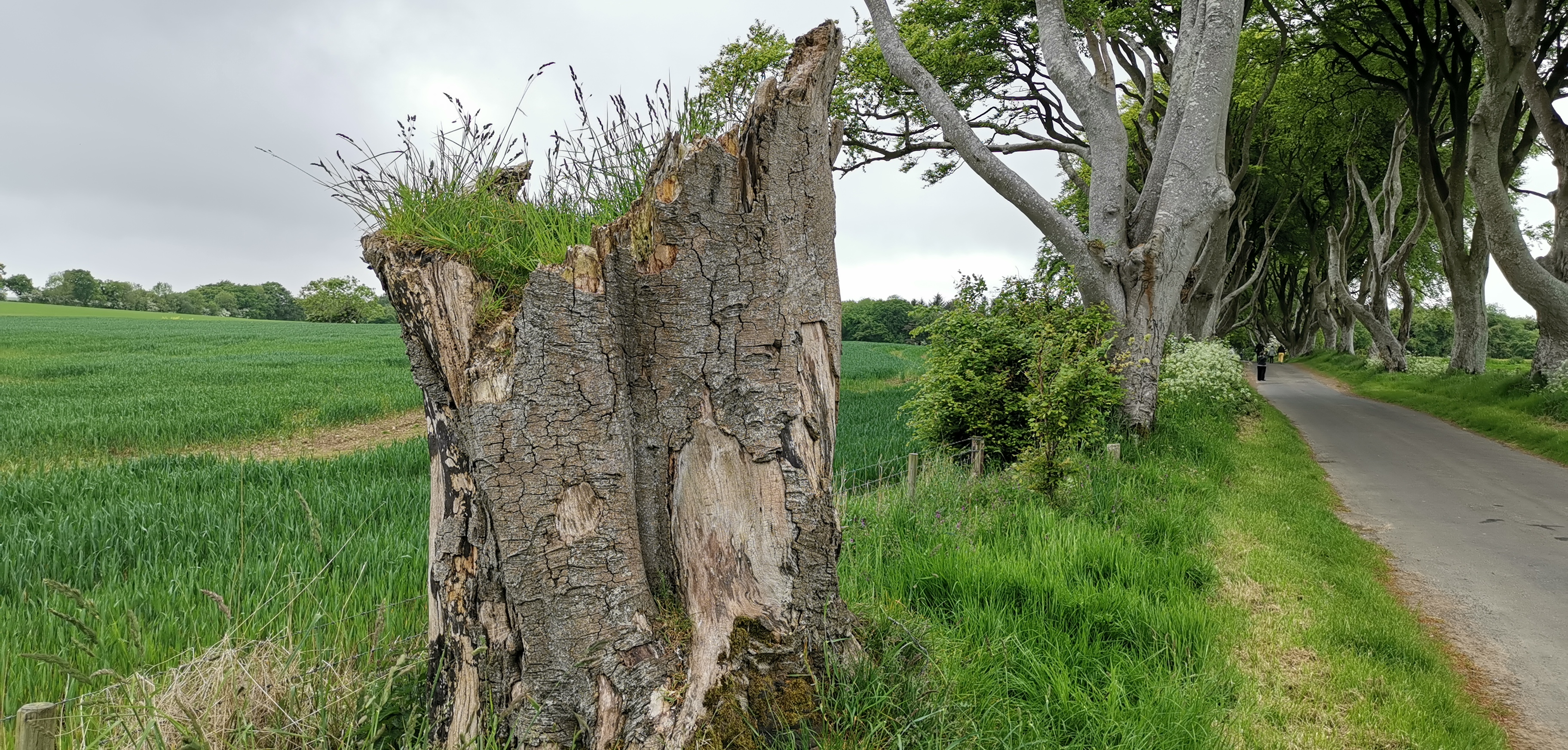
One of the tree stumps, May 2023

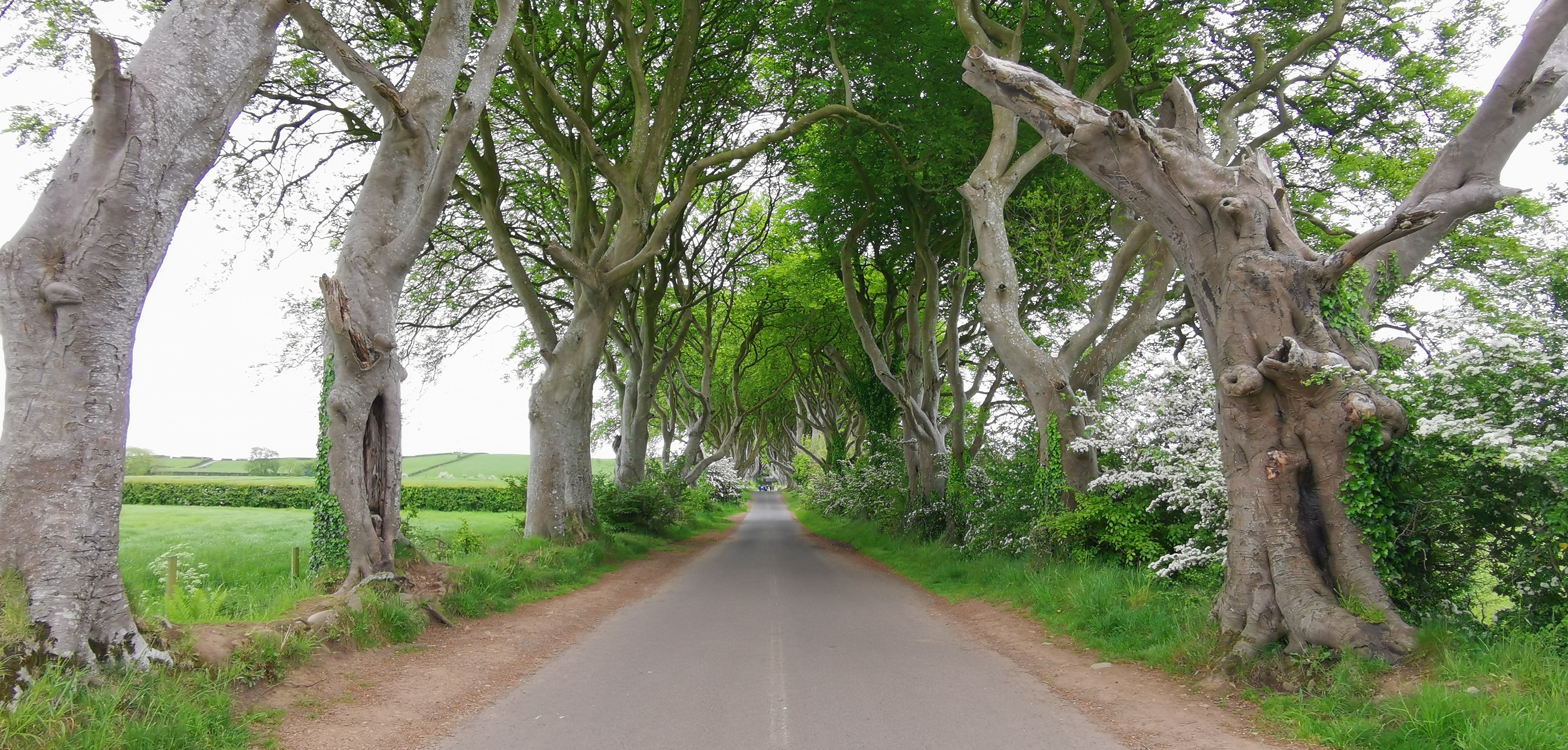
Condition of individual beech trunks, May 2023

The Dark Hedges (Irish: Na Fálta Dorcha) is an carriage avenue of mature beech trees along Bregagh Road between Armoy and Stranocum in County Antrim, Northern Ireland. The trees on both sides of the road are European beech trees (Fagus sylvatica), which are not indigenous to Ireland, they meet overhead, growing into a twisted canopy and forming a tree tunnel that is between 6 and 10 metres in width – the avenue is about 150 metres. The Dark Hedges are one of Northern Ireland's most photographed attraction, in the 1990s Northern Ireland started using images from the carriage road in their tourism campaigns. Planted around 1775, the iconic beech trees are roughly 250 years old, surpassing the typical 150-to-200-year life expectancy of common beech trees. The trees are in a state of natural decline and near the end of their lifespan. The tunnel of beech trees shot to international fame when they were filmed on location in the US TV drama Game of Thrones (2011). The Bregagh Road was permanently pedestrianised and closed to general public vehicle traffic since October 2017 to protect the sensitive root systems from vehicle compaction. Around 75 of the original 150 trees remain as of 2026.

== Origin ==
In about 1775, James Stuart built a new house, named Gracehill House after his wife Grace Lynd. Over 150 beech trees were planted along the entrance road to the estate, once a carriage road, to create an imposing approach.

== Legend ==
According to legend, the hedges are visited by a ghost called the Grey Lady, who travels the road and flits across it from tree to tree. She is claimed to be either the spirit of James Stuart's daughter (named "Cross Peggy") or one of the house's maids who died mysteriously, or a spirit from an abandoned graveyard beneath the fields, who on Halloween is joined on her visitation by other spirits from the graveyard.

== Filming location ==
The Dark Hedges was used as a filming location for the "King's Road" in the television series Game of Thrones. The trees were also used in the 2017 Transformers film The Last Knight.

== Status and conservation ==
A tree preservation order was placed on the trees in 2004, to enable preservation and maintenance, and in 2009 the Dark Hedges Preservation Trust was set up. Of the 150 trees originally planted by the Stuart family, about 90 remained by 2016. A survey in 2014 revealed that the trees are in various states of health and are at risk in bad weather. Two trees were destroyed, and one damaged, by Storm Gertrude in January 2016. Another tree came down in Storm Doris in February 2017. A tree toppled during Storm Hector in June 2018. Another came down during strong winds in January 2019. Two more trees were toppled during Storm Arwen on Saturday 27 November 2021. Three trees were felled as a result of Storm Isha in January 2024, and a further two during Storm Eowyn, on Friday 24 January 2025, raising further concerns about the preservation of the remaining trees.

As visitor numbers have increased, concern has been expressed over vehicular traffic damaging the trees' roots, as well as problems of graffiti and the daubing of sectarian slogans on the trees. The Woodland Trust has stated that high traffic levels might cause the trees, which are surface rooting, to last less than twenty years. In 2017 the Department of Infrastructure announced plans to close the road to traffic, due to visitor numbers causing possible damage and degradation to the site. A ban on traffic using the road (between its junctions with Ballinlea Road and Ballykenver Road) came into place on 30 October 2017. Specified exemptions to the ban include emergency and agricultural vehicles in particular circumstances. In 2023, a survey found that 11 of the remaining 86 trees were in a poor condition and could pose a danger to the public, and 6 of them were to be felled.

== See also ==
- List of tourist attractions in Ireland
