= Old Bushmills Distillery =

Distillery in Northern Ireland

Coordinates: 55.201919°N 6.519648°W

- Founded: 1784, Kingdom of Ireland
- Headquarters: Bushmills, County Antrim, Northern Ireland
- Products: Irish whiskey
- Parent: Proximo Spirits
- Website: bushmills.com

The Old Bushmills Distillery is an Irish whiskey distillery in Bushmills, County Antrim, Northern Ireland, established in 1784 and owned by Proximo Spirits. Bushmills Distillery uses water drawn from Saint Columb's Rill, which is a tributary of the River Bush. The distillery is a popular tourist attraction, with around 120,000 visitors per year. It produces the Bushmills brand of Irish whiskey.

The company that originally built the distillery was formed in 1784, although the date 1608 is printed on the label of the brand – referring to an earlier date when a royal licence was granted to a local landowner to distil whiskey in the area. After various periods of closure in its subsequent history, the distillery has been in approximately continuous operation since it was rebuilt after a fire in 1885.

== History ==
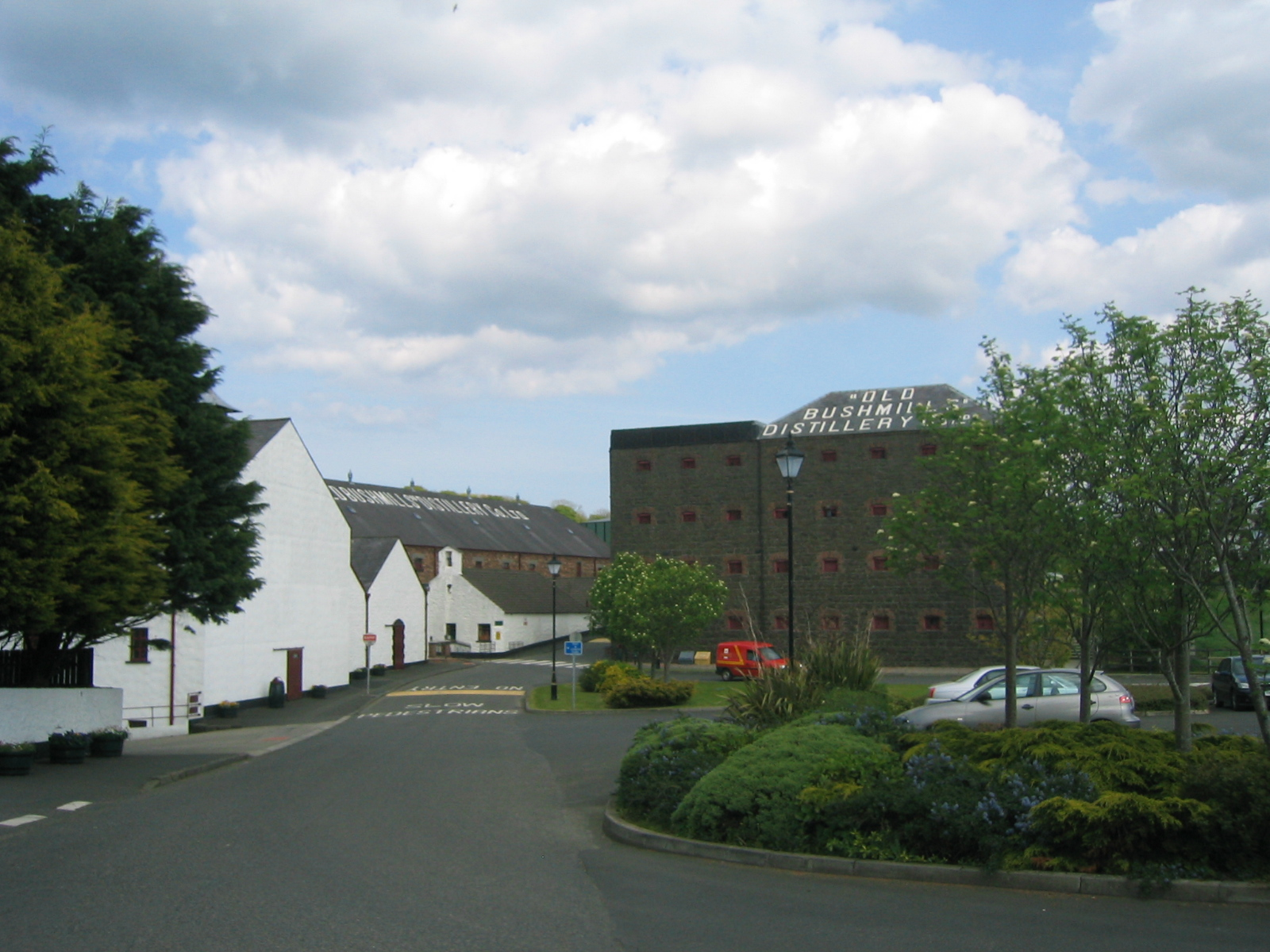
The distillery in County Antrim.

The area has a long tradition with distillation. According to one story, as far back as 1276, an early settler called Sir Robert Savage of Ards, before defeating the Irish in battle, fortified his troops with "a mighty drop of acqua vitae". In 1608, a licence was granted to Sir Thomas Phillips by King James I to distil whiskey.

for the next seven years, within the countie of Colrane, otherwise called O Cahanes countrey, or within the territorie called Rowte, in Co. Antrim, by himselfe or his servauntes, to make, drawe, and distil such and soe great quantities of aquavite, usquabagh and aqua composita, as he or his assignes shall thinke fitt; and the same to sell, vent, and dispose of to any persons, yeeldinge yerelie the somme 13s 4d ...

The Bushmills Old Distillery Company itself was not established until 1784 by Hugh Anderson. Bushmills suffered many lean years with numerous periods of closure with no record of the distillery being in operation in the official records both in 1802 and in 1822. In 1860 a Belfast spirit merchant named Jame McColgan and Patrick Corrigan bought the distillery; in 1880 they formed a limited company. In 1885, the original Bushmills buildings were destroyed by fire but the distillery was swiftly rebuilt. In 1890, a steamship owned and operated by the distillery, SS Bushmills, made its maiden voyage across the Atlantic to deliver Bushmills whiskey to America. It called at Philadelphia and New York City before heading on to Singapore, Hong Kong, Shanghai and Yokohama.

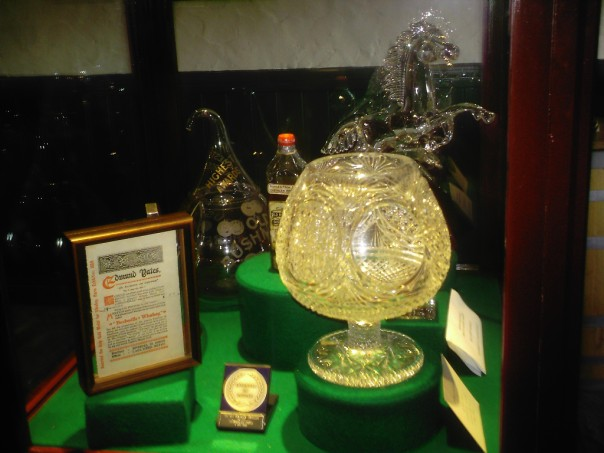
A showcase at the distillery

In the early 20th century, the U.S. was a very important market for Bushmills (and other Irish Whiskey producers). American Prohibition in 1920 came as a large blow to the Irish Whiskey industry, but Bushmills managed to survive. Wilson Boyd, Bushmills' director at the time, predicted the end of prohibition and had large stores of whiskey ready to export. After the Second World War, the distillery was bought by Isaac Wolfson, and, in 1972, it was taken over by Irish Distillers, meaning that Irish Distillers controlled the production of all Irish whiskey at the time. In June 1988, Irish Distillers was bought by French liquor group Pernod Ricard.

In June 2005, the distillery was bought by Diageo for £200 million. Diageo has also announced a large advertising campaign in order to regain a market share for Bushmills.

In May 2008, the Bank of Ireland issued a new series of sterling banknotes in Northern Ireland which all feature an illustration of the Old Bushmills Distillery on the obverse side, replacing the previous notes series which depicted Queen's University of Belfast.

In November 2014 it was announced that Diageo had traded the Bushmills brand with Proximo Spirits in exchange for the 50% of the Don Julio brand of tequila that Diageo did not already own.

In April 2023, Bushmills opened its second distillery, the Causeway Distillery, located next to the existing distillery. The addition means that Bushmills’ annual production capacity will increase from five million litres of alcohol per annum to 11m litres.

== Current whiskey range ==
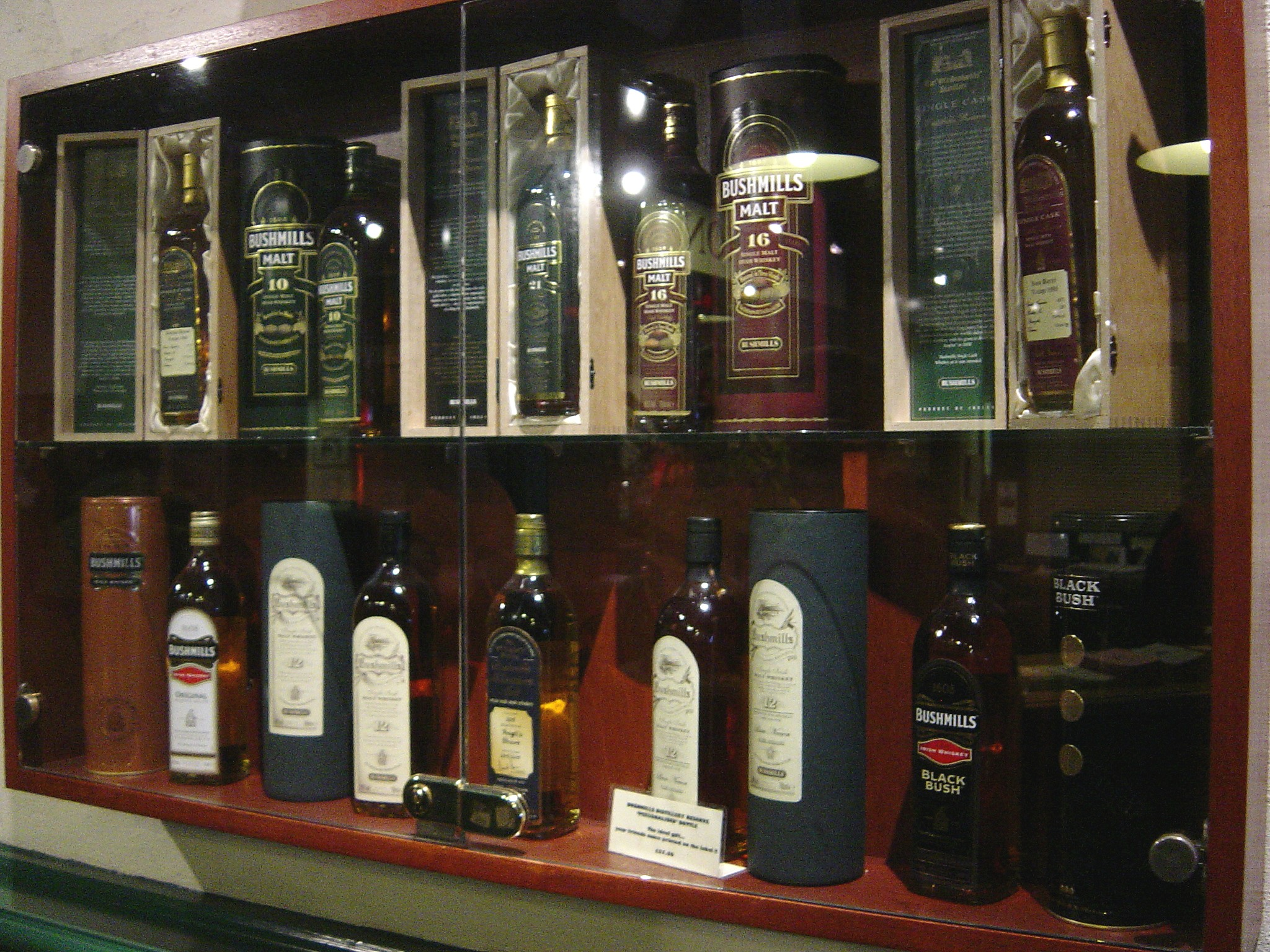
Bushmills whiskey range on display at the distillery

- Bushmills Original – Irish whiskey blend sometimes called White Bush or Bushmills White Label. The grain whiskey is matured in American oak casks.
- Black Bush – A blend with a significantly greater proportion of malt whiskey than the white label. It features malt whiskey aged in casks previously used for Spanish Oloroso sherry.

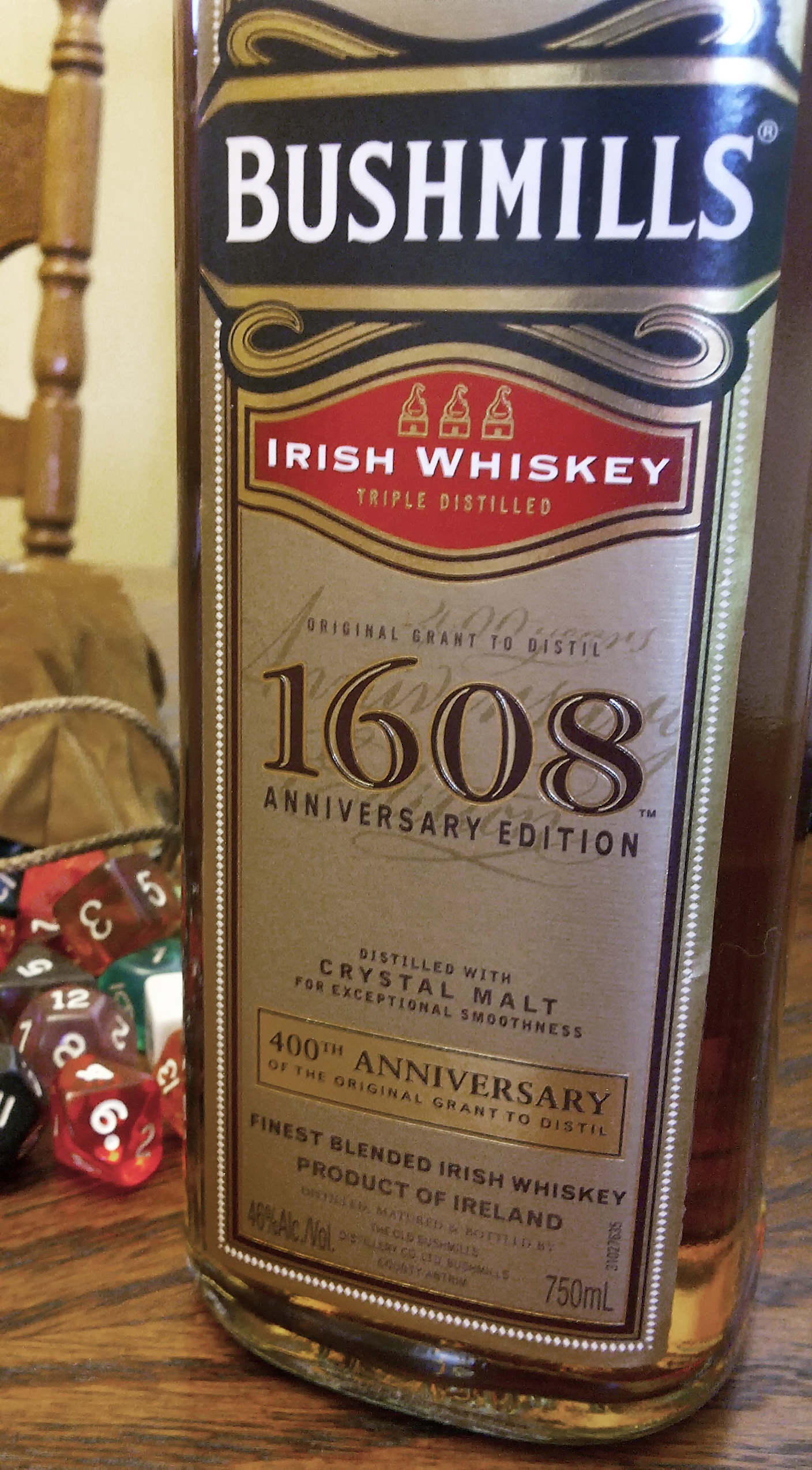
The Bush 1608

- Red Bush – Like the Black Bush, this is a blend with a higher proportion of malt whiskey than the standard bottling, but in contrast, the malt whiskey has been matured in ex-bourbon casks.
- Bushmills 10-year single malt – Combines malt whiskeys aged at least 10 years in former Sherry and American bourbon casks.
- Bushmills 12-year single malt – Malt whiskeys aged for at least 12 years in Spanish Oloroso sherry and American bourbon barrels are blended together before finishing in Marsala wine casks for 6 to 9 months.
- Bushmills Distillery Reserve 12-year single malt – exclusively available at the Old Bushmills Distillery, this 12-year aged single malt is matured in oak casks for a rich, complex flavour with notes of sherry, dark chocolate and spices.
- Bushmills 16-year single malt – Malt whiskeys aged at least 16 years in American bourbon barrels or Spanish Oloroso sherry butts are mixed together before finishing in Port wine pipes for about 9 months.
- Bushmills 21-year single malt – A limited number of 21-year bottles are made each year. After 19 years in Oloroso Sherry and bourbon-seasoned casks the malt whiskeys are combined and followed by two years of finishing in Madeira wine casks.
- Bushmills 1608: Originally released as a special 400th Anniversary whiskey; since 2009 it has been available only in the Whiskey Shop at the distillery and at duty-free shops.

== Critical acclaim ==
Some Bushmills offerings have performed well at international spirit ratings competitions. In particular, its Black Bush Finest Blended Whiskey received double gold medals at the 2007 and 2010 San Francisco World Spirits Competition. It also received a well-above-average score of 93 from the Beverage Testing Institute in 2008 and 2011.

== In popular culture ==
- Before attaining relative sobriety in the early 2000s, Ministry frontman Al Jourgensen was a heavy drinker of Bushmills, consuming as much as two full bottles per day.
- The band NOFX mentions Bushmills in the song "Theme from a NOFX Album" on the 2000 release Pump Up the Valuum.
- Tom Waits mentions 'Old Bushmills' in the song "Tom Traubert's Blues" (which was also covered by Rod Stewart).
- In the third-season episode of The Wire, "Back Burners", Jimmy McNulty refers to Bushmills as "Protestant whiskey" when he is offered it after being told Jameson is unavailable.
- Burt Reynolds plays a police lieutenant in the 1975 film Hustle whose favourite drink is Bushmills.
- Todd Rundgren cites "a half a pint of Bushmills" as a poor substitute for love in his song "Hungry for Love" from the 1973 album A Wizard, a True Star.
- Paul Freeman's character Colin orders two Bushmills at a Belfast pub in the 1980 film The Long Good Friday.
- In the 1982 film The Verdict, the Paul Newman character Frank Galvin orders Bushmills and water at his neighbourhood pub.
- In Rescue Me the series, seasons 1–7, Bushmills is the common whiskey shared and favourited among the entire Irish Gavin Family and referred to in at least ten episodes.
- In Jackie Brown, a bottle of Bushmills is visible in scenes in Max's office and is referenced in the script.
- In Independence Day, Jeff Goldblum's character is seen drinking a bottle of Bushmills, lamenting the end of the world.
- In Better Call Saul Season 4, Episode 6 "Piñata", Howard suggests to Chuck McGill to join him in his office, where a Mr. Bushmills is waiting for him - an apparently workplace correct reference to celebrate a recent lawsuit win in a difficult case by Chuck for the law firm.
- In The Eagle Has Landed, the character of Liam Devlin expresses a fondness for Bushmills whiskey.
- In The Sting, Robert Redford's character can be seen drinking Bushmills whiskey before the final con.
- During the movie The Lawnmower Man, Pierce Brosnan's character pours himself a glass of Bushmills Whiskey with a tricolour of the Republic of Ireland seen in the background.
- In Take the High Road, gamekeeper Davie Sneddon (played by Derek Lord) is a regular customer at the Ardnacraig Bar, where he always requests "a large Bush".

== See also ==
- List of whiskey brands § Irish whiskey
- List of historic whiskey distilleries
- List of tourist attractions in Ireland
