= Mussenden Temple and Downhill Demesne =

Heritage property in Northern Ireland

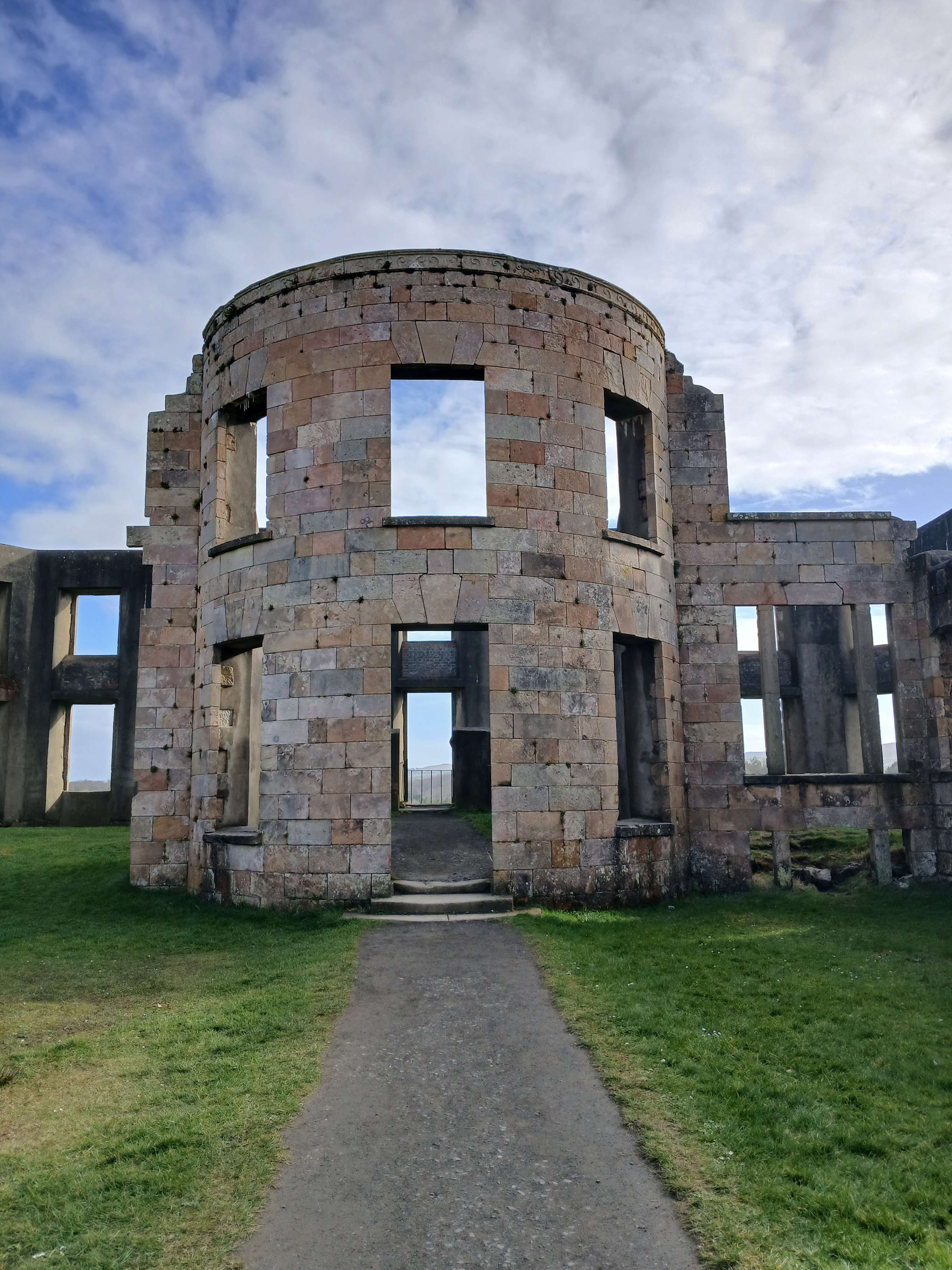
- Location: National Trust property, County Londonderry, Northern Ireland

The Mussenden Temple and Downhill Demesne is a National Trust property consisting of Downhill Castle and its estate, which includes the Mussenden Temple. The property is a common wedding destination and viewing point.

== See also ==
- Hezlett House
