= Hezlett House =

Historic cottage in Northern Ireland

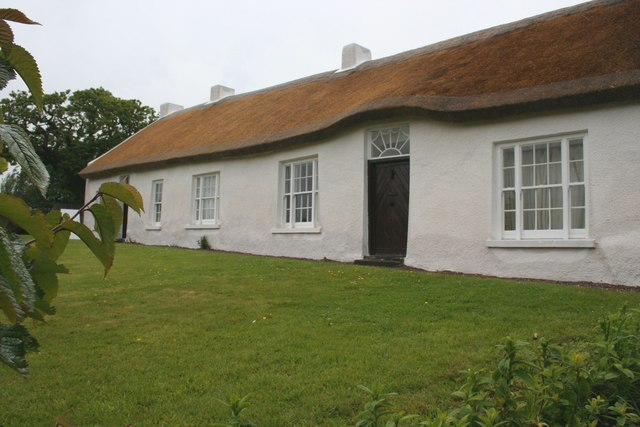

- Location within Northern Ireland
- Alternative names: Liffock House

General information
- Location: Castlerock, Northern Ireland
- Coordinates: 55.155°N 6.7899°W
- Completed: 1691
- Owner: National Trust for Places of Historic Interest or Natural Beauty

Hezlett House is a 17th-century thatched cottage located in Castlerock, County Londonderry, Northern Ireland. Built around 1691, it is one of the oldest buildings still in use anywhere in Ulster. The cottage has a cruck structure and is situated at the crossroads near the village. It was originally a rectory or farmhouse.

== See also ==
- Downhill Estate
