= Thomas Ferguson & Co Ltd =

Irish linen Jacquard weaver

Thomas Ferguson Irish Linen is the last remaining of the old established Irish linen Jacquard weavers in Ireland. Situated in Banbridge, Northern Ireland it has been weaving since 1854. The Company, bears the name of its founder, Thomas Ferguson (1820–1900), who was born at Clare, near the village of Waringstown in County Down.

They are almost exclusively weavers of linen fabrics, made from yarns spun from 100% flax fibre. These fabrics are made up into luxury household linens and gifts, such as napery, bed linen, traditional lettered tea towels, etc., by Thomas Ferguson and others who purchase their fabrics.

In early 2012 Thomas Ferguson developed a range of exclusive apparel fabrics. Most were made from Irish linen, but some were wool.

Thomas Ferguson & Co Ltd were always one of the smaller, but more specialist, Irish linen weavers. They specialised in finer linens, and bespoke weaving, sometimes of only one custom sized tablecloth, or the weaving-in of the customers own family crest, company logo or special design. They set up their weaving plant to allow them to commercially deal with this type of small order, whilst the larger companies produced volume and went for big hotel contracts, or the like. The top end, and custom work, that Thomas Ferguson's specialised in became more what individual customers wanted as the industry came under more and more pressure from low cost countries. Larger contracts were squeezed out to the low cost producers, but the quality custom work that Ferguson's concentrated on largely remained as this involved smaller orders and generally 'fell under the radar' of the larger producers in the low cost countries.

They are a member of the Irish Linen Guild, and European Masters of Linen.

Since 1988 it has been part of the Franklins Group of companies. Since that time the Ferguson family has no longer been involved in the business. In 2020 Franklins Group came under the control of the Neilly family.

In 2012 John England (Banbridge) Ltd was brought under the same ownership as Thomas Ferguson. John England will widen the range offered into apparel, curtaining, upholstery and theatrical linens for film and stage productions.
