= Downhill Strand =

Beach in County Londonderry, Northern Ireland

Downhill Strand / Benone Strand
- Beach
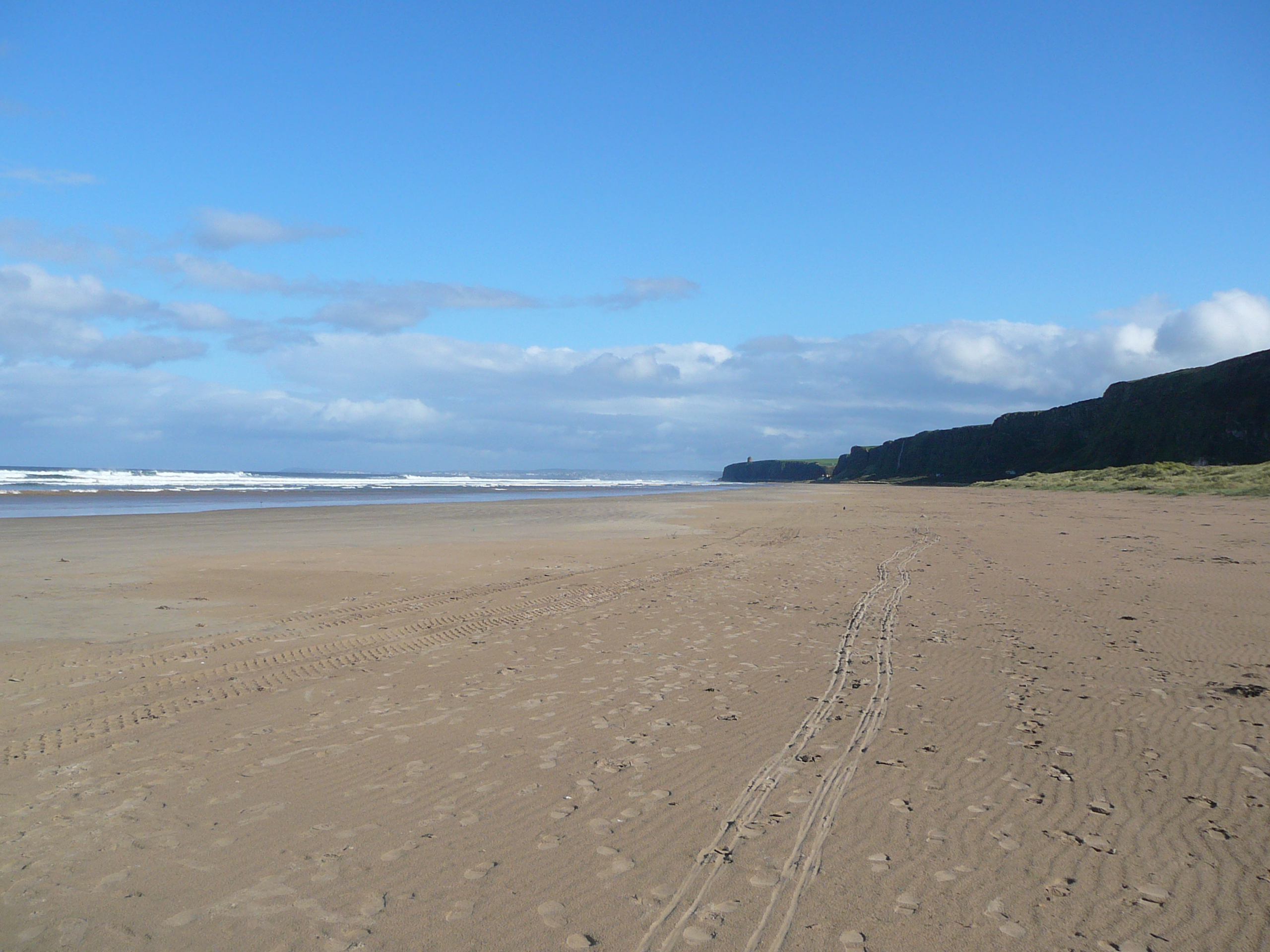
- Benone Strand, looking east towards Mussenden Temple

- Location within Northern Ireland
- Coordinates: 55.167811°N 6.872342°W
- Location: County Londonderry, Northern Ireland

Dimensions
  - Length: 7 miles (11 km)

Downhill Strand (better known as Benone Strand) is a beach in County Londonderry, Northern Ireland.

At 7 miles (11 km) long it is one of the longest in Northern Ireland, and recipient of the European Blue Flag and Seaside Award.

It is located next to the A2 road, and the Derry to Coleraine section of the Belfast–Derry railway line. Mussenden Temple and the village of Downhill are located at the eastern end of Benone Strand.
