= Benone =

Tourist destination in County Londonderry, Northern Ireland

- Tourist destination
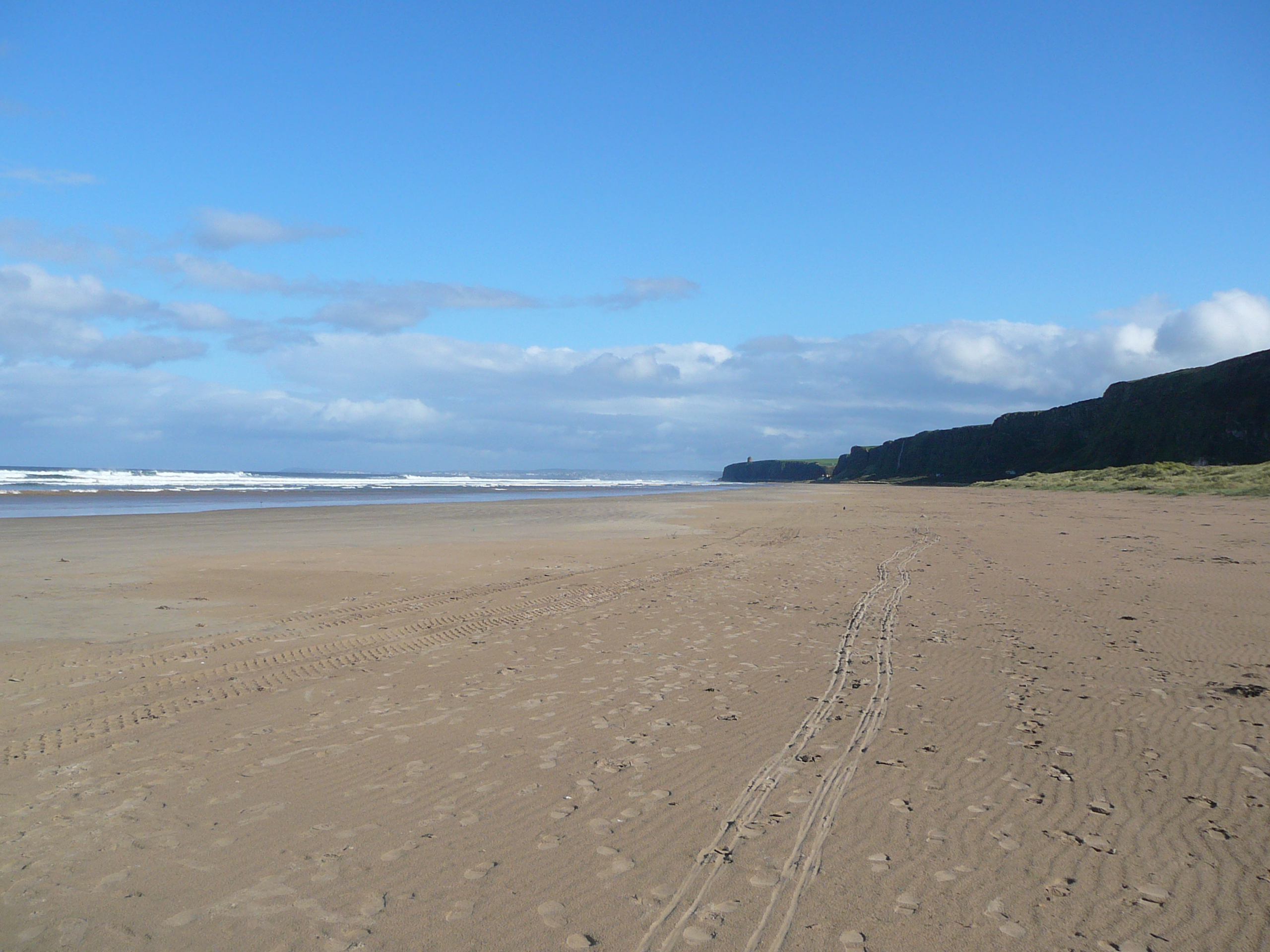
- Benone Strand, looking east towards Mussenden Temple

- Location within the United Kingdom
- Coordinates: 55.168°N 6.879°W
- Country: United Kingdom
- Province: Northern Ireland
- County: County Londonderry
- District: Causeway Coast and Glens

Benone is a popular tourist destination in the Causeway Coast and Glens district, County Londonderry, Northern Ireland.

Benone has several caravan sites, such as Golden Sands, Deighans' and a leisure complex with excellent facilities, including a 9-hole golf course (all par 3) and numerous tennis courts.

A short walk leads to Benone Strand, seven miles of beach and sand dunes on the north coast of Northern Ireland between Castlerock and the Magilligan peninsula, most of the distance between the mouth of the River Bann and Lough Foyle. It is one of the longest beaches in Northern Ireland, and recipient of the European Blue Flag and Seaside Award.

== Railway access ==
The Belfast-Derry railway line connects to Castlerock station which is a walk over the Downhill Tunnels and Mussenden Temple to Downhill. From Castlerock, westwards trains go to Bellarena and Derry~Londonderry, and eastwards trains go to Coleraine and ultimately Belfast Grand Central.
