= Stranocum =

Village in County Antrim, Northern Ireland

Coordinates: 55.1085°N 6.4195°W

Stranocum: Irish: Sraith Nócam
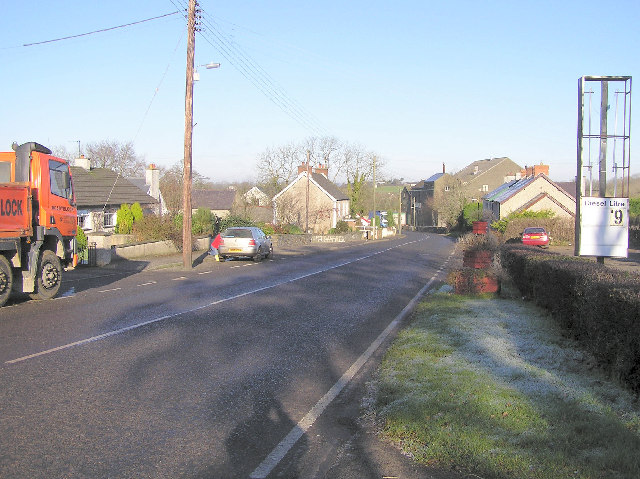
- The main road through the village

- Location within Northern Ireland
- Population: 321
  - Belfast: 40 mi (64 km)
- District: Causeway Coast and Glens
- County: County Antrim
- Country: Northern Ireland
- Sovereign state: United Kingdom
- Post town: BALLYMONEY
- Postcode district: BT53
- Dialling code: 028
- Police: Northern Ireland
- Fire: Northern Ireland
- Ambulance: Northern Ireland
- UK Parliament: North Antrim
- NI Assembly: North Antrim

Stranocum (from Irish Sraith Nócam) is a small village and townland in north County Antrim, Northern Ireland. The villages of Dervock and Armoy are nearby and the town of Ballymoney is about 5 miles (8 km) away. It had a population of 311 people in the 2021 Census. (2011 Census: 297 people)

The village is west of the River Bush and is mostly on the gentle hill down to the river. Although mainly a commuter village it does have some services. These include a supermarket and petrol station, a vehicle service garage, animal feeds mill, trout farm, Bushvalley Primary School and a park.

== Transport ==
Stranocum railway station opened on 18 October 1880, shut for goods traffic on 24 March 1924, and shut altogether on 3 July 1950. It was on the Ballycastle Railway, a narrow gauge railway that ran for 17 miles (27 km) between Ballycastle and Ballymoney. This was part of the Belfast and Northern Counties Railway (BNCR), later Northern Counties Committee (NCC), main line to Londonderry.

== Notable people ==
- Archibald Hutcheson (c. 1659–1740), MP for Hastings 1713–1727
