= Irish linen =

Brand name for linen woven in Ireland

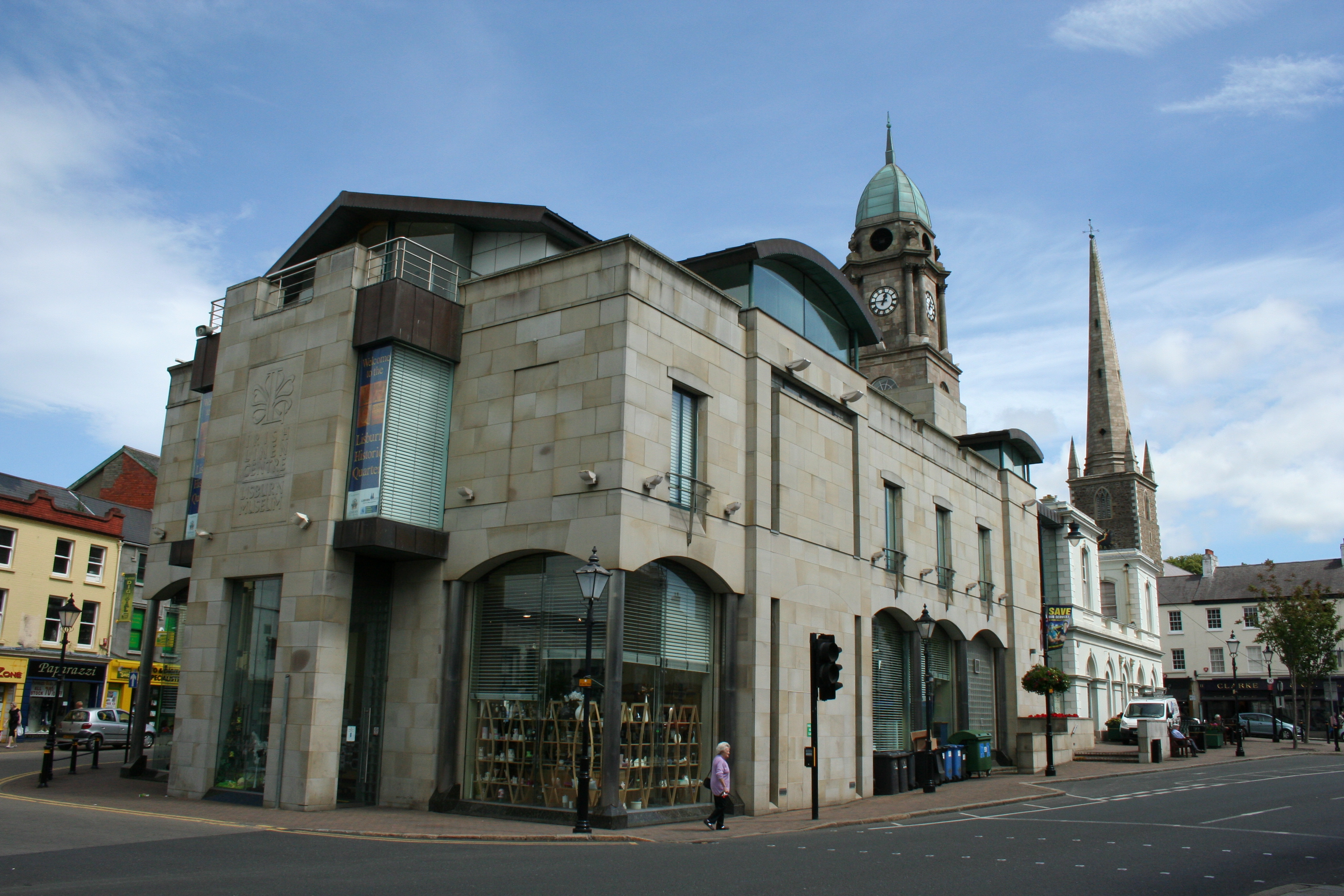
Irish Linen Centre, Lisburn

Irish linen (Irish: Línéadach Éireannach) is the name given to linen produced in Ireland (including both the Republic of Ireland and Northern Ireland). Linen is cloth woven from, or yarn spun from, flax fibre, which was grown in Ireland for many years before advanced agricultural methods and more suitable climate led to the concentration of quality flax cultivation in northern Europe.

== Production ==
Most of the world crop of quality flax is now grown in northern France, Belgium and the Netherlands. Since about the 1950s to 1960s, the flax fibre for Irish linen yarn has been imported almost exclusively from France, Belgium, and the Netherlands. It is bought by spinners who produce yarn, which is then sold to weavers (or knitters) who produce fabric. Irish linen spinning has now virtually ceased, yarns being imported from places such as the eastern part of the European Union and China.

Weaving today consists mainly of plain linens for niche, top-of-the-range, apparel uses. Linen damask weaving in Ireland has less capacity, and it is confined at very much the top end of the market for luxury end-uses. Companies who continue to weave in Ireland, including Thomas Ferguson & Co Ltd, tend to concentrate on the quality end of the market, and Jacquard weaving is moving towards the weaving of special and custom damask pieces, made to the customer's specific requirements. Fabric woven outside of Ireland and then brought to Ireland to be bleached or dyed and finished cannot carry the Irish Linen Guild logo, which is the Guild trademark, and signifies the genuine Irish Linen brand.

== Definition ==
The Irish Linen Guild has defined Irish linen as yarn which is spun in Ireland from 100% flax fibres. It is not required that every stage from the growing of the flax to the weaving must take place in Ireland. To be Irish linen fabric, the yarns do not necessarily have to come from an Irish spinner; to be Irish linen (yarn), the flax fibre does not have to be grown in Ireland. However, the skills, craftsmanship, and technology that go into spinning the yarn must be Irish – as is the case with Irish linen fabric, where the design and weaving skills must be Irish. Finished garments or household textile items can be labelled Irish linen, although they may have been made up in another country. Irish linen does not refer to the making-up process (such as cutting and sewing).
