= Irish Linen Guild =

Professional association founded 1928

- Founded: 1928
- Type: Professional Association
- Purpose: To promote Irish linen in the national and international markets.
- Location: island of Ireland
- Region served: Worldwide
- Website: Official website

Irish Linen Guild is a promotional organization of the Irish linen industry that was founded in 1928. The Guild's main role is to promote Irish linen in national and international markets, through its website.

The guild's brand's trademark is the focus of all promotional activities. This mark is often colloquially referred to as the 'carpet beater symbol'. It can only be used to mark genuine Irish linen products such as linen yarn spun in Ireland and linen fabrics woven in Ireland by members of the Guild.

Products made from genuine Irish linen fabric, such as garments or table linens, can be labelled Irish linen although the made up item may have been assembled elsewhere.
