= Bushmills, County Antrim =

Village in County Antrim, Northern Ireland

Coordinates: 55.2037°N 6.5232°W

Bushmills: Irish: Muileann na Buaise; Scots: Bushmill
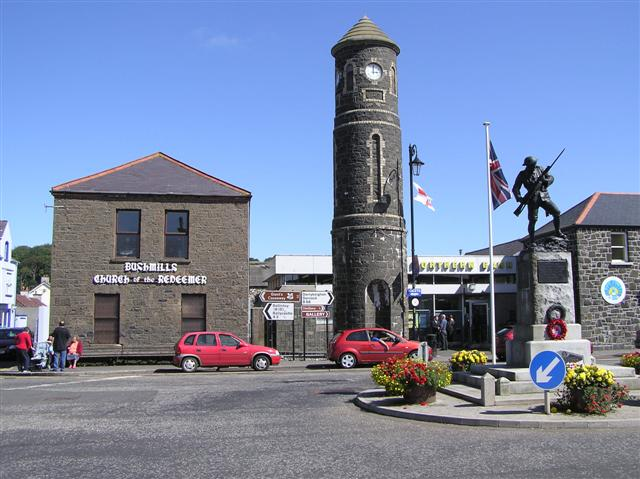

- Location within Northern Ireland
- Population: 1,247 (2021 Census)
- District: Causeway Coast and Glens
- County: County Antrim
- Country: Northern Ireland
- Sovereign state: United Kingdom
- Post town: BUSHMILLS
- Postcode district: BT57
- Dialling code: 028
- UK Parliament: North Antrim
- NI Assembly: North Antrim

Bushmills (Irish Gaelic: Muileann na Buaise) is a village on the north coast of County Antrim, Northern Ireland. Bushmills had a population of 1,247 in the 2021 Census. It is located 60 miles (97 km) from Belfast, 11 miles (18 km) from Ballycastle and 9 miles (14 km) from Coleraine. The village owes its name to the River Bush and to a large watermill that was built there in the early 17th century. It is home to the Old Bushmills Distillery, which produces Irish whiskey, and is near the Giant's Causeway.

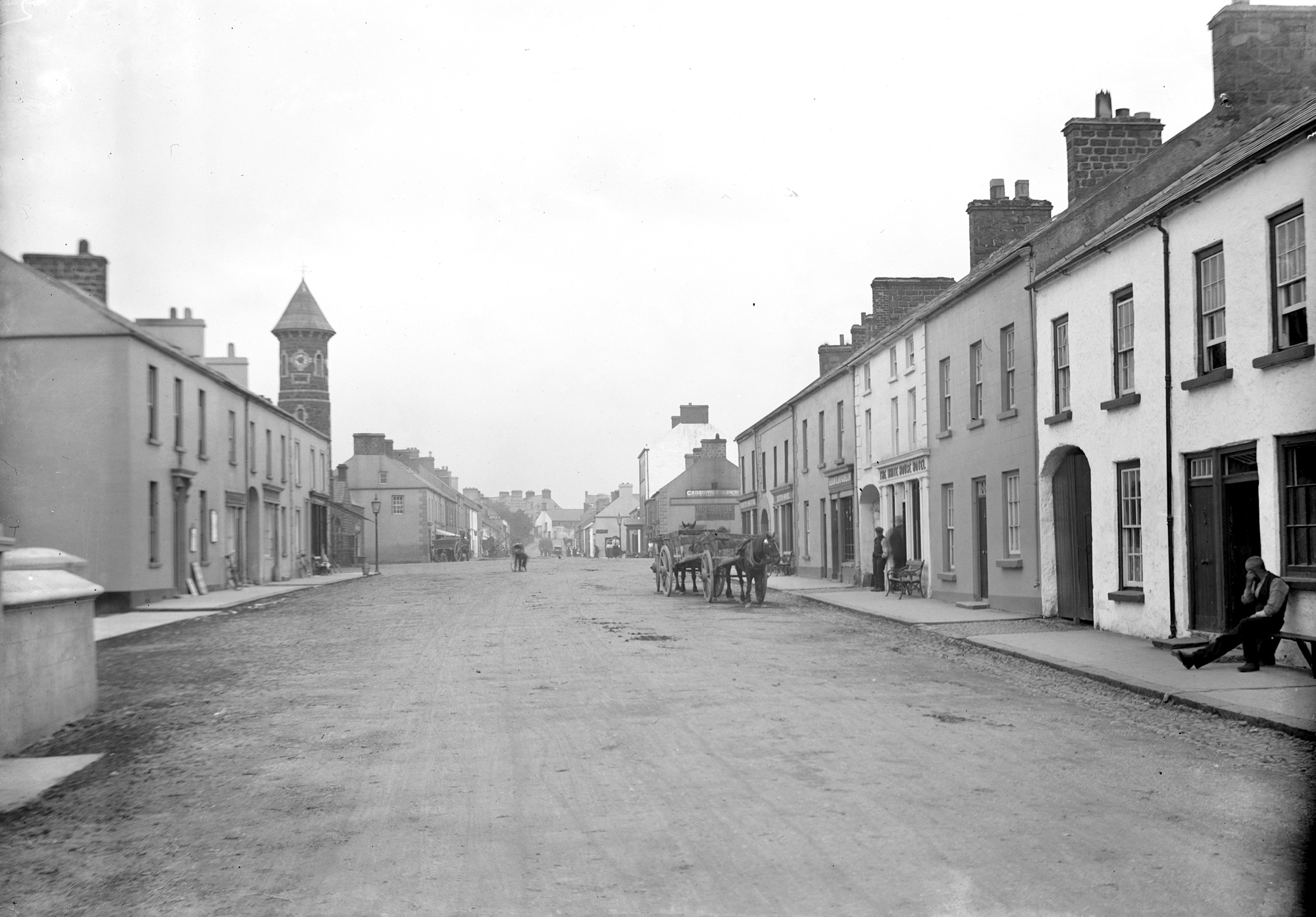
Bushmills in the early 20th century

== Demography ==
=== 2021 Census ===
Bushmills is labelled as Super Data Zone Causeway_C by Northern Ireland Statistics and Research Agency. On Census day (21 March 2021) there were 1,247 people living in Bushmills. Of these:

- 89.1% were from a 'Protestant and Other Christian (including Christian related)' community background and 2.7% were from a Catholic community background.
- 75.0% identified as British, 2.6% identified as Irish and 34.5% identified as Northern Irish (Respondents could choose more than one national identity).

=== 2011 Census ===
Bushmills is classified as a village (population 1,000–2,499) by the Northern Ireland Statistics and Research Agency (NISRA). On Census day (27 March 2011) there were 1,295 people living in Bushmills. Of these:

- 20.39% were under 16 years old and 21.47% were aged 65 and above.
- 46.64% of the population were male and 53.36% were female.
- 92.90% were from a 'Protestant and Other Christian (including Christian related)' community background and 3.47% were from a Catholic community background.

== Places of interest ==
The village is best known as the location of the Old Bushmills Distillery. The distillery's products include the Bushmills Original and Black Bush blends, as well as the 10-, 12-, 16-, and 21-year-old Bushmills Single Malts. To celebrate the 400th anniversary of distilling starting in the area the distillery released a unique whiskey called the "1608" which included crystal malt. The distillery draws its water, not from the River Bush itself, but from a tributary known as Saint Columbs Rill.

The Giant's Causeway, which attracts over two million visitors per year, is located 2 miles (3.2 km) north of the town.

== Transport ==
Bushmills railway station opened on 28 January 1883, but finally closed on 1 October 1949. There is a narrow-gauge steam train running in the summer from Bushmills to the Giant's Causeway.

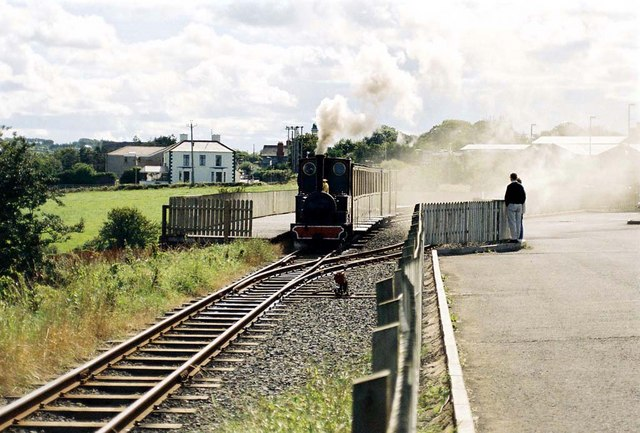
Bushmills Station with a steam locomotive on the 3 ft gauge track.

The Belfast-Derry railway line run by Northern Ireland Railways connects to Coleraine and along the branch line to Portrush. Local Ulsterbus provides connections to the railway stations. There is a scenic walk of 7 miles from Portrush alongside Dunluce Castle and the Giant's Causeway and Bushmills Railway.

== Twin towns ==
Bushmills is twinned with Louisville, Kentucky, in the United States.

== Education ==
Schools in the area include Dunluce School and Bushmills Primary School.

== Churches ==
There are a few churches in the village:

- Bushmills Presbyterian Church, Main Street, Magheraboy (1646)
- Bushmills Gospel Hall, Priestland Road, Ballaghmore
- Bushmills Free Presbyterian Church, Priestland Road, Walk Mill
- St. John The Baptist Church of Ireland, Priestland Road, Glebe (1821)
- St. Mary's Roman Catholic Church, Priestland Road, Ballaghmore

== Notable people ==
- Norman Parke, a Mixed Martial Artist who fights in the UFC, was born and raised in Bushmills.
- Caroline McElnay, Director of Public Health for the New Zealand Ministry of Health, was born and raised in Bushmills.

== Navigation history ==
Bushmills was the location of one of the five Consol Navigation System transmitter stations in the years following the Second World War.
