= Castlerock =

Seaside village in County Londonderry, Northern Ireland

Coordinates: 55.15°N 6.783333°W

Castlerock: Irish: Carraig Ceasail
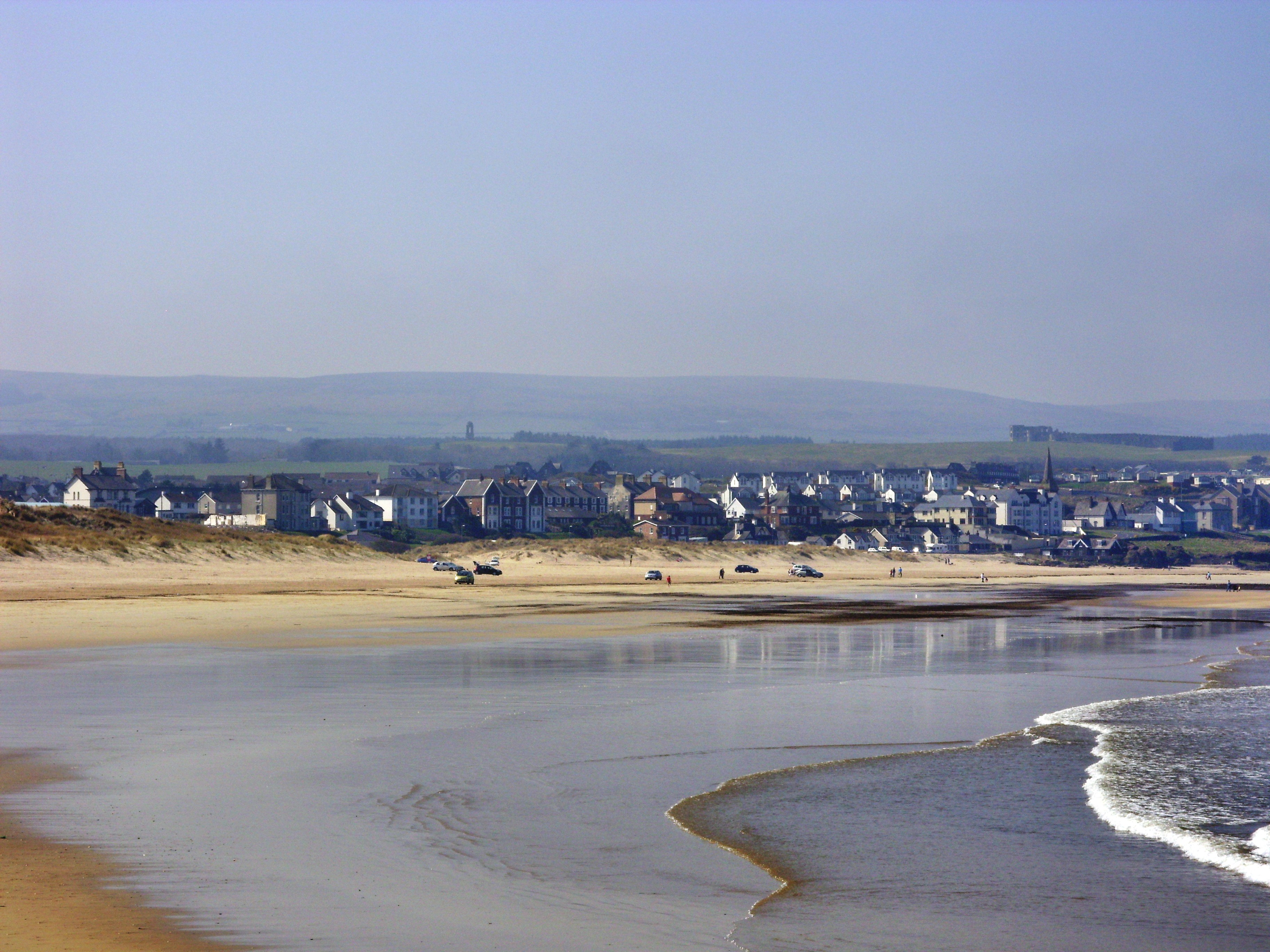
- Castlerock, as seen from Castlerock beach in 2010

- Location within Northern Ireland
- Population: 1,155 (2021 census)
- Irish grid reference: C755341
  - Belfast: 52 mi (84 km)
- District: Causeway Coast and Glens
- County: County Londonderry
- Country: Northern Ireland
- Sovereign state: United Kingdom
- Post town: COLERAINE
- Postcode district: BT51
- Dialling code: 028
- Police: Northern Ireland
- Fire: Northern Ireland
- Ambulance: Northern Ireland
- UK Parliament: East Londonderry
- NI Assembly: East Londonderry

Castlerock is a seaside village in County Londonderry, Northern Ireland. It is five miles west of Coleraine, and part of Causeway Coast and Glens district. It is very popular with summer tourists, with numerous apartment blocks and two caravan sites. Castlerock Golf Club has both 9-hole and 18-hole links courses bounded by the beach, the River Bann and the Belfast to Derry railway line. The village had a population of 1,155 people at the 2021 census, and is where near by village Articlave F.C play their home games.

== History ==
The Earl-Bishop

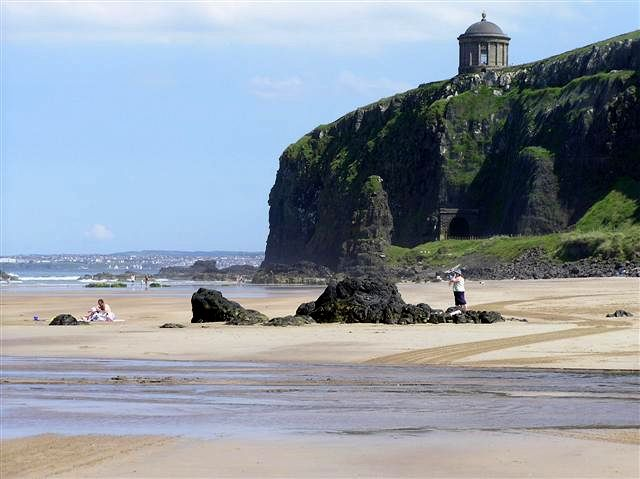
View of Mussenden Temple from the beach

Local historical interest is concentrated on the 18th century Bishop of Derry's ruined Downhill House, the Mussenden Temple on the clifftop, and the Black Glen set within the Downhill Estate, which is now owned by the National Trust. The palace and estate were created by Frederick Hervey, 4th Earl of Bristol who was the Bishop of Derry in the 1780s. The Mussenden Temple, with its precarious perch on the basalt cliff edge is one of the most photographed scenes in Ireland.

The 17th century Hezlett House is a thatched cottage with a cruck structure and is situated at the crossroads near the village. Built around 1691, it was originally a rectory or farmhouse. Also at the adjacent crossroads is an ancient tree.

The bodies of the two victims of infamous dentist Colin Howell were found in Castlerock on 19 May 1991.

Castlerock was relatively untouched by the Troubles, with only one fatal incident occurring in or near the village as part of the conflict. The "Castlerock killings" took place in March 1993, when four men were shot dead by a group calling itself "Ulster Freedom Fighters", a covername used by the Ulster Defence Association (UDA). One of the men convicted for the murders was Coleraine loyalist Torrens Knight.

== Demography ==
Castlerock is classified as a village by the Northern Ireland Statistics and Research Agency (NISRA) (i.e. with population between 1,000 and 2,250 people).

=== 2001 Census ===
On Census day in 2001, there were 1,336 people usually-resident in Castlerock across 570 households.

Of these:

- 22.2% were aged under 16 and 17.1% were aged 65 and over
- 46.6% of the population were male and 53.4% were female.
- 11.9% currently identified as Catholic, 70% identified as Protestant, 3.1% identified as other religions or denominations, and 15% identified as non-religious.
- 2.3% of people aged 16–74 were unemployed.

=== 2011 Census ===
On Census day in 2011, there were 1,256 people usually-resident in Castlerock across 554 households.

Of these:

- 17.9% were aged 15 or under, and 22.9% were aged 65 or over.
- 47.7% of the population were male and 52.3% were female.
- 14.5% currently identified as Catholic, 64.1% identified as Protestant, 5% identified as other religions or denominations, and 16.2% identified as non-religious.
- 3.5% of the working-age population were unemployed.

=== 2021 Census ===
On Census day in 2021, there were 1,155 people usually-resident in Castlerock across 554 households.

Of these:

- 12.8% were aged 14 or under and 32.6% were aged 65 and over.
- 46% of the population were male and 54% were female.
- 12.7% currently identified as Catholic, 55.7% identified as Protestant, 6% identified as other religions or denominations, and 25.7% identified as non-religious.
- 2.2% of the working-age population were unemployed.

== Transport ==
Castlerock railway station opened on 18 July 1853. NI Railways currently run a mostly hourly service in both directions (west to Derry~Londonderry or east to Coleraine and onward to Belfast Lanyon Place and Belfast Grand Central) daily, and only five trains each way on Sunday. Ulsterbus services tend to coincide roughly with the times of the railway service and proceed either west towards Limavady or east to Coleraine.

== Facilities ==
Castlerock is home to Guysmere Summer Camp, which is owned and run by the Presbyterian Church.

Castlerock Golf Club has the Mussendan course, an 18 hole Championship links course and the Bann course, a 9 hole links course.

== Education ==
- Hezlett Primary School
- Ballyhacket Primary School (Closed in 2021 due to dwindling pupil numbers)

== People ==
The actor James Nesbitt lived in Castlerock as a teenager.

The village was a holiday destination for the famous author C. S. Lewis. Born in Belfast, he holidayed in Castlerock as a child and took inspiration from Downhill House for some of his books including The Lion, the Witch and the Wardrobe.

== See also ==
- List of towns and villages in Northern Ireland
