= Portballintrae =

Seaside village in County Antrim, Northern Ireland

Coordinates: 55.21403°N 6.545792°W

Portballintrae: Irish: Port Bhaile an Trá
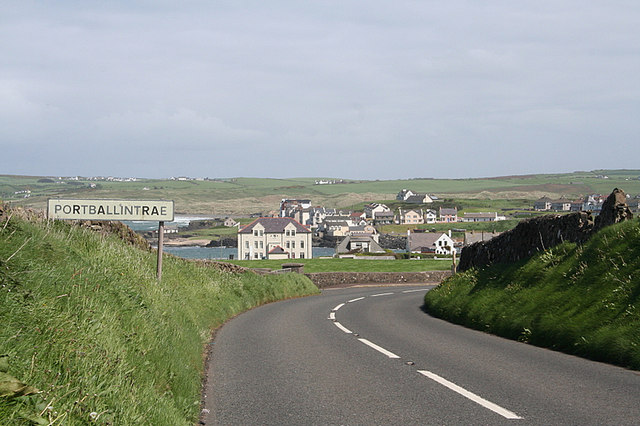
- Road leading into the village

- Location within Northern Ireland
- Population: 500 (2021 census)
- District: Causeway Coast and Glens
- County: County Antrim
- Country: Northern Ireland
- Sovereign state: United Kingdom
- Post town: BUSHMILLS
- Postcode district: BT57
- Dialling code: 028
- UK Parliament: North Antrim
- NI Assembly: North Antrim

Portballintrae (from Irish Port Bhaile an Trá, meaning 'port of the beach settlement') is a small seaside village in County Antrim, Northern Ireland. It is four miles east of Portrush and two miles west of the Giant's Causeway. In the 2021 census, Portballintrae had a population of 500. It lies within the Causeway Coast and Glens District Council area.

== History ==
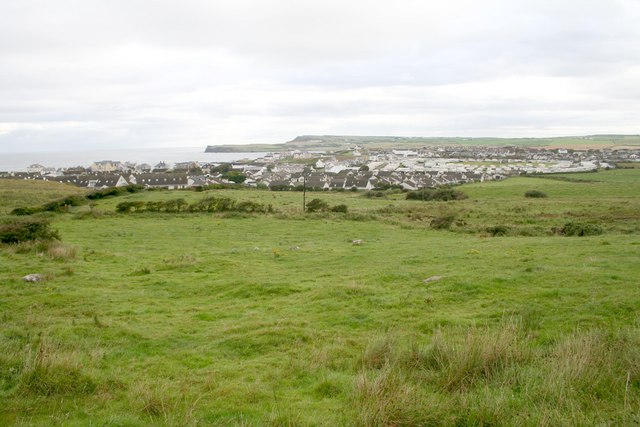
Portballintrae from the A2 road to Bushmills.

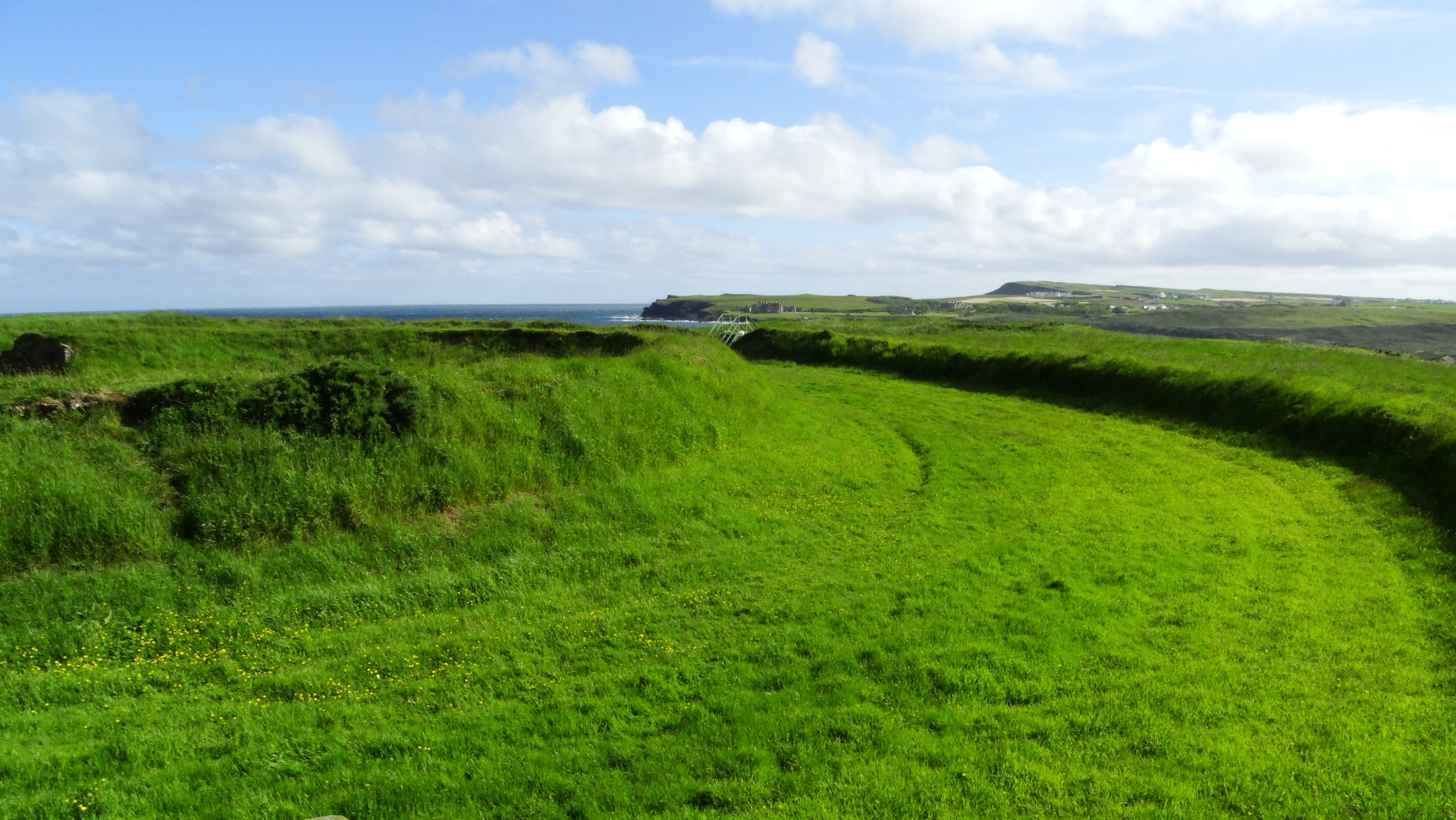
Lissanduff Earthworks, Portballintrae

=== Spanish Armada ===
Between 1967 and April 1968 a team of Belgian divers (including Robert Sténuit, the world's first aquanaut), located the remains of the wreck of the Girona off the coast of Portballintrae and brought up the greatest find of Spanish Armada treasure salvaged up until that time. The recovered artefacts are now on display in the Ulster Museum in Belfast.

=== Places of interest ===
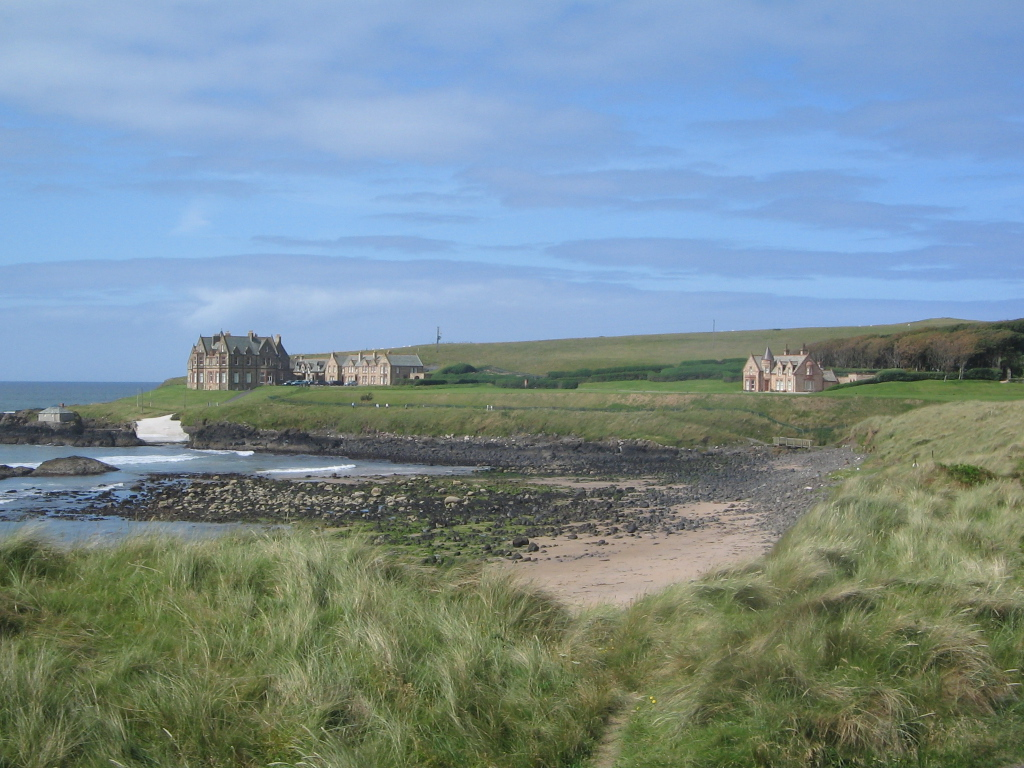
Runkerry House as it stands today

The ruins of Dunluce Castle sit on the edge of a cliff between Portballintrae and Portrush. The castle was the main stronghold of the MacDonnell chiefs of Antrim.

Much of Portballintrae and its surrounding area is owned by the Macnaghten family of Dundarave House and Runkerry House. Runkerry, once the home of Edward Macnaghten, Baron Macnaghten, has since been converted into a series of apartments.

The Giant's Causeway Tramway runs through the sand dunes above the largest beach in Portballintrae, commonly known as Runkerry Strand, and Bushfoot Golf Club. This tourist railway runs between The Giants Causeway and Bushmills.

The Lissanduff Earthworks are located between the river Bush and the sea and are classified as a State Care Monument. The site consists of two sets of concentric earthen banks. The lower banks are lined with clay to retain water for use in rituals.

=== Proposed development ===
In 2007, Portballintrae was proposed as a location for a golf course development by American real-estate developer Donald Trump.
