= Mussenden Temple =

Historical building in north-western Northern Ireland

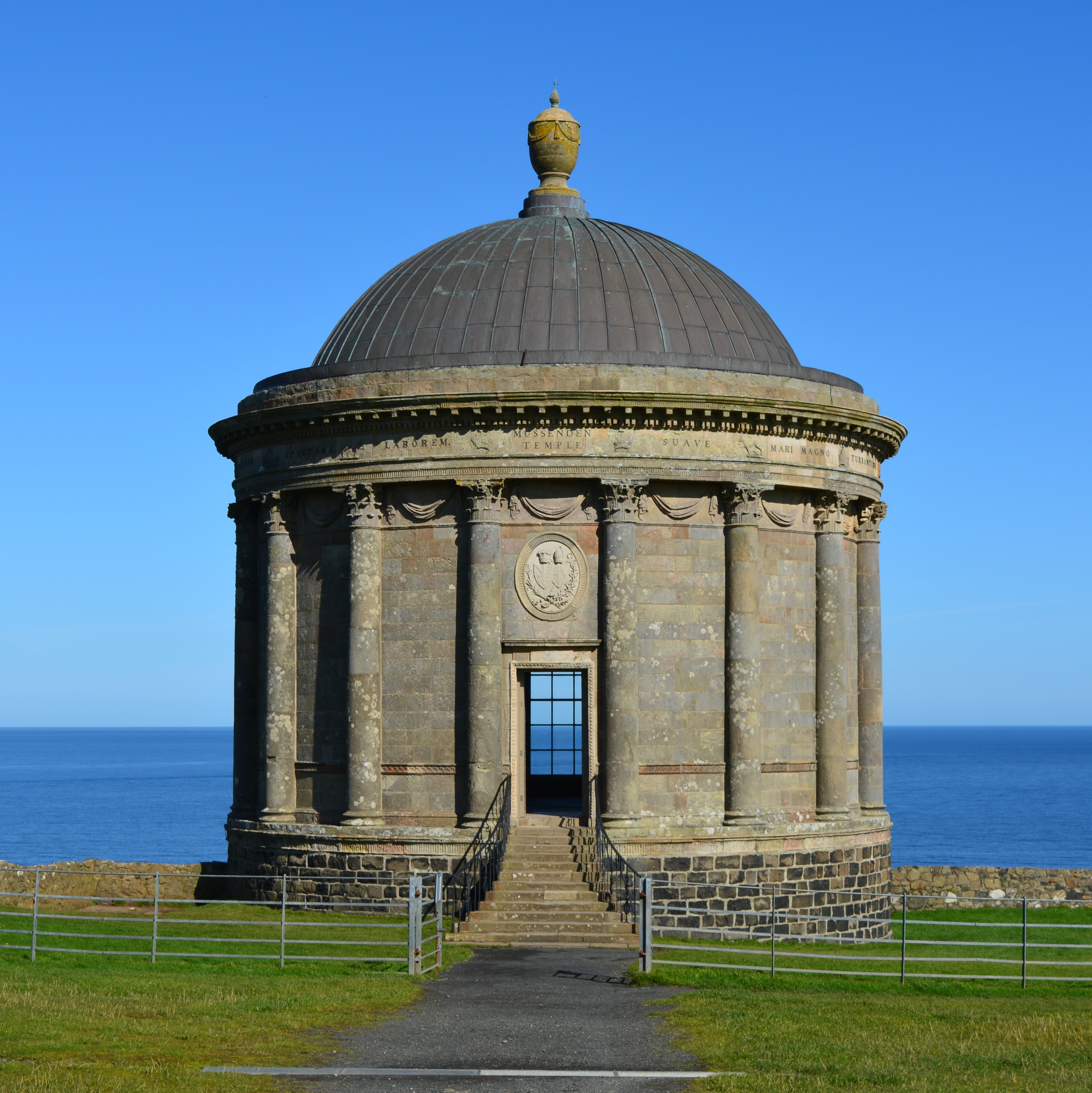
- Interactive map of the Mussenden Temple area

General information
- Location: County Londonderry, Northern Ireland
- Coordinates: 55.167789°N 6.810845°W
- Inaugurated: 1785
- Owner: National Trust

Mussenden Temple is a small circular building located on cliffs near Castlerock in County Londonderry, high above the Atlantic Ocean on the north-western coast of Northern Ireland.

== History ==
Perched on the cliffs overlooking Downhill Strand, it was once possible to drive a carriage around the temple: however, coastal erosion has brought the edge closer to the building. The temple was built in 1785 and forms part of the Downhill Demesne. The demesne was formerly part of the estate of Frederick Hervey, 4th Earl of Bristol, who served as the Church of Ireland Bishop of Derry from 1768 until 1803. It was Lord Bristol – popularly known as "the Earl-Bishop" – who had the "temple" built. Constructed as a library and modelled from the Temple of Vesta in the Forum Romanum in Rome, it is dedicated to the memory of Bishop Lord Bristol's niece Frideswide Mussenden. Its walls were once lined with bookcases. A fire was kept burning constantly in the basement. This and its enclosed flue meant that, even in this very exposed location, the books never got damp.

Over the years the erosion of the cliff face at Downhill has brought Mussenden Temple ever closer to the edge, and in 1997 the National Trust carried out cliff stabilisation work to prevent the loss of the building.

The inscription around the building reads:

Suave, mari magno turbantibus aequora ventis
e terra magnum alterius spectare laborem.

Translation:

Tis pleasant, safely to behold from shore
The troubled sailor, and hear the tempests roar.

The quotation is from Lucretius, De rerum natura, 2.1–2.

Built as a wedding gift to his niece, Mrs. Frideswide Mussenden, and named in her honour, this library was to be a place she could retire when she visited him. He referred to her as his "cher cousin" and it's believed he greatly admired her beauty. There was some scandal at the time about the nature of their relationship, which may have caused her some distress and hastened her death.

"I intend to build a Grecian temple in Frideswide's honour... I intend to build it on the edge of a cliff. It will give employment to the poor, to the district and employment." The Earl Bishop was clearly heartbroken when Frideswide died. His notes on the building state that it was based on Bramante's Tempietto on Rome's Janiculum Hill, which itself based on the Temple of Vesta at Tivoli near Rome. The building was probably the work of Micheal Shanahan who accompanied the Earl Bishop on one of his many visits to Italy.

== National Trust ==
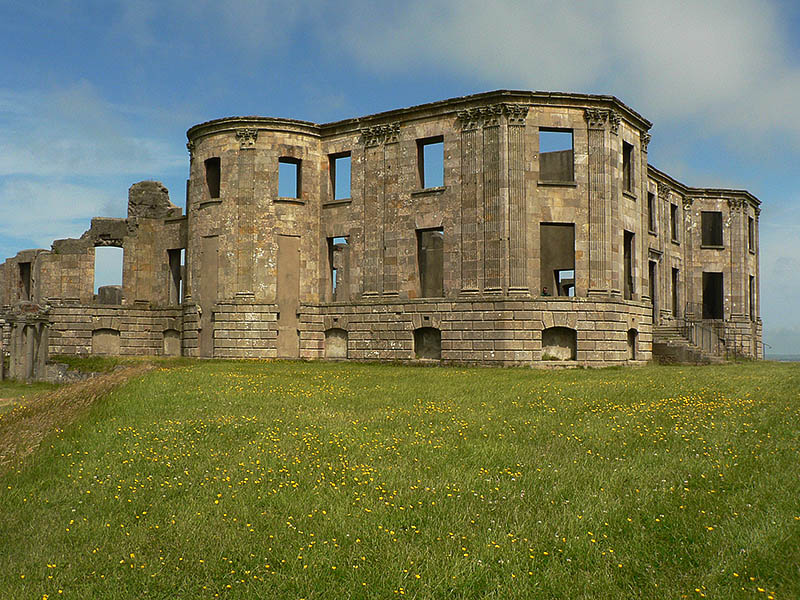
Downhill Castle

Now part of The National Trust property of Mussenden Temple and Downhill Demesne, the grounds encompassing Mussenden Temple, and its manor house (Downhill Castle) are open to the public all year, from dawn to dusk. The "Temple" offers views westwards over Downhill Strand towards Magilligan Point and on across to Inishowen in County Donegal; and to the east, Castlerock beach towards Portstewart, Portrush and Fair Head.

The temple obtained a licence to hold civil wedding ceremonies in 2007.

The nearest station is Castlerock railway station.
