= List of museums in Northern Ireland =

This list of museums in Northern Ireland contains museums which are defined for this context as institutions (including nonprofit organizations, government entities, and private businesses) that collect and care for objects of cultural, artistic, scientific, or historical interest and make their collections or related exhibits available for public viewing. Also included are non-profit art galleries, university art galleries and interpretive centres linked to sites of interest. Museums that exist only in cyberspace (i.e., virtual museums) are not included. Many other small historical displays are located in the country's stately homes, including those run by the National Trust.

== Active museums ==
Name	Image	Town/City	County	Type	Summary
Belfast City
Belfast Exposed		Belfast	Antrim	Art	Contemporary photography
Crumlin Road Gaol		Belfast	Antrim	Prison	Victorian-era prison under restoration as a museum
Discover Ulster-Scots Centre		Belfast	Antrim	History, Art	website, art, exhibitions, genealogy, history of Ulster Scots people and dialect
Engine Room Gallery		Belfast	Antrim	Art	website, contemporary art
Golden Thread Gallery		Belfast	Antrim	Art	Contemporary art
Irish Republican History Museum		Belfast	Antrim	History	History and artefacts of the Provisional Irish Republican Army
Linen Hall Library		Belfast	Antrim	History	Exhibits of art, history and culture from its collections
Loyalist Conflict Museum		Belfast	Antrim	History	website, Andy Tyrie Interpretative Centre, history of the Ulster Defence Association
Metropolitan Arts Centre		Belfast	Antrim	Art	Known as the MAC: Art centre and performance venue in the Cathedral quarter of Belfast; opened in 2012, the building has received several architectural awards
Museum of Orange Heritage: Schomberg House		Belfast	Antrim	History	website, historical artifacts, archival collections, and educational exhibits on Orange Order tradition and culture. Home to Grand Orange Lodge of Ireland
Museum of Unionist Military History		Belfast	Antrim	Military	associated with the Ballymac Friendship Trust, Unionist history and artefacts
Naughton Gallery at Queen's		Belfast	Antrim	Art	Contemporary art, part of Queen's University Belfast
Northern Ireland War Memorial Museum		Belfast	Antrim	Military	Commemorates the fallen of World War I and World War II, life during the 1941 Belfast Blitz
Ormeau Baths Gallery		Belfast	Antrim	Art	Contemporary art
Police Service of Northern Ireland Museum		Belfast	Antrim	History	website, Displays of uniforms, medals, archives, history of the Royal Irish Constabulary, Royal Ulster Constabulary and Police Service of Northern Ireland
Red Barn Gallery		Belfast	Antrim	Art	Photography gallery, also known as RBG Belfast
Royal Ulster Rifles Museum		Belfast	Antrim	Regimental	Regimental uniforms, badges, medals, memorabilia
Titanic's Dock and Pumphouse		Belfast	Antrim	Industry, Maritime	website, Edwardian-era pump house & dry-dock with exhibits on shipbuilding in Belfast, Harland & Wolff, launch of the RMS Titanic
Titanic Belfast		Belfast	Antrim	Maritime	a visitor attraction and monument to Belfast's maritime heritage; it tells the stories of the ill-fated Titanic and her sister ships.
Ulster Museum		Belfast	Antrim	Art, History, Industry, Natural history	Fine art, decorative arts, natural history, archaeology, Ancient Egypt, world cultures, geology, history
W5		Belfast	Antrim	Science	website, science-based exhibits with an emphasis on ""play""
County Antrim
Andrew Jackson Cottage		Carrickfergus	Antrim	Historic house	Open by appointment, restored 18th-century home of President Andrew Jackson's parents.
Arthur Cottage		Cullybackey	Antrim	Historic house	Restored late-18th-century-period ancestral home of Chester A. Arthur, the 21st President of the United States
Ballance House		Glenavy	Antrim	Historic house	website, birthplace of John Ballance, Premier of New Zealand from 1891–1893
Ballycastle Museum		Ballycastle	Antrim	Local	website, NIarchive local history, culture
Ballymoney Museum		Ballymoney	Antrim	Local	NIarchive, local history, culture, art, motorcycling - Joey Dunlop and the Armoy Armada
The Braid		Ballymena	Antrim	Local	website, history, arts and culture, includes the Mid-Antrim Museum and Braid Arts Centre
Brookhall Historical Farm		Lisburn	Antrim	Rural	website, information, open by appointment, farm artefacts
Carrickfergus Castle		Carrickfergus	Antrim	Historic house	Operated by the NIEA, Norman castle with military uses until the 1920s, exhibits about it history and use
Carrickfergus Museum		Carrickfergus	Antrim	Local	website, local history, art, archaeology
Causeway School Museum		Bushmills	Antrim	Historic house	information, 1920s period school, structure designed by Clough Williams-Ellis
Coastal Zone at Portrush		Portrush	Antrim	Natural history	Operated by the NIEA, marine and natural history, environment and local history
Flame The Gasworks Museum of Ireland		Carrickfergus	Antrim	Industry	website, restored coal gasworks and appliances
Giant's Causeway		Bushmills	Antrim	Natural history	Operated by the National Trust, new visitor centre to open in 2011 with exhibits about the geology and natural history of the basalt columns and coast and also has a railway
Irish Linen Centre and Lisburn Museum		Lisburn	Antrim	Industry	website, Irish linen industry and city history and culture
Larne Museum and Arts Centre		Larne	Antrim	Local	Local history, culture, art
Patterson's Spade Mill		Templepatrick	Antrim	Industry	website, operated by the National Trust, historic spade mill
Railway Preservation Society of Ireland		Whitehead	Antrim	Railway	Heritage railway and museum at the Whitehead Excursion Station
Rathlin Boathouse Visitor Centre		Rathlin Island	Antrim	Local	information, documents island life and the history & geography of the island
Sentry Hill		Carnmoney	Antrim	Historic house	website, 19th-century farmhouse: Victorian costume and artefacts
Ulster Aviation Society		Sprucefield	Antrim	Aviation	website, open for groups by pre-arrangement, aircraft and articles relating to Northern Ireland's aviation heritage, located in a hangar of RAF Long Kesh
White House, Newtownabbey		Newtownabbey	Antrim	Historic house	website, restored house dating back to the 16th century
County Armagh
Ardress House		Annaghmore	Armagh	Historic house	website, operated by the National Trust, 17th-century farmhouse with 18th-century interior, working farmyard with animals
Argory		Moy	Armagh	Historic house	website, operated by the National Trust, early-19th-century Irish gentry house with late-19th-century interior
Armagh County Museum		Armagh	Armagh	Local	Local history, natural history, culture, archaeology, costumes
Armagh Gaol		Armagh	Armagh	Prison	Constructed in 1780 and closed in 1986; due to be refurbished as an hotel; public tours available
Armagh Observatory		Armagh	Armagh	Science	Collection of large telescopes used for observations since the 18th century; other astronomical instruments and artefacts
Armagh Planetarium		Armagh	Armagh	Science	Planetarium and science museum featuring physics, space and astronomical exhibits inside the museum and on the grounds
Craigavon Museum		Craigavon	Armagh	Local	website, local history, agriculture, linen industry, culture
Dan Winter’s Cottage		Loughgall	Armagh	Historic house	website, website, 18th-century thatched cottage, home of Dan Winter, one of the founders of the Orange Order
Derrymore House		Bessbrook	Armagh	Historic house	Operated by the National Trust, late-18th-century thatched house
Keady Heritage Centre		Keady	Armagh	Local	website, local history, culture, linen industry, singer Tommy Makem
Lough Neagh Discovery Centre		Craigavon	Armagh	Natural history	website, website, natural history and environment of Lough Neagh and the Oxford Island National Nature Reserve
Market Place - Armagh Theatre and Arts Centre		Armagh	Armagh	Art	website
Moneypenny's Lock House		Craigavon	Armagh	Transport	information, lockkeeper's cottage for the Newry Canal
Milford House Museum		Milford	Armagh	Biographical	website, history of the home of William McCrum, wealthy Irish linen manufacturer and sportsman, includes family costumes, furniture and silver
Millennium Court Arts Centre		Portadown	Armagh	Art	website, arts centre with two galleries
Mullaghbawn Folk Museum		Mullaghbawn	Armagh	Historic house	information, traditional two-roomed thatched farm house and out buildings
Newry and Mourne Museum		Newry	Armagh	Local	website, located in Bagenal's Castle, local history, trades, fishing, industry, culture
Navan Centre, Fort and King Stables		Armagh	Armagh	Archaeology, History	Includes Iron Age circular earthwork, replica Iron Age dwelling, exhibits and living history interpretations
Northern Ireland's Secret Bunker		Portadown	Armagh	Military	website, Cold War-era monitoring bunker, open on select days
Ó Fíaich Heritage Centre		Cullyhana	Armagh	Biographical	website, life and artefacts of Tomás Ó Fiaich, Archbishop of Armagh and the Primate of All Ireland from 1978 until his death
Royal Irish Fusiliers Museum		Armagh	Armagh	Regimental	Regimental artefacts and memorabilia
Saint Patrick Trian Visitor Complex		Armagh	Armagh	Local	website, exhibits about Armagh's historic pagan monuments and history, St Patrick and the Book of Armagh, and author Jonathan Swift’s book Gulliver’s Travels and the fictional nation of Lilliput.
Sloan's Inn		Loughgall	Armagh	Historic house	Location of the formation of the Orange Order in 1795 after the Battle of the Diamond. It is an Orange Heritage Site. Audio and visual displays and artefacts.
Tannaghmore Animal Farm		Craigavon	Armagh	Rural	website, heritage animal breeds, farm tools and equipment
Ulster Special Constabulary Museum		Loughgall	Armagh	Regimental	Former RUC Station, documents the 50-year history of the Ulster Special Constabulary
County Down
Ballycopeland Windmill		Millisle	Down	Industry	Restored windmill and miller's house, operated by the NIEA
Bann Valley Museum		Banbridge	Down	Local	website, planned museum of local history and culture
Brontë Interpretive Centre		Rathfriland	Down	Biographical	information, exhibits about Patrick Brontë, the father of the Brontë sisters (Charlotte, Emily and Anne), who taught in the church and school
Burren Heritage Centre		Warrenpoint	Down	Local	information, local history, culture
Castle Ward		Strangford	Down	Historic house	Operated by the National Trust, 18th-century eccentric house with two distinctly different styles, classical and Gothic
Cockle Row Cottages		Groomsport	Down	Historic house	website, information, 1910 period typical fisherman's dwelling
Down County Museum		Downpatrick	Down	Prison, Local	website, located in an 18th-century gaol, local history, culture
Downpatrick and County Down Railway		Downpatrick	Down	Railway	Heritage railway and museum
F.E. McWilliam Gallery and Studio		Banbridge	Down	Art	website, information, works of surrealist sculptor F. E. McWilliam
Grey Point Fort		Helen's Bay	Down	Military	website, located in Crawfordsburn Country Park, one of a pair of artillery batteries guarding Belfast Lough during both 20th-century World Wars; its twin is near the Salt Mines at Kilroot
Kilclief Castle		Strangford	Down	Historic house	Medieval tower-house castle
Mount Stewart House, Garden and Temple of the Winds		Strangford	Down	Historic house	Operated by the National Trust
Nendrum Monastic Site		Strangford Lough	Down	Archaeology, Religious	Operated by the NIEA, ruins of medieval monastery and visitor centre museum with exhibits
North Down Museum		Bangor	Down	Local	website, information, local history, culture
Saint Patrick Visitor Centre		Downpatrick	Down	Religious	Displays on the life and story of Saint Patrick, the patron saint of Ireland
Scarva Visitor Centre		Scarva	Down	Local	information, local history, Newry Canal and the linen industry
Sir Samuel Kelly Lifeboat		Donaghadee	Down	Maritime	website, exhibition, information, historic RNLI Watson-class lifeboat preserved at the harbour by Donaghadee Heritage Preservation Company, known for saving 33 lives during Princess Victoria disaster
Somme Heritage Centre		Conlig	Down	Military	Ireland's military history in World War I, part of Somme Association
Ulster Folk Museum		Cultra	Down	Rural	Open air village with crafts demonstrations from the early 20th century
Ulster Transport Museum		Cultra	Down	Transport	Transport Museum with horse-drawn carriages, electric trams, motorbikes, fire engines and vintage cars, permanent RMS Titanic exhibit
War Years Remembered		Newtownards	Down	Military	website, World War I and II charity and museum
County Fermanagh
Belleek Pottery Visitor Centre		Belleek	Fermanagh	Art, Industry	Belleek fine porcelain pieces
Castle Archdale		Irvinestown	Fermanagh	Military	Country park with museum about the role of RAF Castle Archdale and coastal command based at Castle Archdale during World War II
Castle Coole		Enniskillen	Fermanagh	Historic house	Operated by the National Trust, late-18th-century mansion and estate
Fermanagh County Museum		Enniskillen	Fermanagh	Biographical, Local	County history, culture and natural history; the Maguire family
Inniskillings Museum		Enniskillen	Fermanagh	Regimental	Regimental history and artefacts of the Royal Inniskilling Fusiliers and the 5th Royal Inniskilling Dragoon Guards
Florence Court		Enniskillen	Fermanagh	Historic house	Operated by the National Trust, 18th-century mansion and estate
Headhunters Barbers Shop & Railway Museum		Enniskillen	Fermanagh	Railway	website, includes reconstructed railway booking office and railroad memorabilia of the Great Northern Railway (Ireland), the Sligo, Leitrim and Northern Counties Railway and the Clogher Valley Railway
Sheelin Antique Irish Lace Museum		Bellanaleck	Fermanagh	Industry	website, Irish lace dating from 1890–1920
County Londonderry
Amelia Earhart Centre		Derry	Londonderry	Aviation	website, located in Ballyarnett Country Park, open by appointment, local aviation history and story of local landing of Amelia Earhart
Apprentice Boys Siege Museum and Exhibition		Derry	Londonderry	History	History of the Apprentice Boys, story of the Siege of Derry and the Relief of Derry
Bellaghy Bawn		Bellaghy	Londonderry	Biographical, History, Local	website, operated by the NIEA, 17th-century fortified house and bawn with exhibits on local and natural history, the history of the Ulster Plantation and the poetry of Seamus Heaney
Coleraine Regional Museum		Coleraine	Londonderry	Local	website, NIarchive changing exhibits of local history, culture
Flowerfield Arts Centre		Portstewart	Londonderry	Art	website, includes exhibits of visual art and crafts
Foyle Valley Railway		Derry	Londonderry	Railway	website
Garvagh Museum		Garvagh	Londonderry	Rural	website, rural and domestic life in the 19th & early 20th centuries
Green Lane Museum		Limavady	Londonderry	Local	NIarchive Local history, linen and agricultural industry, rural life
Harbour Museum		Derry	Londonderry	Maritime	website, city's maritime history
Hezlett House		Castlerock	Londonderry	Historic house	Operated by the National Trust, 17th-century thatched cottage
Museum of Free Derry		Derry	Londonderry	History	1960s civil rights campaign and the Free Derry/early Troubles period of the early 1970s
Nerve Centre		Derry	Londonderry	Art	Multimedia arts centre for music, film, video, animation and interactive multimedia
Riverwatch Centre		Derry	Londonderry	Natural history	website, operated by the Loughs Agency, natural history and ecology of the River Foyle and Carlingford Lough waterways
Springhill House		Moneymore	Londonderry	Historic house	Operated by the National Trust, 17th-century plantation home, features costume collection
Tower Museum		Derry	Londonderry	Local	City's history, culture
Workhouse Museum		Derry	Londonderry	Local	website, historic workhouse, used for changing exhibits of city history and culture
County Tyrone
Abingdon Collection		Omagh	Tyrone	Transport	website, classic cars, World War II military memorabilia
Alley Theatre		Strabane	Tyrone	Art	website, theatre venue hosting an auditorium, art gallery and tourist information centre
Grant Ancestral Homestead		Ballygawley	Tyrone	Historic house	information, ancestral homestead of Ulysses S. Grant, the 18th President of the United States on his mother's side
Gray's Printing Press		Strabane	Tyrone	Historic house	website, operated by the National Trust, 18th-century print shop in which John Dunlap learned the printing trade
Hill of The O'Neill and Ranfurly House		Dungannon	Tyrone	Biographical, History	website NIarchive multi-media exhibition narrating the Hill’s importance in Irish and European history, its links to the O’Neills and the subsequent Flight of the Earls and Plantation of Ulster. Also arts and performance space
Lissan House		Cookstown	Tyrone	Historic house	Currently under restoration
Nally Heritage Centre		Carrickmore	Tyrone	Biographical	information, history of sports marketer Patrick Nally, the Carrickmore GAA club and local history
Strule Arts Centre		Omagh	Tyrone	Art	Arts centre with gallery
Ulster American Folk Park		Castletown	Tyrone	Rural	Open-air museum; Irish rural life, lifestyle and experiences of those immigrants who sailed from Ulster to America in the 18th and 19th centuries
Wellbrooke Beetling Mill		Cookstown	Tyrone	Industry	website, operated by the National Trust, working water-powered mill used in the processing of flax to make linen thread
Wilson Ancestral Home		Strabane	Tyrone	Historic house	information, 18th-century home of James Wilson, grandfather of U.S. President Woodrow Wilson

== Defunct museums ==
- Fernhill House (The People’s Museum), the listed building is in ownership of Belfast City Council Belfast
- Palace Stables Heritage Centre, now council offices, Armagh
- Ulster History Park, Gortin Tyrone

== See also ==
- Category:Tourist attractions in Northern Ireland
- Related lists for Northern Ireland
  - List of National Trust properties in Northern Ireland
  - List of nature reserves in Northern Ireland
  - List of parks in Northern Ireland
  - List of Ramsar sites in Northern Ireland
  - List of Areas of Special Scientific Interest in Northern Ireland
- List of museums
- Museums in the Republic of Ireland
- Museums in England
- Museums in Wales
- Museums in Scotland
