= List of parks in Northern Ireland =

The following is an incomplete list of Parks and Open Spaces in Northern Ireland.

== County Antrim ==
=== Other ===
- Antrim Lough Shore Park
- Ballyboley Forest
- Ballycastle Forest
- Ballypatrick Forest
- Bann Woods North Forest
- Bann Woods South Forest
- Breen Forest
- Capanagh Forest
- Carnfunnock Country Park, near Larne
- Clare Forest
- Cleggan Forest
- Craigs Forest
- Garry Forest
- Glenariff Forest Park
- Glenarm Forest
- Muckamore Forest
- The People's Park, Ballymena
- Portglenone Forest
- Randalstown Forest
- Slieveanorra Forest
- Tardree Forest
- Woodburn Forest

== County Armagh ==
- Ardress House
- Ballymoyer Forest
- Camlough Forest
- Carnagh Forest
- Cold Brae Forest
- Craigavon City Park
- Derrymore House
- Drumbanagher Forest
- Fathom Forest
- The Fews Forest
- Gosford Forest Park
- Loughgall Forest
- Loughgall Country Park
- Lurgan Park
- Maghery Country Park
- Navan Fort
- Oxford Island, Craigavon
- Peatlands Park
- Seagahan Forest
- Slieve Gullion Forest Park

== County Down ==
- Annalong Forest
- Ballymenoch Park, Holywood
- Ballysallagh Forest
- Ballywalter Park
- Belvoir Park Forest
- Bohill Forest
- Castle Ward
- Castlewellan Forest Park
- Clandeboye Forest
- Crawfordsburn Country Park
- Delamont Country Park, Killyleagh
- Donard Forest
- Drumkeeragh Forest
- Hillsborough Castle and Gardens
- Hillsborough Forest
- Hollymount Forest
- Kilbroney Park, Rostrevor
- Moat Park, Dundonald
- Mount Stewart House And Gardens
- Mourne Country Park
- Mourne Forest
- Murlough Nature Reserve
- Narrow Water Forest
- Quoile Pondage National Nature Reserve
- Redburn Country Park
- Rostrevor Forest
- Rowallane Gardens
- Scrabo Tower
- Tollymore Forest Park

== County Fermanagh ==
- Ballintempo Forest
- Belmore Forest
- Big Dog Forest
- Carnmore Forest
- Carrigan Forest
- Castle Archdale
- Castle Caldwell Forest
- Castle Coole
- Clabby Forest
- Conagher Forest
- Crocknagrally Forest
- Crom Estate
- Derrylin and Nann Island Forest
- Devenish Island
- Doon Forest
- Ely Lodge Forest
- Florence Court Forest Park
- Garrison Forest
- Grogey Forest
- Jenkin Forest
- Kesh Forest
- Knocks Forest
- Lough Navar Forest
- Marble Arch Caves Global Geopark
- Marlbank Forest
- Necarne Forest
- Pubble Forest
- Riversdale Forest
- Silees Forest
- Spring Grove Forest
- Tully Forest
- Tullychurry Forest
- White Island, County Fermanagh

== County Londonderry ==
- Aghadowey Forest
- Ballykelly Forest
- Banagher Glen, Dungiven
- Binevenagh Forest
- Brooke Park
- Cam Forest
- Creggan Country Park
- Derrynoyd Forest
- Downhill Forest
- Ervey Woods
- Garvagh Forest
- Glenshane Forest
- Gortnamoyagh Forest
- Grange Park Forest
- Iniscarn Forest
- Learmount Forest
- Loughermore Forest
- Loughermore East Forest
- Moyola Forest
- Muff Glen Forest
- Mussenden Temple and Downhill Demesne
- Ness Wood Country Park
- Roe Valley Country Park, Limavady
- Somerset Forest
- Springhill House
- Springwell Forest
- St. Columb's Park

== County Tyrone ==
- Aghyaran Forest
- Altmore Forest
- The Argory, Dungannon
- Baronscourt Forest
- Bradkeel Forest
- Caledon Forest
- Carrickaholten Forest
- Castlederg Forest
- Cookstown Forest
- Creggan Forest
- Davagh Forest Park
- Drum Manor Forest Park, Cookstown
- Dungannon Park
- Dunmoyle Forest
- Fardross Forest
- Favour Royal Forest
- Glenderg Forest
- Goles Forest
- Gortin Glen Forest Park
- Killens Forest
- Knockmany Forest
- Lack Forest
- Ligfordrum Forest
- Lough Bradan Forest
- Moneygal Forest
- Moydamlaght Forest
- Mullaghfad Forest
- Parkanaur Forest Park
- Pigeon Top Forest
- Pomeroy Forest
- Seskinore Forest
- Slievedoo Forest
- Trillick Forest
