= List of places in Northern Ireland =

This is a list of places in Northern Ireland.

== Settlements ==
- List of towns and villages in Northern Ireland
- List of cities in the United Kingdom#List of cities, sortable for Northern Ireland
- List of localities in Northern Ireland by population

== Subdivisions ==
- List of districts
  - by area
  - by population
  - by population density
  - by community make-up
- List of parliamentary constituencies
- List of baronies of Northern Ireland

== Natural features ==
- List of Hewitts in Northern Ireland
- List of Marilyns in Northern Ireland
- List of nature reserves in Northern Ireland
- List of parks in Northern Ireland
- List of Ramsar sites in Northern Ireland
- List of Special Areas of Conservation in Northern Ireland
- List of Areas of Special Scientific Interest in Northern Ireland

== County-specific lists ==
=== Antrim ===
- List of places in County Antrim
- List of civil parishes of County Antrim
- List of townlands in County Antrim

=== Armagh ===
- List of places in County Armagh
- List of civil parishes of County Armagh
- List of townlands in County Armagh

=== Down ===
- List of places in County Down
- List of civil parishes of County Down
- List of townlands in County Down

=== Fermanagh ===
- List of places in County Fermanagh
- List of civil parishes of County Fermanagh
- List of townlands in County Fermanagh

=== Londonderry ===
- List of places in County Londonderry
- List of civil parishes of County Londonderry
- List of townlands in County Londonderry

=== Tyrone ===
- List of places in County Tyrone
- List of civil parishes of County Tyrone
- List of townlands in County Tyrone

== See also ==
- List of places in Ireland
- Category:Northern Ireland-related lists
