= List of Areas of Special Scientific Interest in Northern Ireland =

This is a list of the Areas of Special Scientific Interest (ASSIs) in Northern Ireland, United Kingdom. In Northern Ireland the body responsible for designating ASSIs is the Northern Ireland Environment Agency - a division of the Department of Environment (DoE).

Unlike the SSSIs, ASSIs include both natural environments and man-made structures. As with SSSIs, these sites are designated if they have criteria based on fauna, flora, geological or physiographical features. On top of this, structures are also covered, such as the Whitespots mines in Conlig, according to several criterion including rarity, recorded history and intrinsic appeal.

For other sites in the rest of the United Kingdom, see List of SSSIs by Area of Search.

Site name	Reason for Designation			Area^{[A]}		Council	Year confirmed	Map
Site name	Biological Interest	Geological Interest	Historical or Cultural Interest	Hectares	Acres	Council	Year confirmed	Map
Aghabrack ASSI304						Strabane	2009	
Aghanloo Wood ASSI228	Yes			36.84	91.04	Limavady	2004	
Aghnadarragh		Yes		1.42	3.51	Antrim	2004	
Altikeeragh NNR048	Yes			n/a	n/a	Coleraine	2002^{[B]}	
Altikeeragh ASSI171	Yes			73.04	180.48	Coleraine	1999	
Altmover Glen	Yes			12.5	31	Limavady	1994	
Annachullion Lough	Yes			3.68	9.1	Fermanagh	1997	
Annacramph Meadows	Yes			1.01	2.5	Armagh	1992	
Antrim Hills	Yes			10,964.19	27,093.12	Ballymena; Larne; Moyle	2006^{[B]}	
Aughnadarragh Lough ASSI149	Yes			5.18	12.8	Ards; Down	1999	
Aughnadarragh Lough SAC045	Yes			5.18	12.8	Ards; Down	2005	
Ballybannan	Yes			0.59	1.47	Down	1997	
Ballycam	Yes			1.21	3	Down	1997	
Ballycarry	Yes			17.4	43	Moyle	1992	
Ballycastle Coalfield		Yes		27.68	68.4	Moyle	1998	
Ballygill North	Yes			31.57	78	Moyle	1992	
Ballykilbeg ASSI153	Yes			15.21	37.59	Down	1998	
Ballykilbeg SAC044	Yes			15.21	37.59	Down	2005	
Ballyknock	Yes			3.07	7.58	Magherafelt	1999	
Ballymacaldrack	?	?	?	1.01	2.5	Ballymoney	2007	
Ballymacallion	?	?	?	9.12	22.54	Limavady	2007	
Ballymaclary	Yes	Yes		n/a	n/a	Coleraine	1976^{[B]}	
Ballymacombs More	Yes	Yes	Yes	11.12	27.48	Magherafelt	2005	
Ballymacormick Point	Yes			15.78	39	North Down	1988	
Ballynagross Lower	Yes			3.1	7.67	Down	1997	
Ballynahone Bog SAC001	Yes			98.44	243.24	Magherafelt	2005	
Ballynahone Bog RSAR009	Yes			98.44	243.24	Magherafelt	1998	
Ballynahone Bog NNR047	Yes			n/a	n/a	Magherafelt	2000	
Ballynahone Bog ASSI010	Yes	Yes		98.74	244	Magherafelt	1995	
Ballynanaghten	Yes			0.48	1.19	Lisburn	2001	
Ballypalady	Yes	Yes		1.62	4.01	Antrim	2005	
Ballyquintin Point NNR040	Yes	Yes		n/a	n/a	Ards	1987^{[B]}	
Ballyquintin Point ASSI087	Yes	Yes		29.99	74.1	Ards	1995	
Ballyrisk More	?	?	?	5.25	12.97	Limavady	2007	
Ballysudden		Yes		39.58	97.8	Cookstown	1997	
Banagher	Yes			2.07	5.11	Fermanagh	2005	
Banagher Glen ASSI064	Yes			38.04	94	Limavady	1994	
Banagher Glen SAC023	Yes	Yes		35.52	87.77	Limavady	2005	
Banagher Glen NR015	Yes			n/a	n/a	Limavady	1974^{[B]}	
Bann Estuary SAC041	?	?	?	140.81	347.94	Coleraine	2005	
Bann Estuary ASSI208	Yes	Yes		140.81	347.94	Coleraine	2001	
Bardahessiagh		Yes		3.88	9.6	Cookstown	1996	
Beagh Big	Yes			0.53	1.3	Fermanagh	1988	
Belfast Lough RSAR006	Yes	Yes		174.88	432.14	Belfast; Carrickfergus; Newtownabbey; North Down	1998	
Belfast Lough SPA010	Yes	Yes		174.88	432.14	Belfast; Carrickfergus; Newtownabbey; North Down	1998	
Belfast Lough Open Water	Yes	Yes		n/a	n/a	n/a	2006	
Bellanaleck		Yes		0.38	0.93	Fermanagh	1996	
Belshaws Quarry		Yes		n/a	n/a	Lisburn	1972^{[B]}	
Benburb		Yes		1.21	3	Dungannon & South Tyrone	1995	
Binevenagh NNR041	Yes	Yes		n/a	n/a	Limavady	1987^{[B]}	
Binevenagh SAC039	?	?		36.74	90.79	Limavady	2005	
Binevenagh ASSI212	Yes	Yes		36.74	90.79	Limavady	2001	
Black Bog RSAR015	Yes			74.23	183.42	Omagh	1999	
Black Bog SAC002	Yes			74.23	183.42	Omagh	2005	
Black Bog ASSI007	Yes			78.51	194	Omagh	1987	
Black Burn	Yes	Yes		8.22	20.3	Larne	1997	
Black Lough ASSI239	Yes			2.62	6.47	Dungannon & South Tyrone	2004	
Black Lough ASSI154	Yes			18.03	44.55	Down	1998	
Bohill Forest	?	?	?	n/a	n/a	Down	1970^{[B]}	
Boho	Yes	Yes		5.77	14.25	Fermanagh	1999	
Bonds Glen	Yes			20.46	50.56	Derry City	2004	
Boorin	Yes	Yes		n/a	n/a	Strabane	1975^{[B]}	
Bovevagh		Yes		2.31	5.7	Limavady	1995	
Braade	Yes			1.17	2.9	Fermanagh	1996	
Brackagh Moss	Yes			n/a	n/a	Craigavon	1976^{[B]}	
Breen Forest	Yes	?		n/a	n/a	n/a	1970^{[B]}	
Breen Wood SAC024	Yes			14.57	36.01	n/a	2005	
Breen Wood ASSI161	Yes			14.57	36	Moyle	1997	
Burdautien Lough	Yes	Yes		2.63	6.5	Fermanagh	1995	
Caldanagh Bog	Yes			14.37	35.5	Ballymoney	1997	
Cam Lough	Yes			33.05	81.66	Newry & Mourne	2004	
Carlingford Lough SPA009	Yes	Yes		334.72	827.12	Newry & Mourne	1998	
Carlingford Lough RSAR005	?	?		n/a	n/a	Newry & Mourne	n/a	
Carn/Glenshane Pass ASSI167	Yes			784.6	1,938.78	Coleraine; Limavady; Magherafelt	2000	
Carn/Glenshane Pass SAC033	Yes	?		784.6	1,938.78	Coleraine; Limavady; Magherafelt	2005	
Carrickarede ASSI113	Yes	Yes	?	9.2	22.73	Coleraine	1997	
Carrickastickan	Yes			1.51	3.74	Newry & Mourne	2002	
Carrickbrawn	Yes			4.86	12	Fermanagh	1987	
Carrowcarlin	Yes			3.17	7.84	Down	1998	
Cashel Loughs	Yes			13.84	34.21	Newry & Mourne	1998	
Copeland Islands	Yes			81.55	201.52	Ards	2004	
Devenish Island			Yes	26	64.24	Fermanagh	2007	
Giant's Causeway and Dunseverick		Yes		91.59	226.33	Moyle	2000	
Whitespots		Yes		2.04	5.05	Ards	1999	

== Notes ==
^{A} Rounded to two decimal places.
^{B} As yet unconfirmed. Year displayed is year of declaration.
