= List of museums in Ireland =

List of museums in Ireland may refer to:

- List of museums in Northern Ireland
- List of museums in the Republic of Ireland
