= National nature reserve (United Kingdom) =

Nature reserve designation in the United Kingdom

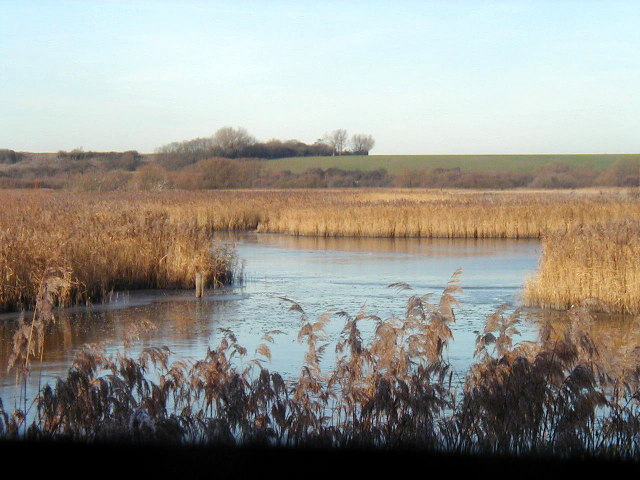
Stodmarsh, a National Nature Reserve in Kent

In the United Kingdom, a national nature reserve is a form of statutory nature reserve that has been designated as such by one of the three national nature conservation bodies of Great Britain. There are 229 designated sites in England, 43 in Scotland, and 76 in Wales. A similar designation, a "nature reserve", is used in Northern Ireland and those are designated by the Northern Ireland Environment Agency.

== Great Britain ==
In Great Britain, nature reserves designed under Part III of the National Parks and Access to the Countryside Act 1949 that are deemed to be of national importance may be designated as statutory 'national nature reserves' by the relevant national nature conservation body (Natural England, Scottish Natural Heritage, or Natural Resources Wales) using section 35(1) of the Wildlife and Countryside Act 1981.

If a nature reserve is designated by a local authority in Great Britain, then the resulting statutory nature reserve will be referred to as a local nature reserve.

=== England ===
In England, 229 national nature reserves are designated by Natural England.

=== Scotland ===
In Scotland, 43 national nature reserves are designated by NatureScot.

=== Wales ===
In Wales, 76 national nature reserves are designated by Natural Resources Wales.

== Northern Ireland ==
In Northern Ireland, statutory nature reserves are designated by the Northern Ireland Environment Agency under the Nature Conservation and Amenity Lands (Northern Ireland) Order 1985. There are 47 NRs in Northern Ireland.

== See also ==
- Nature reserve
- National nature reserve
- Local nature reserve
