= Banagher, County Londonderry =

Parish in County Londonderry, Northern Ireland

Coordinates: 54.8816°N 6.92248°W

Banagher: Irish: Beannchar
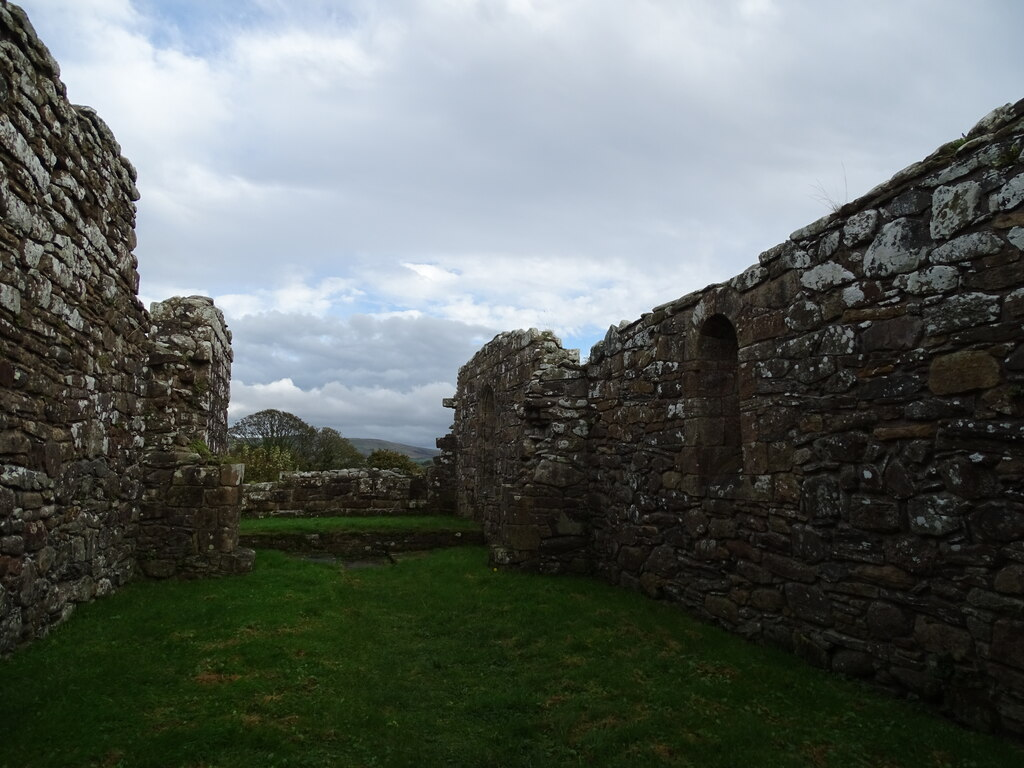
- Banagher Old Church

- Location within Northern Ireland
- District: Causeway Coast and Glens
- County: County Londonderry
- Country: Northern Ireland
- Sovereign state: United Kingdom
- Post town: LONDONDERRY
- Postcode district: BT47
- Dialling code: 028
- Police: Northern Ireland
- Fire: Northern Ireland
- Ambulance: Northern Ireland
- UK Parliament: East Londonderry

Banagher (pronounced /ˈbænəhər/ BAN-ə-hər, from Irish Beannchar) is a parish in County Londonderry, Northern Ireland. The parish is made up of the medieval parish of Banagher and parts of the ancient parish of Boveva and the townland of Tireighter and Park, once in the parish of Cumber. Banagher has many ancient monuments, including churches, holy wells, standing stones and chambered graves.

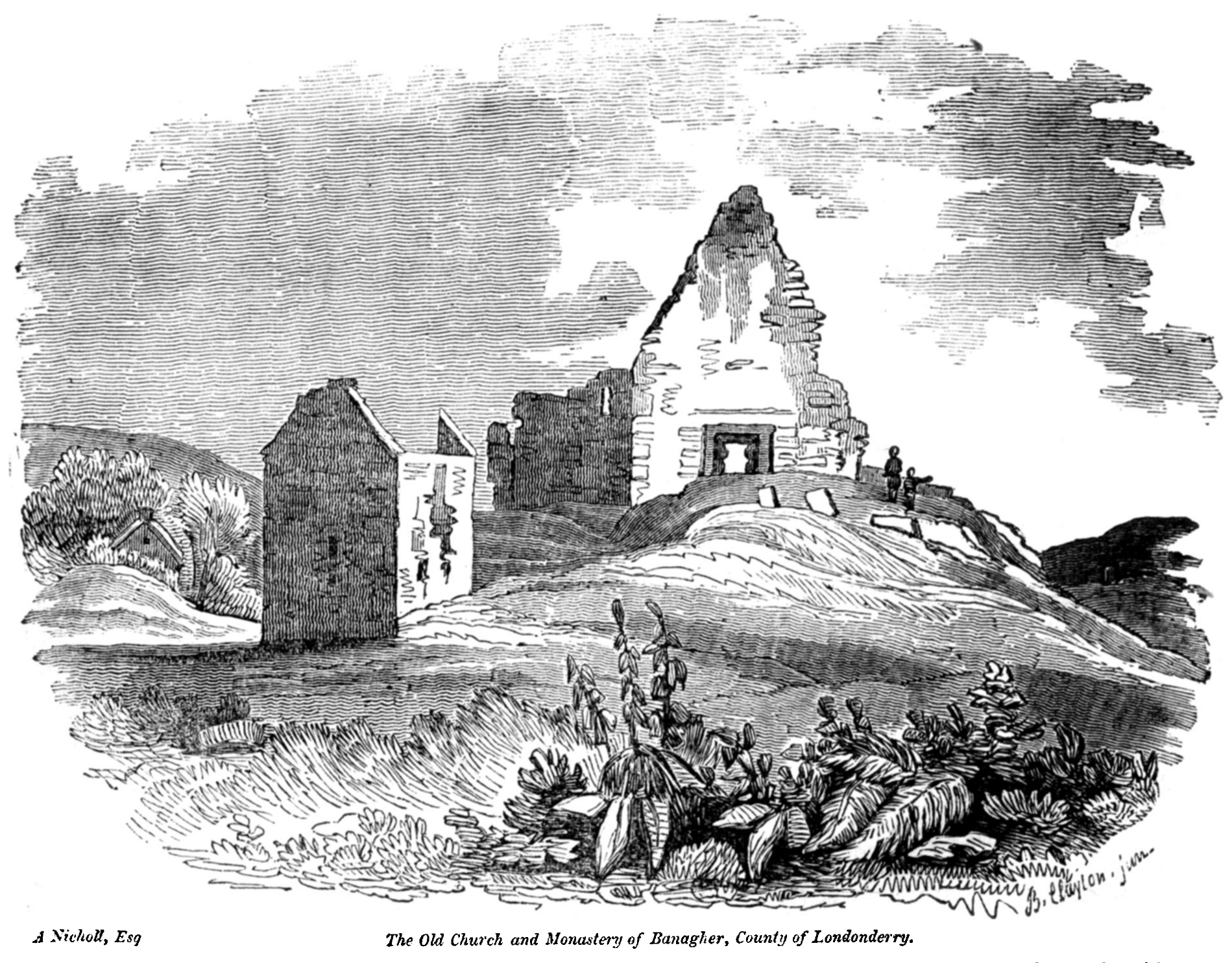
Ruins of the Old Church of Banagher, County Londonderry, in 1833

== Geography ==
Banagher lies in the western foothills of the Sperrin Mountains, between the rivers Roe and Faughan. The landscape is mostly rugged, with glens and narrow valleys rising into the highlands. Banagher Glen is a good example of the area's terrain and forms an important conservation area, preserving one of the few surviving examples of old-growth deciduous woodland in Ireland. The Glen has a trail which climbs through the woods to Altnaheglish Dam and Reservoir, which supplies water to Derry. The path up to the dam from the valley floor climbs through deciduous woodland and higher coniferous woodland to moor and heathland. Rare red squirrels can be spotted foraging for acorns. Banagher Glen is a protected nature reserve managed for conservation. It contains some of the last native oak woodland in the Sperrin region, with trees like oak, ash, rowan and hazel and a rich understorey. The glen supports a variety of wildlife; visitors may see buzzards, dragonflies and even red squirrels and stoats. The old limestone quarry in Banagher Glen is designated an ASSI (Area of Special Scientific Interest) for its unique geology.

=== Climate ===
Climate data for Banagher, Caugh Hill (1991–2020 normals, extremes 1969-present)
Month	Jan	Feb	Mar	Apr	May	Jun	Jul	Aug	Sep	Oct	Nov	Dec	Year
Record high °C (°F)	13.2 (55.8)	15.9 (60.6)	19.8 (67.6)	23.0 (73.4)	24.3 (75.7)	29.0 (84.2)	29.1 (84.4)	27.0 (80.6)	26.7 (80.1)	21.4 (70.5)	16.4 (61.5)	15.3 (59.5)	29.1 (84.4)
Mean daily maximum °C (°F)	6.4 (43.5)	6.9 (44.4)	8.7 (47.7)	11.2 (52.2)	14.1 (57.4)	16.4 (61.5)	17.8 (64.0)	17.5 (63.5)	15.5 (59.9)	11.9 (53.4)	8.7 (47.7)	6.8 (44.2)	11.8 (53.2)
Daily mean °C (°F)	4.0 (39.2)	4.2 (39.6)	5.6 (42.1)	7.6 (45.7)	10.1 (50.2)	12.7 (54.9)	14.3 (57.7)	14.1 (57.4)	12.2 (54.0)	9.2 (48.6)	6.3 (43.3)	4.4 (39.9)	8.7 (47.7)
Mean daily minimum °C (°F)	1.7 (35.1)	1.6 (34.9)	2.5 (36.5)	4.0 (39.2)	6.2 (43.2)	8.9 (48.0)	10.7 (51.3)	10.6 (51.1)	9.0 (48.2)	6.4 (43.5)	3.9 (39.0)	2.0 (35.6)	5.7 (42.3)
Record low °C (°F)	−12.0 (10.4)	−8.5 (16.7)	−6.5 (20.3)	−5.0 (23.0)	−4.0 (24.8)	0.2 (32.4)	3.5 (38.3)	2.0 (35.6)	−1.5 (29.3)	−4.5 (23.9)	−6.7 (19.9)	−8.5 (16.7)	−12.0 (10.4)
Average precipitation mm (inches)	146.9 (5.78)	118.4 (4.66)	105.9 (4.17)	90.6 (3.57)	85.7 (3.37)	86.6 (3.41)	91.3 (3.59)	106.8 (4.20)	98.5 (3.88)	130.7 (5.15)	151.1 (5.95)	154.2 (6.07)	1,366.8 (53.81)
Average precipitation days (≥ 1.0 mm)	19.5	17.1	16.8	14.6	14.6	13.8	15.5	16.7	15.8	17.2	20.4	19.5	201.7
Mean monthly sunshine hours	25.8	54.0	92.6	140.3	165.1	129.3	114.2	124.3	109.4	75.9	35.8	29.3	1,096.2
Source 1: Met Office
Source 2: Starlings Roost Weather

== History ==
It is clear from the Annals of Ulster that there was a church at Banagher in 1121. In that year it is recorded that Giolla Easpaig Eoghain O hAindiaraidh (English: Gillespie Owen O'Henry), king of Keenaght, was killed by kinsmen in the Banagher cemetery. His name means 'servant of Bishop Eoghan', apparently a reference to St Eugene, Bishop of Ardstraw.

On a sandy ridge by the River Owenreagh are the ruins of the old church and of a small square building sometimes called 'the abbey', with sharply pointed gables which once supported a stone roof. The church had a nave and chancel, but little remains of it. In the nearby cemetery is an ancient cross and a monument to St Muriedhach O'Heney, who is said to have founded the church and to have been abbot of the building next to it, and on one side of this is an effigy of him. However, St Muriedhach O'Heney appears in no calendar of saints. According to local legend, St Muriedhach was led to the site of his church by a stag which carried his book on its antlers, acting as a movable lectern.

The Earl-Bishop, who paid for a Banagher church spire

Beside the remains of the ancient church is the hole from which sand called 'Banagher sand' is drawn, long believed to give good luck to race horses when thrown over them.

There were also ruins of ancient churches at Straid and Templemoile, and the parish had a vitrified fort, on which by tradition fires were lit at Midsummer. Near the parish church is a large man-made cave.

At the time of the Plantation of Ulster in the seventeenth century, some townships of Banagher, including Ballyhanedin, were granted by the Crown to the Worshipful Company of Fishmongers of the City of London, and others to the Worshipful Company of Skinners. Banagher became a distinct Presbyterian congregation about 1753, and its first minister was John Law who was ordained in 1756.

The 18th century Church of Ireland church at Banagher, with a tower and octagonal spire, is on a rise in the ground and was built in 1782. The spire was paid for by Frederick Hervey, 4th Earl of Bristol, then Bishop of Derry, who was responsible for the construction of the famous Mussenden Temple. A Presbyterian meeting house at Ballyhanedin, in the Classical Greek style, was built by the Fishmongers' Company.

As early as 1837, there were parish schools for boys and girls at Ballagh, at Tyrglassen (supported by the Fishmongers Company) and at Fincarn.

Church of Ireland records exist for the parish of Banagher from 1821 for baptisms, 1827 for marriages, and 1837 for burials.

Griffith's valuation of Ireland, completed in 1864, shows tenements in Aughlish, Ballyhanedin, Carnanbane, Coolnamonan, Derrychrier, Drumcovit, Feeny, Fincarn, Finglen, Gallany, Killunaght, Knockan, Magheramore, Rallagh, Tamnyagan, Teeavan, Templemoyle, Tirglassan, and Umrycam.

== Industry ==
Today Banagher is predominantly rural. Agriculture, including farms and livestock, remains the principal local industry, and some residents work in construction-related trades such as plastering and drylining. The area lies above a limestone quarry (Banagher Glen Quarry), which historically supplied building stone but is now inactive, and the surrounding Banagher Glen is recognised for its ecological and geological interest.

In the 19th century, there was a large bleach-green at Knockan, where eight thousand pieces of linen were bleached and finished every year for the English markets. Some linen cloth was also woven by local farmers in their own houses.

== Places of worship ==
There are Roman Catholic, Church of Ireland and Presbyterian churches in the parish. The Presbyterian Church at Banagher supports the work of the Church at home and overseas and also has a Boys' Brigade. There are Catholic churches at Fincairn, Altinure, and Ballymonie, where Mass is celebrated every morning on week days and in the evenings on Sundays.

== Sport ==
The Banagher GAC (in full, the St Mary's Banagher GAC, and in Irish CLG Naomh Mhuire Beannchar) is a Gaelic Athletic Association club. Notable members include Seán Marty Lockhart, an All Star Derry footballer.

== Census 2001 ==
Banagher is classified by the NI Statistics and Research Agency (NISRA) as being within Derry Urban Area (DUA). Banagher is classified by the Northern Ireland Statistics and Research Agency (NISRA) as being within the Derry Urban Area (DUA). At the 2021 Census, the Derry Urban Area had a population of approximately 94,300 people. Of these, around 21.1% were aged under 16 years and 15.6% were aged 65 years and over. In terms of religion, approximately 78% of residents identified as Catholic, while about 17% identified as Protestant or other Christian denominations, with the remainder reporting other religions or no religion. The unemployment rate among residents aged 16–74 in 2021 was approximately 3.5%.

For more details see: NI Neighbourhood Information Service

== Index of Deprivation ==
According to the Northern Ireland Multiple Deprivation Measure (NIMDM) of 2005, of 582 wards in Northern Ireland, Banagher was ranked as the 205th most deprived. For more details see: NI Neighbourhood Information Service.

== See also ==
- List of villages in Northern Ireland
- List of civil parishes of County Londonderry
