= Forest service =

Forest Service may refer to:

- Canadian Forest Service
- Indian Forest Service
- Korea Forest Service
- New Zealand Forest Service
- United States Forest Service
- Forestry Commission in the United Kingdom
  - Forest Service Northern Ireland
