= Drumkeeragh Forest =

Forest in County Down, Northern Ireland

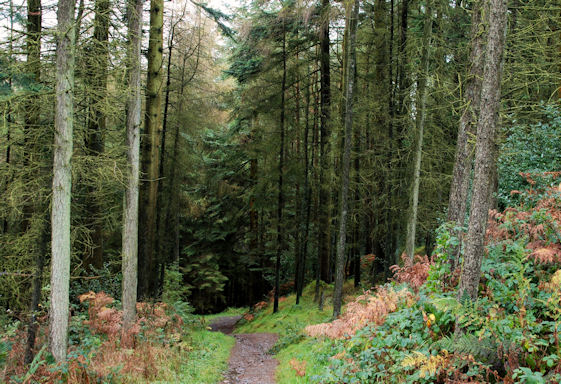

- Location within Northern Ireland
- Interactive map of Drumkeeragh Forest

Geography
- Location: Down, Northern Ireland, United Kingdom
- Coordinates: 54°21′06″N 5°56′45″W
- Elevation: 190 metres (620 ft) to 310 metres (1,020 ft)
- Area: 179.81 hectares (444.3 acres)

Administration
- Authority: Forest Service Northern Ireland

Drumkeeragh Forest is a mixed coniferous forest located on the lower slopes of Slieve Croob, near Ballynahinch, Northern Ireland. It is used for commercial felling and is managed by the Forest Service Northern Ireland.

The forest is predominantly made up of sitka spruce but Norway spruce, western red cedar, European larch, Douglas fir, noble fir, and Scots, lodgepole and Corsican pines are also found there. The trees are felled for timber, with cleared sections rotating every 50 years. The high elevation (190 metres (620 ft) to 310 metres (1,020 ft)) and poor soil mean that deciduous trees used to produce timber can not grow in the forest.

In the cleared areas, replanting has been carried out with wildlife conservation and landscaping in mind. Some of the replanted trees have included mountain ash and silver birch, both native broadleaf trees, which has led to a wider variety of birds in these areas.

== Access ==
The forest can be accessed from Drumnaquoile Road where there is a small car park. There are many gravel roads through the forest. Slieve Views of Slieve Croob on the left to the Antrim Hills may be had. From places within the forest Strangford Lough and Scrabo Tower can also be seen.

== Connection to crimes ==
Drumkeeragh Forest was the scene of the death of Penny McAllister. On 27 March 1991 McAllister had her throat slit by her husband's lover, Susan Christie, while they walked together in the woods. Christie originally claimed that a "wild bearded man" attacked them both but she was later convicted of manslaughter.

On 20 December 2004 Karen McMullan was left at Drumkeeragh forest, along with a burnt out car, after being held hostage for more than 24 hours. The kidnapping was part of the robbery of Northern Bank headquarters in Belfast, where her husband worked.
