= Assisi Animal Sanctuary =

Animal welfare charity in Northern Ireland

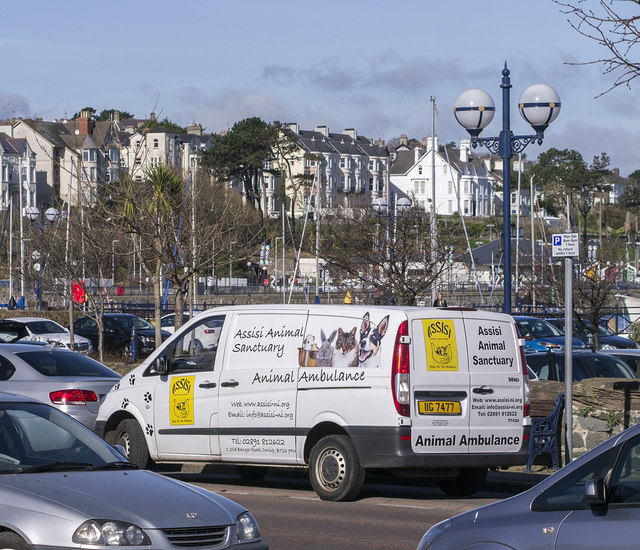
- Assisi Animal Sanctuary ambulance parked in Bangor, County Down
- Formation: 1995; 31 years ago
- Founded at: Conlig, County Down, Northern Ireland
- Type: Nonprofit
- Purpose: Animal welfare
- Funding: Public donations
- Website: www.assisi-ni.org

Assisi Animal Sanctuary in Conlig, County Down, is Northern Ireland's largest independent animal welfare charity. It shelters up to 200 companion animals at any given time. These have included dogs, puppies, cats, kittens, rabbits and guinea pigs. Several hamsters are permanent residents, and have been included in the center's animal welfare education program.

== History ==
The sanctuary was founded in 1995 at the former USPCA site in Conlig. Since its formation, it has practiced a "no kill" policy.

== Activities ==
The Assisi Animal Sanctuary has five main goals - providing sanctuary, finding homes for its animals, promoting animal welfare through its education program, rescuing animals at risk of death through its COAL program and fundraising to raise money to care for its animals.

=== Sanctuary ===
At any one time, Assisi cares for up to 200 companion animals. The sanctuary provides a refuge for injured, badly treated, abandoned and unwanted domestic animals.

=== Re-homing ===
Members of the public discuss their home environment with trained animal welfare specialists before being introduced to animals that may suit them. In most cases a home assessment is carried out before re-homing an animal. Assisi also has a follow-up process for each of its animals and retains the right to reclaim any if care is not as expected.

=== Education Program ===
The Assisi education program visits local schools and other groups throughout the year to inform about the principles of animal welfare.

=== Chance of a Lifetime (COAL) ===
The Assisi Chance of a Lifetime project was established in 2003 with a focus on dogs in Northern Ireland's pounds. COAL has so far rescued over 10,000 dogs, and every week, Assisi continues collect from council pounds and sanctuaries throughout Northern Ireland. These dogs are then transferred to sanctuaries in England, where there are more opportunities to find them new homes.

The dogs are transported in a specially designed, air-conditioned ambulance, which is fitted out with 20 kennels and driven by volunteer drivers. The road trip to Dogs Trust re-homing centres in Kenilworth or Evesham in central England is 800 miles. Both the purchase of the ambulance and the ongoing running costs are funded by Assisi through public donations.

=== Fundraising activities ===
Since Assisi receives no government support, it relies on public donations to run both its sanctuary and its COAL program. Throughout the year, Assisi organizes fundraising events and encourages volunteer participation in all of its programs.
