= Narrow Water Forest =

Forest in County Down, Northern Ireland

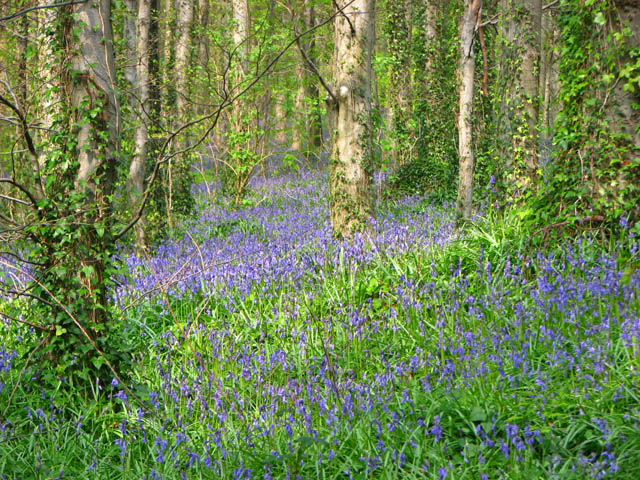
- Bluebells in Narrow Water Forest

- Location within Northern Ireland
- Interactive map of Narrow Water Forest

Geography
- Location: Down, Northern Ireland, United Kingdom
- Coordinates: 54°6′41.45″N 6°16′43.62″W
- Area: 342.04 acres (138.42 ha)

Administration
- Authority: Forest Service Northern Ireland

Narrow Water Forest is a mixed broadleaf and coniferous forest located between Newry and Warrenpoint, County Down, Northern Ireland. It is 342.04 acres (138.42 ha) in size, of which 138.41 acres (56.01 ha) is controlled by the Forest Service Northern Ireland.
