= Ballysallagh Forest =

Forest in Northern Ireland

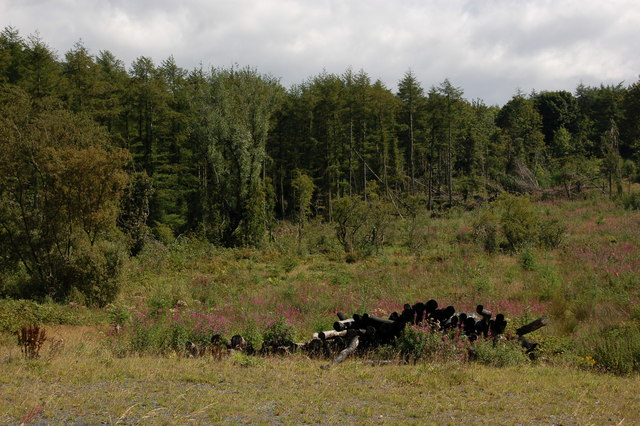

- Location within Northern Ireland
- Interactive map of Ballysallagh Forest

Geography
- Location: Down, Northern Ireland, United Kingdom
- Coordinates: 54°37′20″N 5°45′31″W
- Area: 127.49 hectares (315.0 acres)

Administration
- Authority: Forest Service Northern Ireland

Ballysallagh Forest is a predominantly coniferous forest located near Bangor, Northern Ireland. It has a small section of broadleaved trees at Cairn Wood. The forest is managed by the Forest Service Northern Ireland.

In October 2014 more than 20 hectares (representing approximately 7000 trees) were felled in an attempt to control an outbreak of the tree disease Phytophthora ramorum. The affected area included Cairn Wood which is popular with walkers.
