= Nature reserves in Northern Ireland =

Nature reserves in Northern Ireland, are designated and maintained by the Northern Ireland Environment Agency.

There are 47 national nature reserves in Northern Ireland.

== County Antrim ==
- Belshaw's Quarry Nature Reserve, grid ref: J229 671
- Breen Oakwood Nature Reserve, grid ref: D125 338
- Giant's Causeway National Nature Reserve, grid ref: C954 453
- Glenariff Nature Reserve, grid ref: D210 205
- Kebble Nature Reserve, grid ref: D095 515
- Portrush Nature Reserve, grid ref: C856 412
- Randalstown Forest Nature Reserve, grid ref: J088 872
- Rea's Wood Nature Reserve, grid ref: J142 855
- Slieveanorra Nature Reserve, grid refs: D132 265, D135 265, D147 274 and D155 286.
- Straidkilly Nature Reserve, grid ref: D302 163

== County Armagh ==
- Brackagh Nature Reserve, grid ref: J019 507
- Oxford Island National Nature Reserve, grid ref: J053 616

== County Down ==
- Ballyquintin National Nature Reserve, grid ref: J621 458
- Bohill Nature Reserve, grid ref: J396 459
- Cloghy Rocks Nature Reserve, grid ref: J594 478
- The Dorn Nature Reserve, grid ref: J593 568
- Granagh Bay Nature Reserve, grid ref: J606 485
- Hollymount Forest National Nature Reserve, grid ref: J464 438
- Killard Nature Reserve, grid ref: J610 433
- Murlough National Nature Reserve, grid ref: J414 351
- North Strangford Lough National Nature Reserve, grid ref: J508 706
- Quoile Pondage Nature Reserve, grid ref: J49647
- Rostrevor Oakwood Nature Reserve, grid ref: J186 170
- Turmennan Fen Nature Reserve, grid ref: J485 503

== County Fermanagh ==
- Castle Archdale Islands Nature Reserve
- Castle Caldwell Nature Reserve, grid ref: H020 600
- Correl Glen Nature Reserve, grid ref: H075 545
- Hanging Rock and Rossaa Forest Nature Reserve, grid ref: H110 365
- Killykeeghan and Crossmurrin Nature Reserve, grid ref: H112 348
- Lough Naman Bog Nature Reserve, grid ref: H075 545
- Marble Arch Nature Reserve, grid ref: H123 350
- Reilly and Gole Woods Nature Reserve grid refs: H340 254 (Reilly) and H336 250 (Gole)
- Ross Lough Nature Reserve, grid ref: H143 467

== County Londonderry ==
- Altikeeragh Nature Reserve, grid ref: C730 316
- Ballymaclary Nature Reserve, grid ref: C700 365
- Ballynahone Nature Reserve, grid ref: H860 980
- Banagher Glen Nature Reserve, grid ref: C672 045
- Binevenagh Nature Reserve, grid ref: C685 309
- Lough Beg National Nature Reserve, grid ref: H975 960
- Magilligan Point Nature Reserve, grid ref: C660 390
- Roe Estuary Nature Reserve, grid ref: C635 295

== County Tyrone ==
- Annagarriff Nature Reserve, grid ref: H905 6610
- Boorin Nature Reserve, grid ref: H495 846
- Brookend Nature Reserve, grid ref: H948 725
- Killeter Nature Reserve, grid refs: H090 808 and H086 821
- Meenadoan Nature Reserve, grid ref: H244 718
- Mullenakill, grid ref: H893 610
- The Murrins Nature Reserve, grid ref: H565 783
- Lough Neagh Islands Nature Reserve

== See also ==
- National nature reserves in England
- National nature reserve (Scotland)
- National nature reserves in Wales
