= Hillsborough Forest =

Forest in Northern Ireland

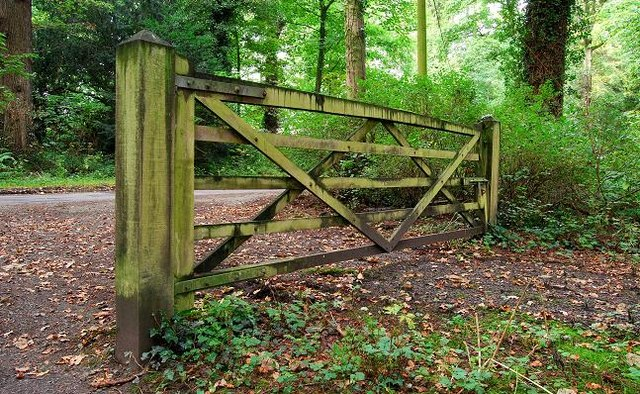

- Location within Northern Ireland
- Interactive map of Hillsborough Forest

Geography
- Location: Down, Northern Ireland, United Kingdom
- Coordinates: 54°27′31″N 6°04′21″W
- Area: 500 acres (200 ha)

Administration
- Authority: Forest Service Northern Ireland

Hillsborough Forest is a mixed broadleaf and coniferous forest located near the village of Hillsborough in County Down, Northern Ireland. It was once part of the Hillsborough Castle demesne. The lake located in the forest park contains brown trout and rainbow trout.

The forest contains the remains of the Fox Fort rath.

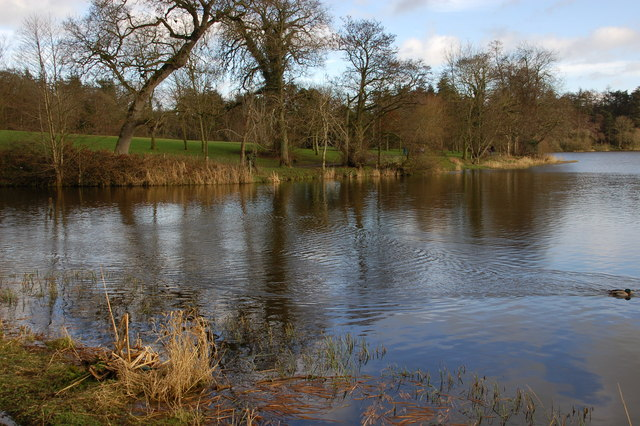
The lake, Hillsborough forest

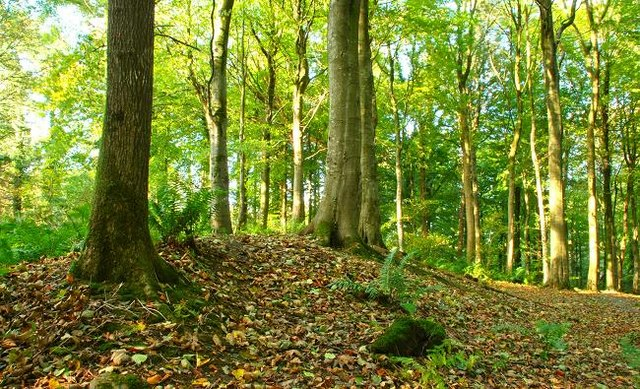
The earth bank shown is part of what remains of the rath
