= Ballyhanedin =

- townland
- Ballyhanedin shown within Northern Ireland Ballyhanedin (the United Kingdom)
- Coordinates: 54°54′18″N 7°03′00″W
- Sovereign state: United Kingdom
- Country: Northern Ireland
- County: Londonderry
- Barony: Tirkeeran
- Civil parish: Banagher
- Plantation grant: Fishmongers

Government
  - Council: Derry and Strabane Council

Area
  - Total: 1,038.7 acres (420.36 ha)

Ballyhanedin is a townland in the civil parish of Banagher in County Londonderry, Northern Ireland. It is located a 3km from the village of Feeny, and is situated within Causeway Coast and Glens district.

It lies on the A6 Belfast to Derry road. Although it is only a townland, Ballyhanedin has a boundary sign which shows where it begins.

== History ==
The townland was settled in the seventeenth century by the Worshipful Company of Fishmongers of the City of London. A report in the Company's archives reports a deputation which surveyed its Estates in 1820:

The Presbyterian Meeting Houses of Ballykelly and Ballyhanedin are both in so wretched a state of repair as to be scarce fit for the Celebration of Divine Worship, or safe for the Congregation to assemble in. They are full of hope that their good landlords will assist them to repair, but considering the probable expense and the bad construction of both buildings it will certainly be more admirable to rebuild.

The Court of the Fishmongers' Company decided to build two new Presbyterian Church meeting houses in the Classical Greek style, with dressings of Dungiven sandstone. The Court voted £2,200 for the building at Banagher, which was constructed over three years and opened in 1834.

An Ordnance Survey memoir of Banagher from the 1830s, says that the new meeting house was:

...situated in Ballyhanedin townland, on the road between Derry and Dungiven, one mile westward of Feeny, it was erected in 1825 by the Fishmongers’ Company, at an expense of £2,000. It is a handsome substantial building. The entrance is in the gable, which is surmounted by a heavy projecting roof in the form of a pediment. It is lighted by two windows on each side with round arches. It has no gallery and can accommodate a congregation of 550 persons.

Griffith's valuation of Ireland, completed in 1864, shows some thirty tenements in Ballyhanedin, including one occupied by the Reverend Robert Rogers. The other surnames of those then occupying property in the township were Allen, Brazil, Christie, Cole, Connor, Dogherty, Duddy, Evans, Hewston, Lyons, McClusky, McKeever, McLenihan, McLoughlin, Monteith, Mulfawl, Nutt, Rosborough (eight tenements), Sherrard, Simpson, Walker and Williams.

== Present day ==
Much of the townland is rural. Photographs of this area some miles out of Feeny are online at geograph.org.uk and include a windswept hill to the north of the junction of Ballyhanedin Road and Glenshane Road. Some of the fields have substantial drum-shaped stone gateposts, which are common in Northern Ireland.

As part of the Munreery Climbing Lane road scheme, completed in 2005 to improve the A6 Glenshane Road west of Dungiven, the former 'Bennett junction' at the Ballyhanedin crossroads, which dated from the 1960s, was replaced by a 'ghost island' layout.
