= Red Barn Gallery =

Coordinates: 54.6005°N 5.9299°W

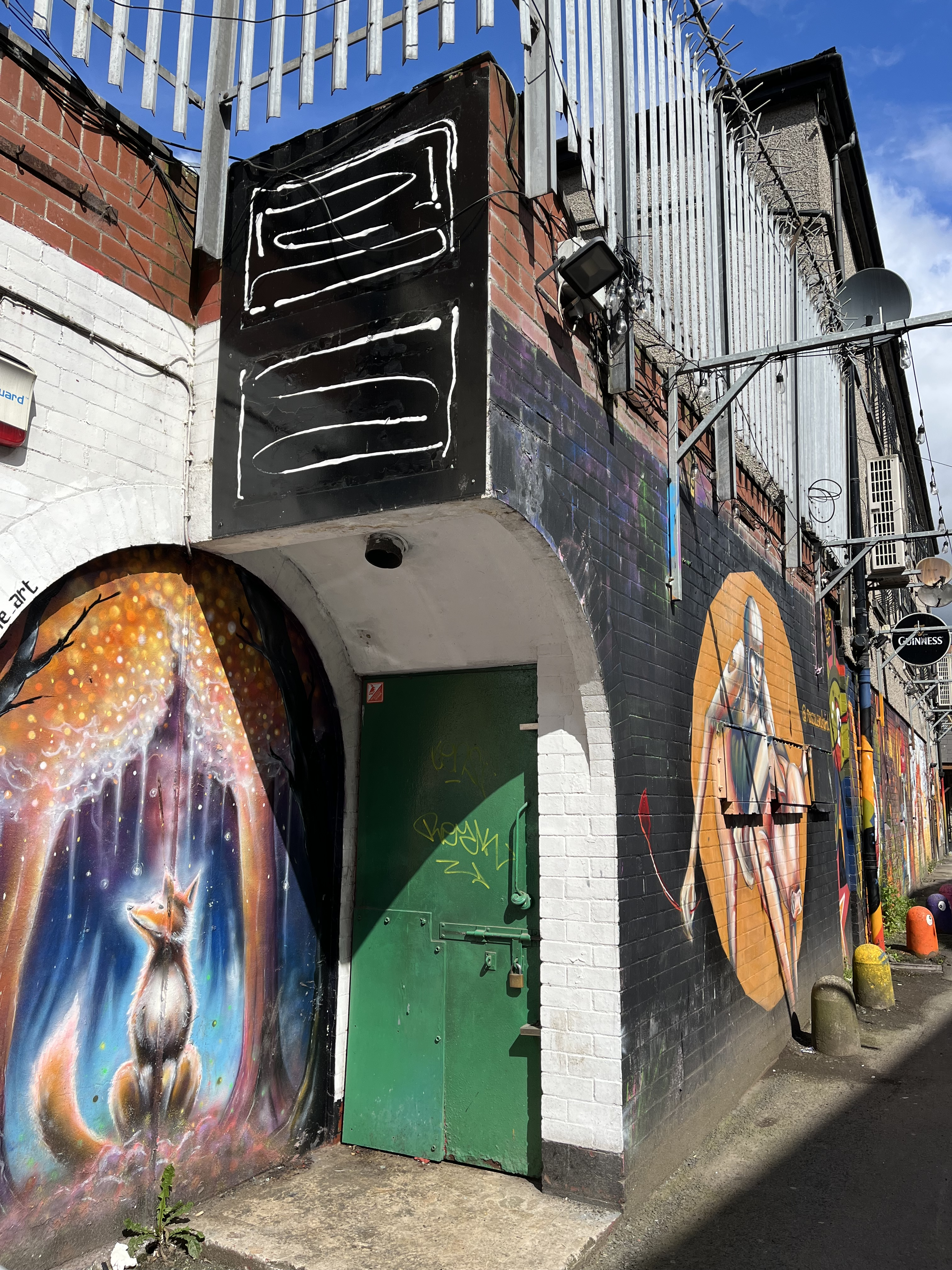
The Red Barn Gallery location

The Red Barn Gallery, or RBG Belfast, was a photography gallery and exhibition space in central Belfast, Northern Ireland, and the first there to be dedicated to film and analogue based exhibitions. It opened in 2008, but was not constituted as the RBG Arts Group until May 2009.

== History ==
The Red Barn Gallery was converted from a pub by photographer Frankie Quinn, who used a thousand litres of white paint for the job but kept some of the trappings of the pub. The pub was built on the site of and gets its name from an actual barn. After the pub closed in the early 80s, the premises were used as temporary storage space and as a warehouse, or lay empty.

== Aims ==
It was a not for profit photographic gallery dedicated to the advancement and provision of the photographic arts for public benefit. The gallery's website stated, "Our aim is to inspire and educate through exhibitions, projects and workshops with the objective of encouraging the appreciation and improvement of social documentary photography."

The gallery was dedicated to the traditional use of film and the principles of minimal post processing use of photo editing software and maintains a core ethos of photography captured in the camera and not heavily edited or altered on a computer.

== Notable exhibitions ==
- 802% above the Norm, photographs from socialist-era Poland by Henryk Makarewicz and Wiktor Pental, in May 2009.
- Bombay St: Taken from the Ashes, an exhibition by the Red Barn Gallery showing the after effects of the burning of Bombay Street on the night of 14–15 August 1969, attracted an unprecedented degree of public attention with over 7000 visitors. The exhibition displayed a collection of images that had stayed locked away by the photographer, Gerry Collins, for nearly 40 years.
- Frankie Quinn: XXV, a retrospective of the work of the gallery's director, Frankie Quinn, was shown in early 2010.
- Stefania Gurdowa: Negatives must be stored, an exhibition of photographic plates in the possession of Stefania Gurdowa, was shown in May 2010.
