= Aghadowey Wood =

Four separate woods and a forest Northern Ireland

Aghadowey Forest or Aghadowey Wood is a set of four separate woods and forest in County Londonderry, Northern Ireland.

== Origin and location ==
Aghadowey Forest was named for the local town lands, Scotch Cah, Irish Cah, and two areas called Ballycaghan. They are north of Garvagh. There are no formal buildings or facilities provided there; however, the public are allowed to visit and utilize the forest and woods. The area of the Aghadowey Forest is 209.88 ha or 518.62 acres.
