= Black Bog =

Bog in County Tyrone, Northern Ireland

Coordinates: 54°40′19″N 7°01′14″W

Designations

Ramsar Wetland
- Official name: Black Bog
- Designated: 28 July 2000
- Reference no.: 1032

Black Bog is a raised bog in County Tyrone, Northern Ireland, situated about 17km west of Cookstown.

== Features ==
=== Ramsar site ===
The Black Bog Ramsar site (wetlands of international importance designated under the Ramsar Convention), is 183.42 hectares in area. It lies at Latitude 54° 40' 21" N and Longitude 07° 01' 00" W, south of the C612 road (Blackbog Road) in Formil townland. It was designated a Ramsar site on 14 December 1999. It is a large and relatively intact example of a lowland raised bog.

=== Flora and fauna ===
The area is thickly covered by various Sphagnum species and exhibits an unusual plant community including Empetrum nigrum which locally also provides a high cover and Cladonia impexa in large hummocks. No noteworthy fauna has been reported.

== See also ==
- List of Ramsar sites in Northern Ireland
