= Banagher Glen =

Protected area in Northern Ireland

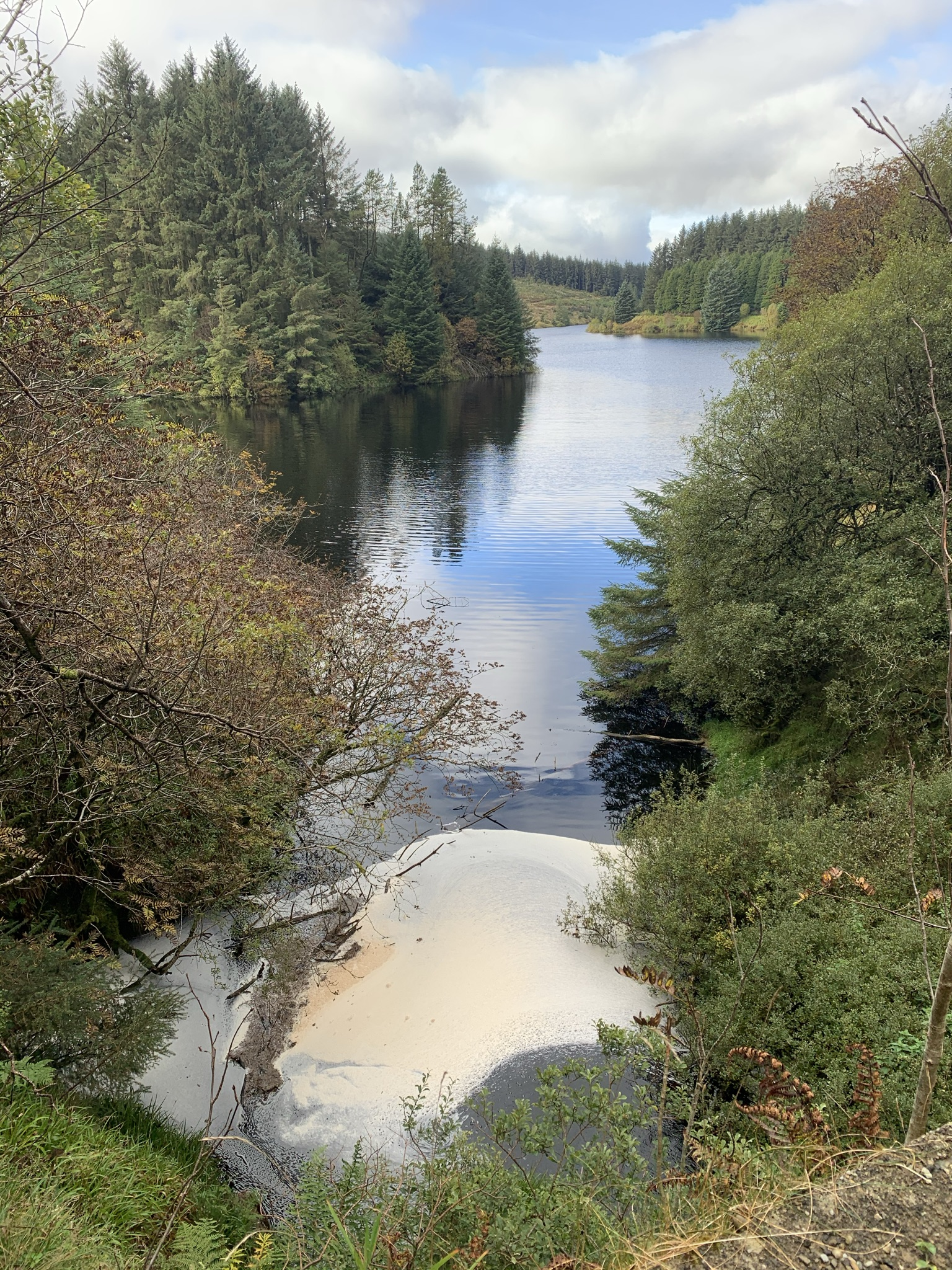
- Atlnaheglish Reservoir in Autumn

- Location within Northern Ireland
- Interactive map of Banagher Glen

Geography
- Location: Londonderry, Northern Ireland, United Kingdom
- Coordinates: 54°52′50″N 6°54′57″W

Administration
- Authority: Northern Ireland Environment Agency

Banagher Glen is a nature reserve and forest park south of Dungiven in County Londonderry, Northern Ireland.

It has been a National Nature Reserve since 1974 and is one of the largest and oldest ancient oak and ash woodlands in Ireland. It is also a Special Area of Conservation and the nature reserve is home to many native species of flora and fauna. In spring, bluebells cover much of the forest floor. The forest also provides an important habitat for butterflies and is home to many birds including the peregrine falcon and buzzards.

According to Irish mythology the 'last serpent in Ireland', Lig na Paiste, lived in the Owenrigh river in Banagher Glen. According to legend Saint Patrick had missed the creature when he'd chased the snakes out of Ireland a few years earlier. The serpent began terrorising the local population, and according to some versions of the myth could breathe fire. St. Murrough O’ Heaney, who had a church in the valley, managed to trick the serpent and caged him forever underneath Lough Foyle.

There are three trails that start from the Trailhead car park:

- Owenrigh River Trail - A 5km walk along the Owenrigh River.
- Reservoir Trail - A 6km trail to Banagher Dam and Altnaheglish Reservoir. The route is signposted and involves returning the same way.
- Forest Trail - A 11km looped trail which involves walking through Banagher Forest. The route is initially the same as the Reservoir Trail but is not signposted after the reservoir.

== Banagher Dam & Altnaheglish Reservoir ==
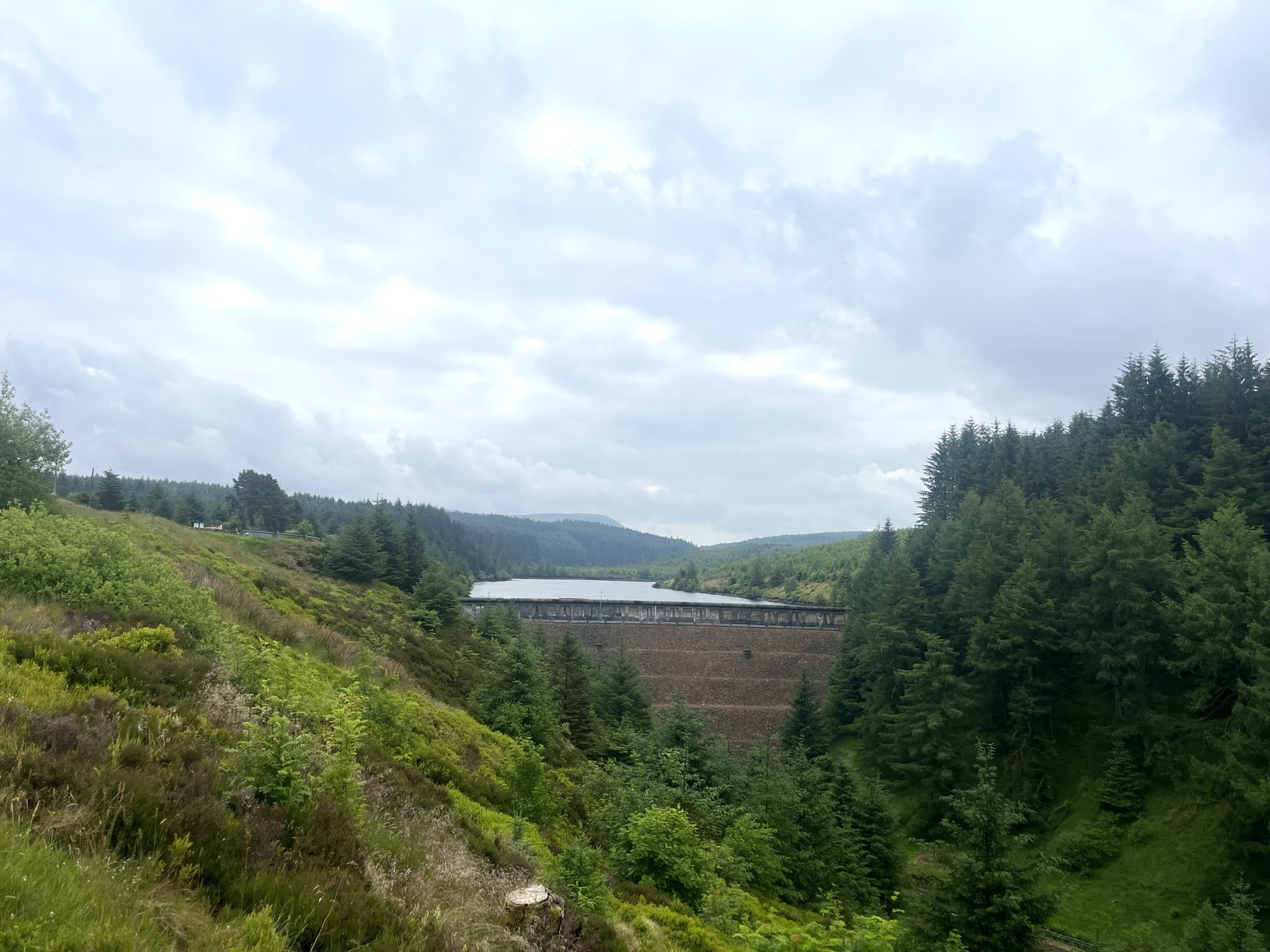
Banagher Dam and Altnagelish Reservoir

Over the course of the latter half of the 1800s, the growth of the shirt industry in Derry had put strain on the city's water supply. Over the years the Londonderry Corporation (which ran the city) had built three new reservoirs, but demand always outstripped supply soon after they were complete. After the dry summer of 1911 had caused a 'water famine', City Engineer Matthew Robinson proposed a more permanent solution.

Robinson proposed a huge new reservoir in Altnaheglish Valley to the city authority in 1915, with an estimated cost of £400,000 (roughly £33 million in 2023). Whilst the city balked at the cost, in 1918 the government provided the funding.

The dam was a feat of engineering, given the technology available at the time. It is 42m high, which makes it the tallest dam in Northern Ireland. The 32km pipe that transported water from the reservoir to Derry had to be dug with picks and shovels. The dam was complete in 1935 and opened in a ceremony with the Duke of Abercorn, Governor of Northern Ireland.

The reservoir has a capacity of 2.2 billion litres and a maximum depth of 28m. It can pipe up to 20.5 million litres of water a day.
