= Northern Ireland War Memorial =

Building in Belfast, Northern Ireland

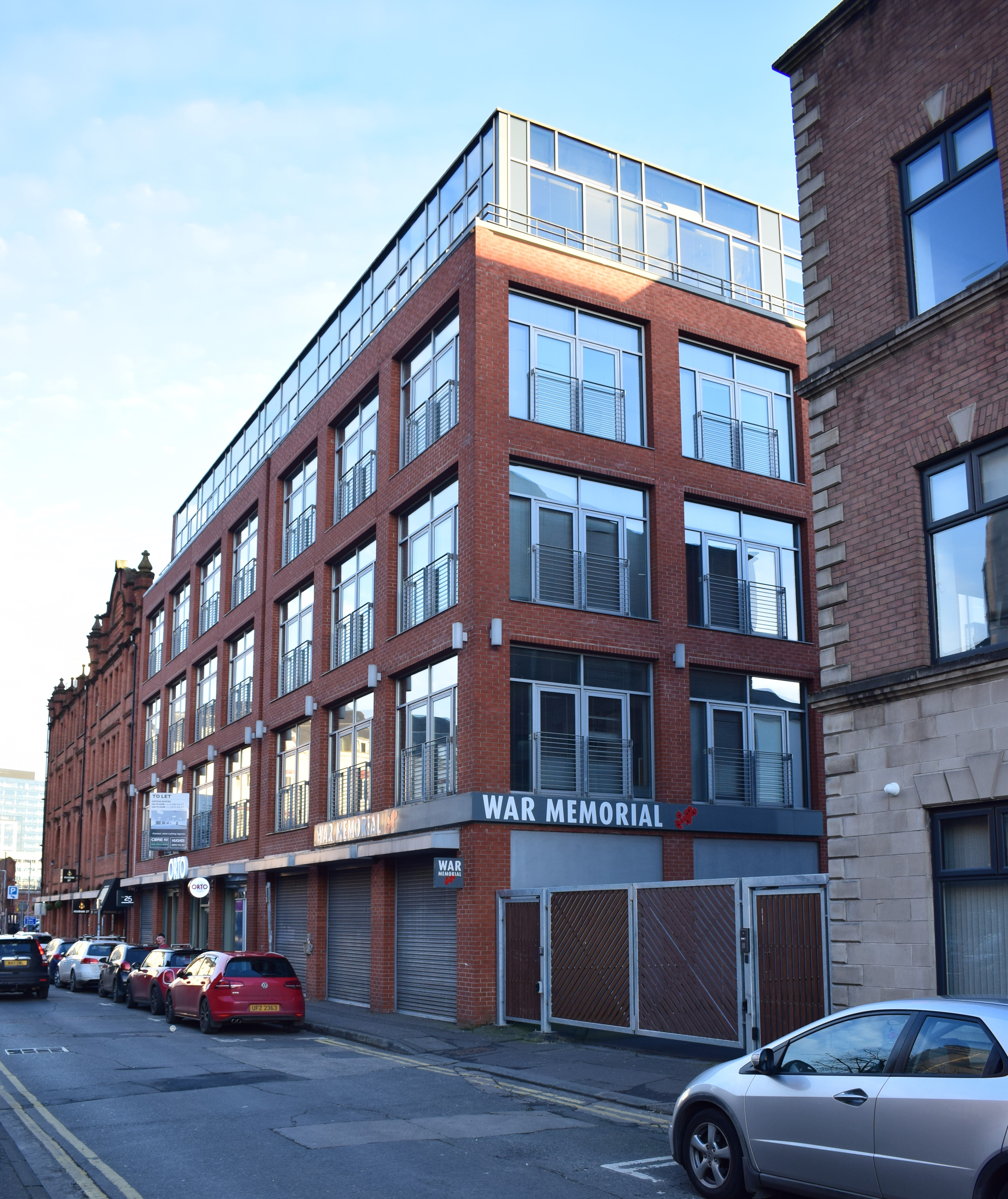

- Location within Greater Belfast
- Established: 2007; 19 years ago
- Location: 21 Talbot Street, Belfast, BT1 2LD; United Kingdom
- Coordinates: 54.602449°N 5.928071°W
- Website: www.niwarmemorial.org

The Northern Ireland War Memorial also called NI War Memorial and War Memorial was opened in 2007 in Talbot Street, Belfast, Northern Ireland. It replaced an earlier building called Memorial House which was located in Waring Street on a site which was bombed during the Blitz in 1941. It contains the Home Front Exhibition and the first national memorial to the hundreds killed in the Belfast blitz, created by Carolyn Mulholland.

== Vision ==
The vision is for an engaging and welcoming museum that provides a window on Northern Ireland's key role in the Second World War and the impact of the war on its people.

== Mission ==
The Northern Ireland War Memorial was established to provide an enduring memorial for the men and women of Northern Ireland who died in the two World Wars, and to commemorate the American presence in Northern Ireland during the Second World War.

== History ==
The Northern Ireland War Memorial began shortly after the conclusion of the Second World War, when the Northern Ireland branch of the British Legion wished to establish a War Memorial to those from Northern Ireland who had fallen in the First and Second World War. The Northern Irish Government, under Sir Basil Brooke, also wished to mark this sacrifice as well as the enduring bonds of friendship made with the estimated 300,000 members of the US forces who passed through Northern Ireland.

In 1948, efforts were combined and the Northern Ireland War Memorial Building Fund was established and the Council of the Northern Ireland War Memorial officially incorporated in 1950 with its first chairman appointed Sir Norman Stronge. The Northern Irish Government agreeing to match £ for £ all money raised up to £100,000 while the Belfast Corporation, a forerunner to Belfast City Council, were to provide a suitable site for the building.

Fundraising events were held across Northern Ireland, centrally controlled from NIWM's tramcar offices in 'Blitz Square' on High Street in Belfast. These offices were three converted tramcars joined end-to-end to create an office space, opened on 16 November 1948 by Sir Basil Brooke. Fundraising events included Ladies International Football games and the creation of a two-tonne fruit cake which was raffled off in large slices to winning ticket holders.

After nearly ten years, work began on the Northern Ireland War Memorial Building (also known as Memorial House) when a site was secured in Waring Street Belfast. 5-21 Waring Street had housed a number of commercial enterprises before being destroyed on 4/5 May 1941 during the Belfast Blitz Fire Raid. Memorial House was finally completed and opened in October 1963 by HM Elizabeth, the Queen Mother. At this event she stated;

Your Memorial is not merely a building of brick and stone. It will be a fitting home for the British Legion and many other ex-service organisations and welfare bodies whose work is as valuable today as in the dark days of war.

Throughout the period known as the Northern Irish 'Troubles' Memorial House remained open to the public for ex-service events and charities, hosting various organisations and activities including Belfast Small Claims Court as well as services for the Church of God NI. In the late eighties it was decided to establish a Home Front Heritage Centre, designed to educate the public on Northern Ireland's unique role during the Second World War. This Heritage Centre opened in 1989 and continued to operate until 2007 when Memorial House was sold and all operations moved to its current Talbot Street location.

Now an Accredited Museum, their mission is to tell the story of Northern Ireland's role in the Second World War comprehensively and authentically through exhibitions, publications, research, outreach and accessible learning programmes. In addition, they maintain war memorials to the fallen in the First and Second World War and the Belfast Blitz. It organises respectful commemorations, provides office and meeting accommodation to ex-service charities, and awards small grants to projects which are in line with their charitable objectives.

== See also ==
- Somme Heritage Centre
- The Cenotaph, Belfast
- List of public art in Belfast
