= Roe Estuary Nature Reserve =

Protected area in Northern Ireland

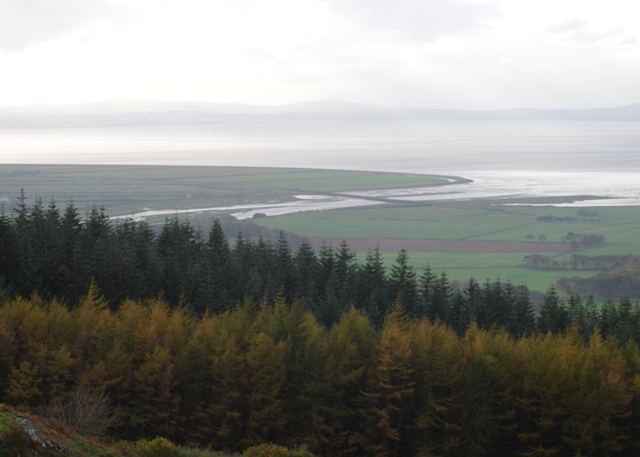
- A view of Roe Estuary Nature Reserve from Binevenagh looking across the Magilligan plain showing Lough Foyle in the distance

- Location within Northern Ireland
- Location: County Londonderry, Northern Ireland
- Coordinates: 55°06′23.7″N 6°59′16.7″W

Roe Estuary Nature Reserve is a protected area in Aghanloo, County Londonderry, Northern Ireland. It is located at the southeast bank of Lough Foyle at the mouth of the River Roe, roughly 6 km north of the market town of Limavady. The estuary is home to numerous migrating bird species. Wading birds as well as ducks, swans and geese are also found in this area. Species of birds include the curlew, lapwing turnstone, bar-tailed godwit and brent goose. In this area of salt marsh and mudflats live small marine animals such as mussels, periwinkles, lugworms, shrimps, and ragworms. There are large areas of eel grass. Salmon pass through this estuary for access between the River Roe and Lough Foyle. Otters have also been sighted in this estuary.

The Coleraine–Portrush railway line crosses the estuary going from Derry~Londonderry railway station in Derry to Coleraine railway station further north.
