= Somme Heritage Centre =

Military museum in Northern Ireland

Coordinates: 54.609°N 5.681°W

The Somme Heritage Centre is a tourist attraction and education centre in Conlig, County Down, Northern Ireland. Opened in 1994 the centre promotes Ireland's role in the First World War, and especially the role of both Protestant and Catholic, unionist and nationalist in the war. It focuses on three of the volunteer divisions in Ireland;

- 10th (Irish) Division
- 16th (Irish) Division
- 36th (Ulster) Division

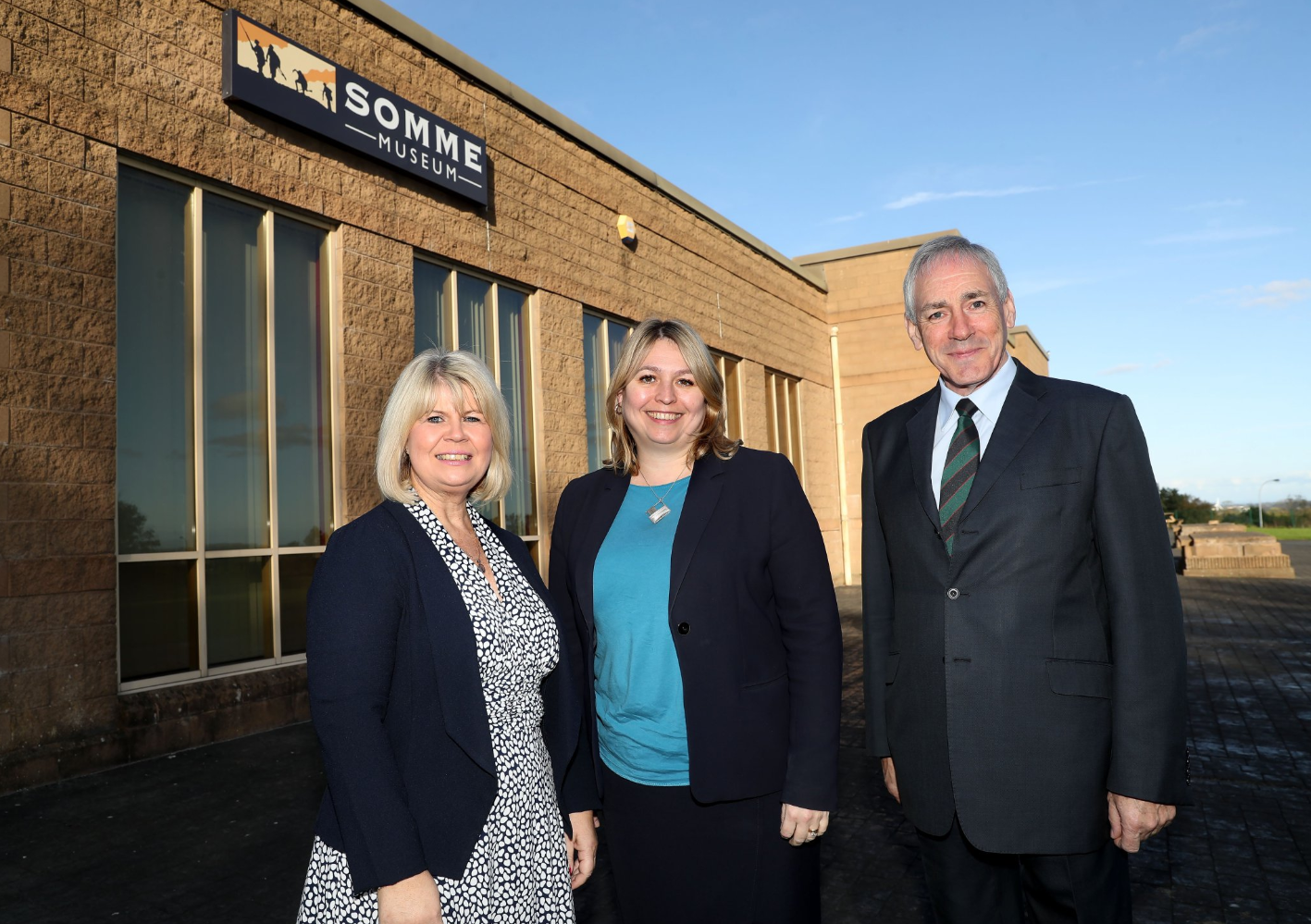

== See also ==
- Northern Ireland War Memorial
- The Cenotaph, Belfast
