= Annalong Forest =

Forest in County Down, Northern Ireland

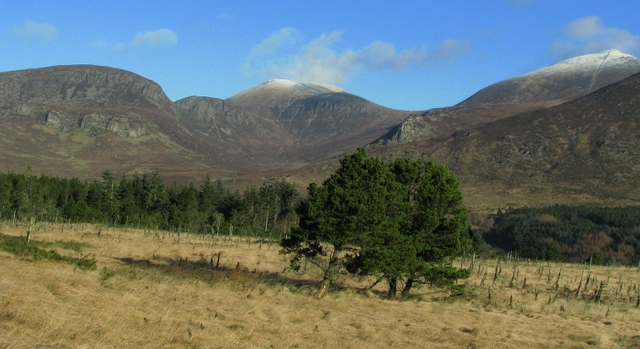
- Annalong Wood with the Mourne Mountains in the background

- Location within Northern Ireland
- Interactive map of Annalong Forest

Geography
- Location: Down, Northern Ireland, United Kingdom
- Coordinates: 54°08′38″N 5°56′24″W
- Area: 303.42 hectares (749.8 acres)

Administration
- Authority: Northern Ireland Water

Annalong Forest is located near the village of Annalong in County Down, Northern Ireland. It is made up of two sections: Annalong Wood and Silent Valley. The forest consists of various species of conifer. It is part of the Mourne Area of Outstanding Natural Beauty. It has been the site of two major fires, in 2010 and 2011.

== Access ==
Annalong Forest is located near the village of Annalong in County Down, Northern Ireland. It is made up of two sections: Annalong Wood and Silent Valley, which runs along the Silent Valley reservoir. The forest consists of various species of conifer, and is managed by the Northern Irish Forest Service. It is part of the Mourne Area of Outstanding Natural Beauty.

== Fires ==
There have been two major forest fires in the area since 2010. One, which started on 30 April 2011, required 10 fire engines to extinguish and caused the temporary closure of several roads. Another, on 24 April 2010, destroyed approximately 50 hectares of gorse and was believed to have been started deliberately.
