= Conlig =

Village in County Down, Northern Ireland

Coordinates: 54.628°N 5.678°W

Conlig: Irish: An Choinleac
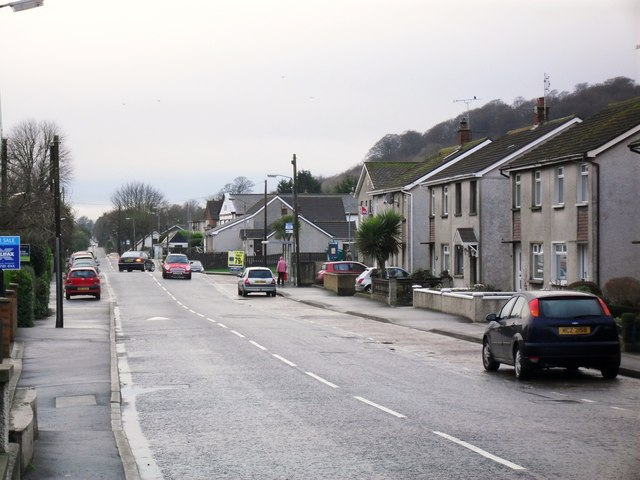
- Main Street

- Location within County Down
- District: Ards and North Down Borough
- County: County Down
- Country: Northern Ireland
- Sovereign state: United Kingdom
- Post town: NEWTOWNARDS
- Postcode district: BT23
- Dialling code: 028
- UK Parliament: North Down
- NI Assembly: North Down

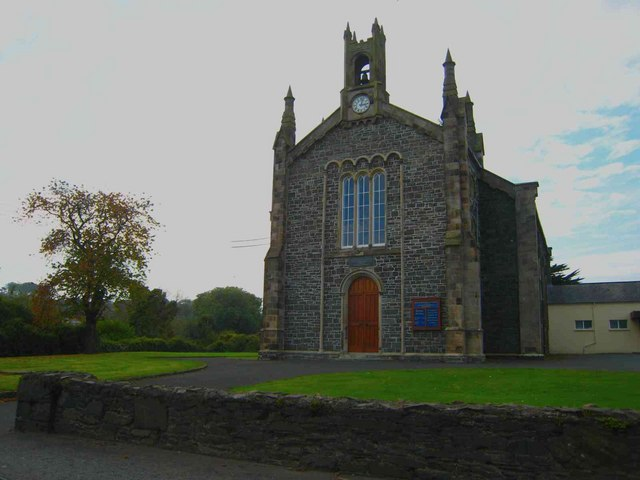
Conlig Presbyterian Church

Conlig (Irish: An Choinleac, meaning 'the hound-flagstone') is a village and townland in County Down in Northern Ireland. It is considered a suburb of Bangor.

== Mining ==
The area includes extant ancient copper mines. Weapons forged with the copper from this mine have been found across Europe, and was traded for tin from Cornwall during the Bronze Age. Copper mining in the area declined, though the site at Whitespots in the village subsequently became one of the most important sources for minerals in the United Kingdom during the 19th century. At this time, the mines were the largest such complex in Ireland, and produced around 13,500 tonnes of lead between the late 17th century until the end of the 19th century, making it one of the major lead mines of the British Isles during that time. Production stopped in 1900, after a decline from 1854.

The area contains the only known occurrence of the mineral harmotome in Northern Ireland.

Much of the area has been developed by the Department of Environment (DoE) as a country park, and the site can be accessed via the Somme Heritage Centre's car park.

Whitespots has been designated an Area of Special Scientific Interest (ASSI) by the DoE in 1998.

== Places of interest ==
- Somme Heritage Centre
- Clandeboye Golf Club
- Assisi Animal Sanctuary
- Ark Farm (near the town of Conlig)

== Notable people ==
- Eddie Irvine; ex-Formula One racing driver was raised on the Green Road, which lies on the outskirts of Conlig Village.
- Viscount Pirrie; who replaced Edward Harland as Chairman of Harland and Wolff, was also raised in Conlig. Had he not become ill, he would have been on the Titanic's doomed maiden voyage.
- Cllr Ian Adamson OBE (born 1944); former Lord Mayor of Belfast, also grew up in Conlig, his family owned the village shop.
- Edward L. Sloan was born in Conlig. He was a journalist, editor, and writer associated Latter-day Saint papers including the Millennial Star and The Deseret News. He founded The Salt Lake Herald.
