= List of Ramsar sites in Northern Ireland =

Ramsar sites in Northern Ireland are wetlands of international importance designated under the Ramsar Convention. In the United Kingdom, the first Ramsar sites were designated in 1976. Designated and proposed sites in Northern Ireland are listed below:

== Ramsar sites in Northern Ireland ==
Name	Location	Area (km^{2})	Designated	Description	Image
Ballynahone Bog	County Londonderry; 54°49′N 6°40′W	2.43	31 December 1998	One of the two largest intact active bogs in Northern Ireland with hummock and hollow pool complexes.	
Belfast Lough	County Antrim and County Down; 54°38′N 5°54′W	4.32	5 August 1998		
Black Bog	County Tyrone	1.83	28 July 2000		
Carlingford Lough	County Down	8.31	9 March 1998		
Cuilcagh Mountain	County Fermanagh	27.44	31 December 1998		
Derryleckagh (proposed)	County Down				
Dundrum Bay (proposed)	County Down				
Fairy Water Bogs	County Tyrone	2.24	28 July 2000		
Fardrum and Roosky Turloughs	County Fermanagh	0.43	10 June 2002		
Garron Plateau	County Antrim	46.50	31 December 1998		
Garry Bog	County Antrim	1.55	8 November 2000		
Killough Bay	County Down				
Larne Lough	County Antrim	3.96	4 March 1997		
Lough Foyle	County Londonderry	22.04	2 February 1999		
Lough Neagh and Lough Beg		501.66	5 January 1976		
Magheraveely Marl Loughs (proposed)		0.59	7 February 2007		
Outer Ards	County Down				
Pettigoe Plateau	County Fermanagh	9.0	31 July 1986		
Slieve Beagh	County Fermanagh and County Tyrone	18.85	28 July 2000		
Strangford Lough	County Down	155.81	9 March 1998		
Teal Lough (proposed)					
Turmennan Lough	County Down	0.15	10 June 2002		
Upper Lough Erne	County Fermanagh	58.18	4 March 1997		

== See also ==
- Ramsar Convention
- List of Ramsar sites worldwide
