= Ballynahone Bog =

Bog in Northern Ireland

Coordinates: 54°49′25″N 6°39′40″W

Designations

Ramsar Wetland
- Official name: Ballynahone Bog
- Designated: 31 December 1998
- Reference no.: 967

Ballynahone Bog (from Irish Baile na hAbhann 'townland of the river') is a raised bog, situated in County Londonderry, Northern Ireland, about 3 km south of Maghera, on low-lying ground immediately north of the Moyola River about 14 km from its mouth at Lough Neagh. It is one of the largest lowland raised bogs in Northern Ireland.

== Features ==
The raised bog which covers most of the site contains characteristic vegetation and structural features associated with this type of habitat such as bog pools and hummocks. The raised bog dome is surrounded by cut-over bog with poor fen and birch woodland.

Peat found here was made by decayed branches and leaves of trees and plants. The extraction of this peat was first made by the UPW. Locals who were against the extraction set up the FFB in 1990. In the end the area was declared an Area of Special Scientific Interest (ASSI) after successful petitioning by the FFB and Friends of the Earth.

== Flora and fauna ==
The bog vegetation features a high percentage cover of sphagnum mosses, ericoid dwarf-shrubs such as cross-leaved heath Erica tetralix and heather Calluna vulgaris, and other associated species such as hare's-tail cottongrass Eriophorum vaginatum, common cottongrass Eriophorum angustifolium, deergrass Trichophorum cespitosum and sundew species Drosera. Additional species, also well represented within the bog include Bog Asphodel Narthecium ossifragum and White Beak-sedge Rhynchospora alba, with occasional patches of Bog-myrtle Myrica gale also occurring.

== Ramsar site ==
The Ballynahone Bog Ramsar site (wetlands of international importance designated under the Ramsar Convention), is 243.24 hectares in area, at Latitude 54 49 25 N and Longitude 06 39 40 W. It was designated a Ramsar site on 31 December 1998. The site qualifies under criterion 1a of the Ramsar Convention by being a particularly good representative example of lowland raised bog. It is one of the two largest intact active bogs in Northern Ireland with hummock and hollow pool complexes and represents one of the best examples of this habitat type in the United Kingdom.

== Peat Extraction and ASSI status ==
In 1979 a producer of peat for horticulture opened a factory (with government aid) and leased two bogs in the townland of Ballynahone More. In 1987 there was an application for planning permission to extract peat by milling from Ballynahone, Mullagh and Knocnakielt. In 1988, despite objections raised against the scheme, the Department of the Environment in Northern Ireland granted Planning Permission to the company.

In 1990 the Ulster Wildlife Trust sent out a Press release inviting members to "... take their last walk on an Ulster Bog - now that the fight to retain its ancient flora and fauna has been lost". This walk drew in people from the surrounding area, a public meeting was held and the Friends of the Ballynahone Bog (FBB) were launched. In 1991 the peat development company dug 13 miles of drains on the southern half of Ballynahone Bog threatening the plants of the raised bog. In 1993 FBB started the process of declaring Ballynahone Bog a National Nature Reserve. After pressure from Professor David Bellamy and Friends of the Earth, planning permission was revoked and the government announced their intention of declaring the bog an Area of Special Scientific Interest (ASSI).

In December 1993, the peat company dammed the drains it had cut in the bog with about 1700 dams helping to maintain the height of the water table. In January 1995 Ballynahone Bog was declared an ASSI by the Environment and Heritage Service. FBB are now in partnership with the Ulster Wildlife Trust to try to reverse the damage done to the bog in order to encourage the revival of the specialized bog plants, such as the sundew, and the wildlife such as insects and birds which depend upon them.

== See also ==
- List of Ramsar sites in Northern Ireland

== Further references ==
Crory, Andrew. 2016. Fritillary Butterflies. The Irish Hare. Ulster Wildlife Membership Magazine. Issue 113 p.4
