= Banagher Old Church =

Ruined church in County Londonderry, Northern Ireland

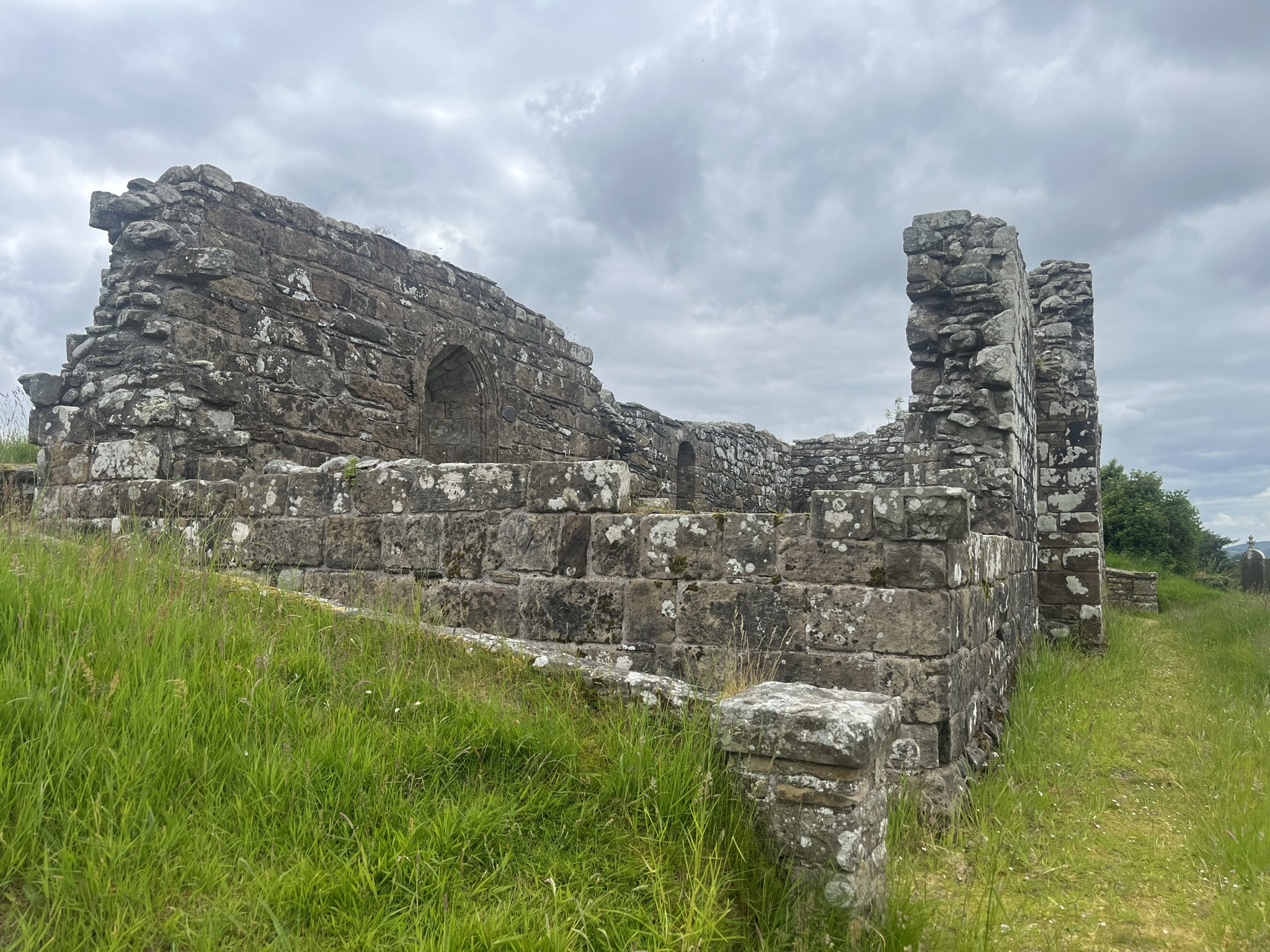
- Ruins of the church with the nave in the foreground.

- Location within Northern Ireland
- 54.9051°N 6.9483°W
- Type: Church Ruins
- Location: Dungiven, County Londonderry, Northern Ireland

History
- Founded: St Muiredach O’Heney (by tradition)
- Built: 11th Century

Site notes
- Governing body: Department for Communities

Scheduled monument
- Type: Monument in State Care
- Name: Banagher Old Church, tomb, cross and residence
- Condition: Ruined (pre-1622)
- Local Authority: Causeway Coast and Glens

Banagher Old Church is a monument in state care, and a scheduled monument, in Banagher near Dungiven in County Londonderry, Northern Ireland. Local tradition ascribes the foundation of the church to either Saint Patrick, or more commonly, St Muiredach O’Heney. Whilst an inscription etched in the 1730s states that ‘this church was built in ye year of God 474’, there is no evidence that the church is that old. Instead it was likely founded towards the end of the 11th century. Its first definitive reference in recorded history is related to 1121, when it is mentioned in the Annals of Ulster as the site where the king of the Ciannachta was killed by his own kinsmen. It was later noted as the base for Archbishop Colton of Armagh's 1397 visit to the Diocese of Derry. It is unknown when the church was abandoned, but a survey of churches of the area in 1622 noted it was already ruined.

Interest in the site as an important ecclesiastical ruin was revived in the late 19th century. In 1880 it passed into state care from the church Temporal Commissioners. In the 1970s the church was fully excavated and underwent a conservation programme.

== Protected Monuments ==
Church: The church elements vary in age, with the nave being the oldest part and likely dating from the late 11th century. The chancel was added soon after in the early 12th century and the east end of the church was extensively remodelled in the 15th century before falling into ruin by the 17th.

Mortuary house: The site's association with St. O’Heney goes beyond the local tradition of it being founded by him. In the graveyard there lies the seven foot high mortuary house, which is said to hold his remains. It was an important pilgrimage site for many centuries, as sites of supposed saints’ relics often are. The relics location here gave rise to the still-living tradition that ‘Banagher Sand’ is supposed to bring you good luck, especially in sporting events. This house is the most sophisticated of a small group of Ulster mortuary houses found from County Down to County Donegal.

Residence: Outside the church lies a building known as ‘the residence’ where St. O’Heney was supposed to have made his appearances. The most likely explanation is that it was a "strong house", intended to protect the church's possessions and as accommodation for the rector. There is no clear evidence for when the building dates from.

Termon Crosses: Two crosses remain of what were originally likely five. Termon crosses were used across Ireland to mark the boundaries of early Christian ecclesiastical sites, after which right of sanctuary would prevail. The crosses simplicity however make them very hard to date.

Photos of Banagher Old Church
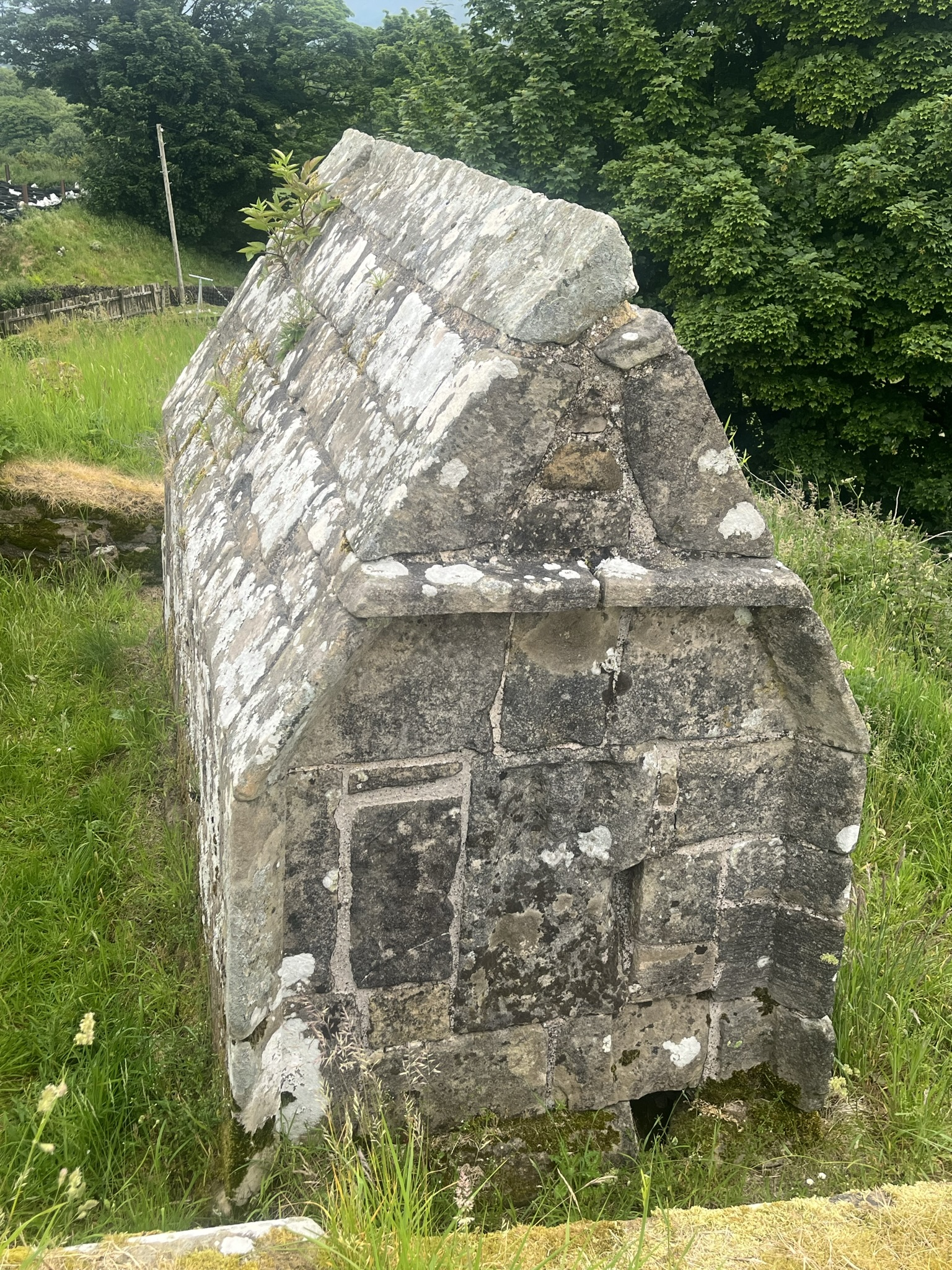
Mortuary house said to contain the remains of St Muiredach O’Heney

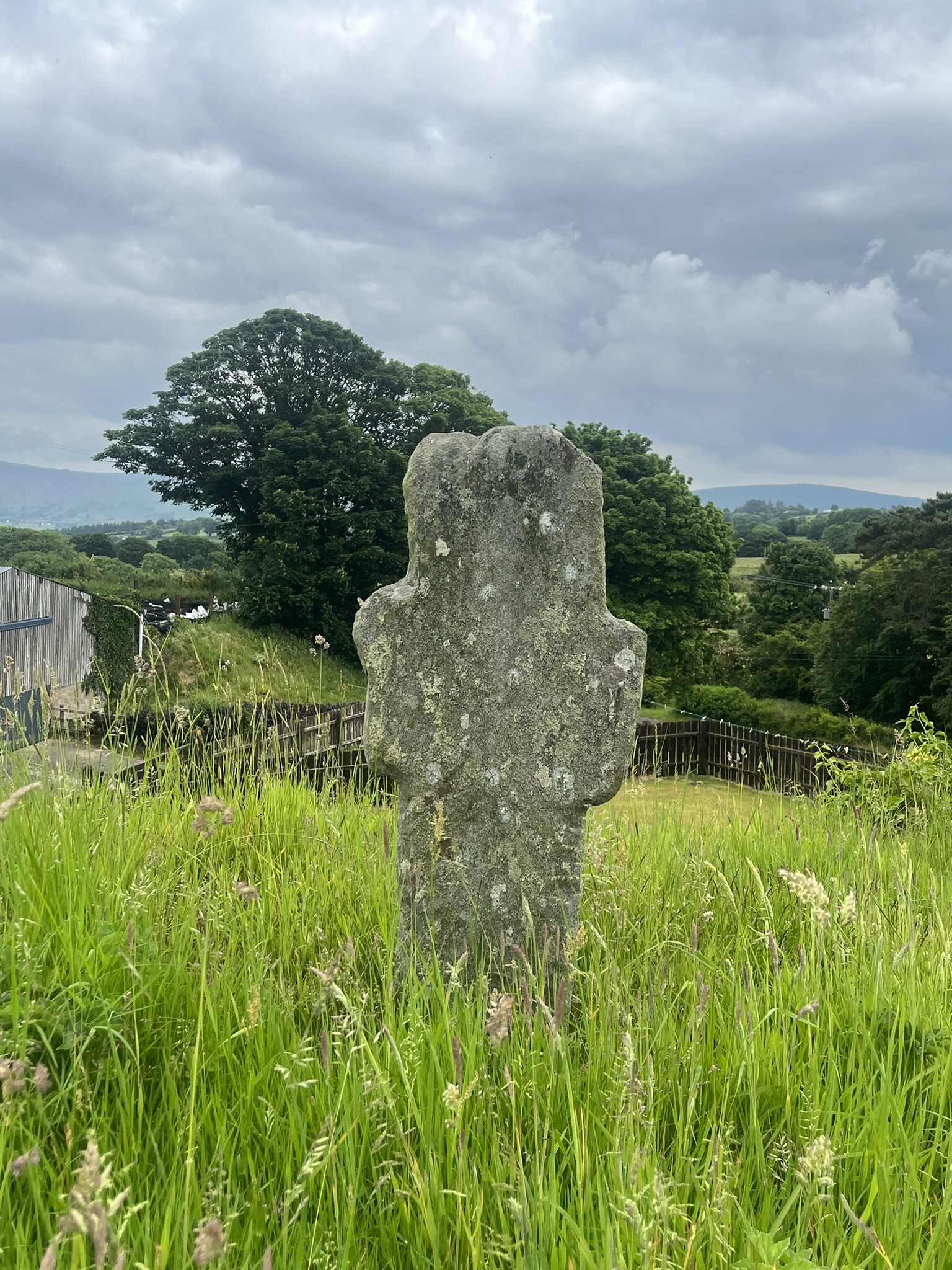
Termon cross marking the boundary of Old Banagher Church

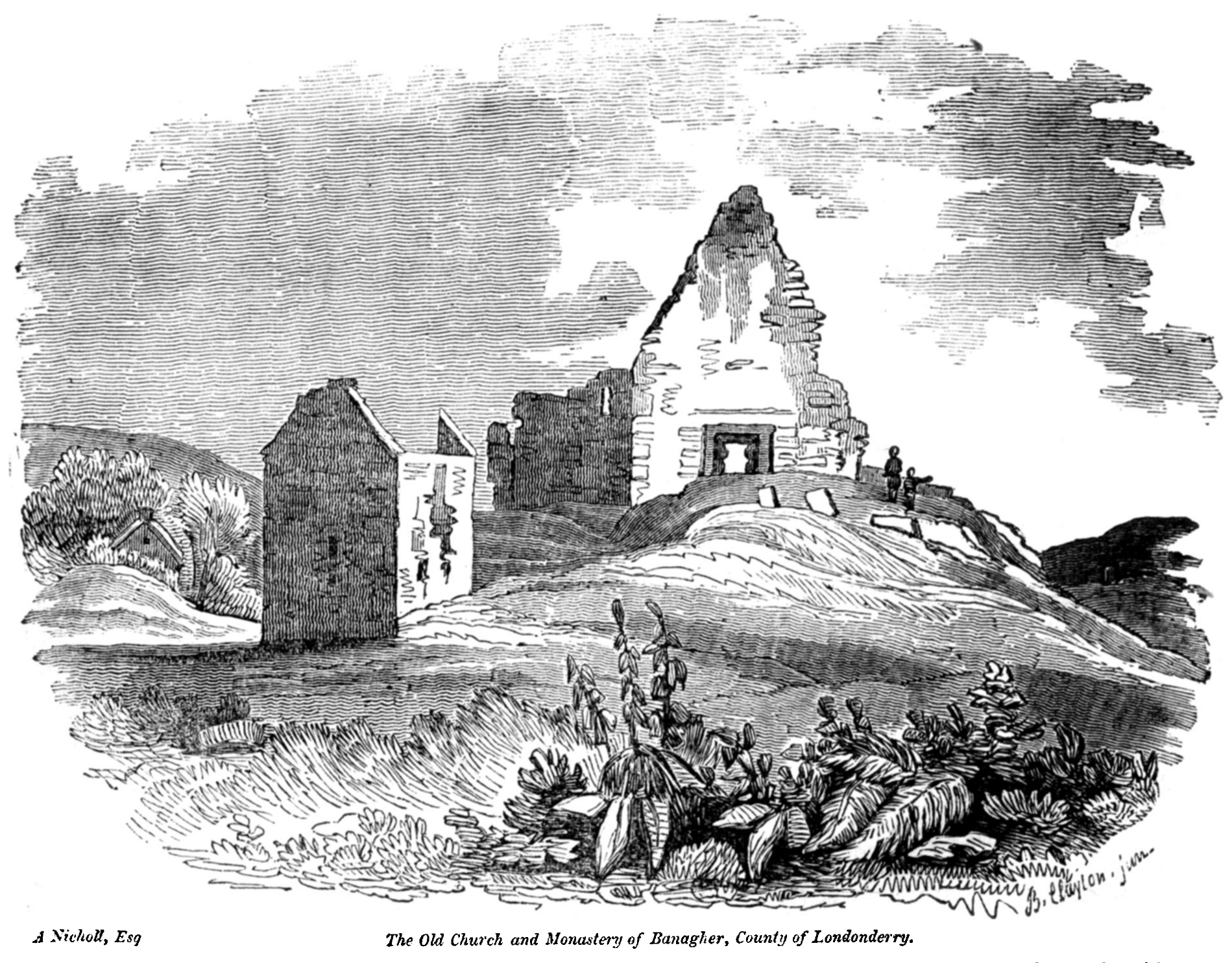
19th Century engraving entitled 'The Old Church and Monastery of Banagher, County of Londonderry'

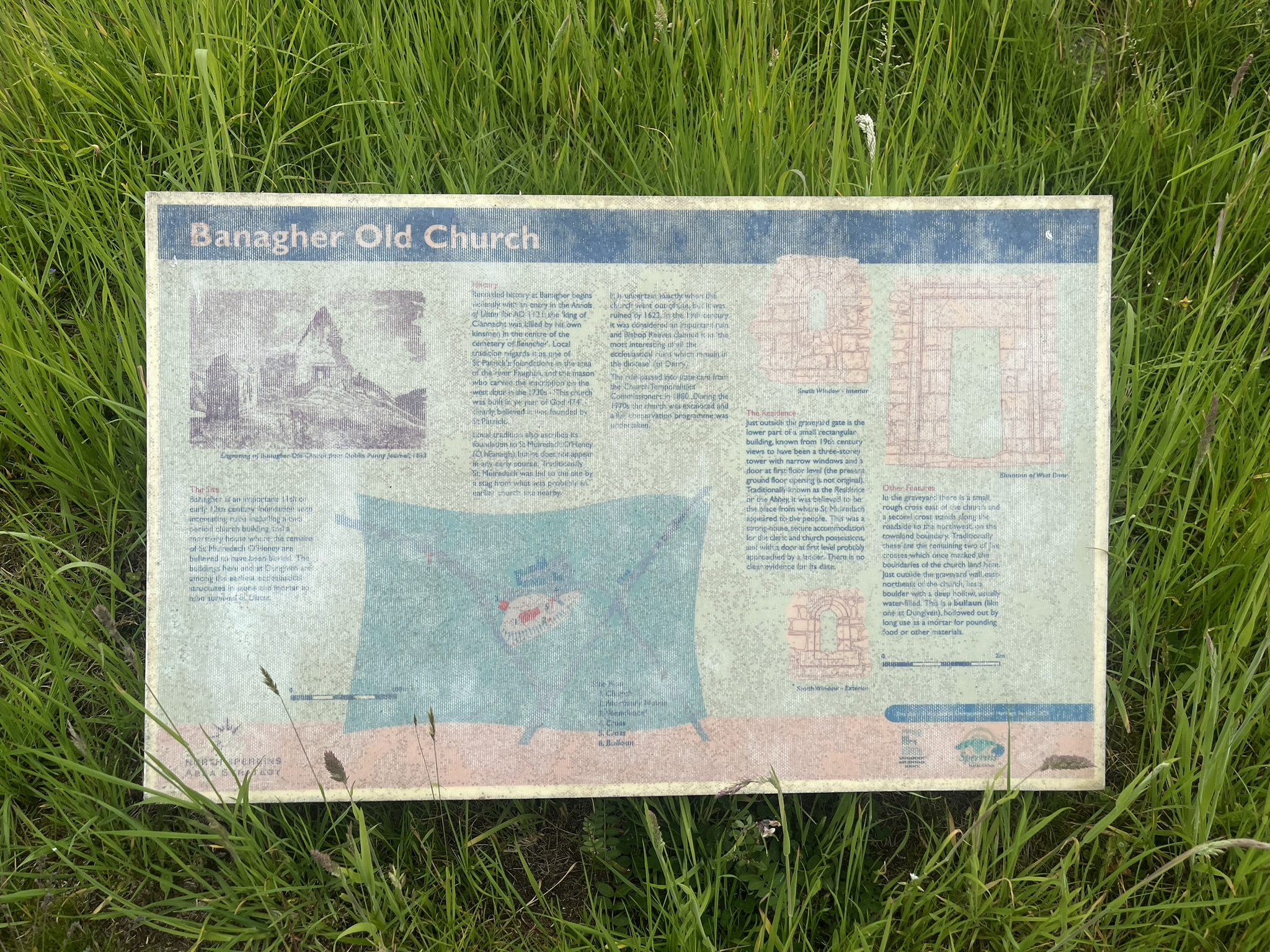
Information board detailing the history of Banagher Old Church

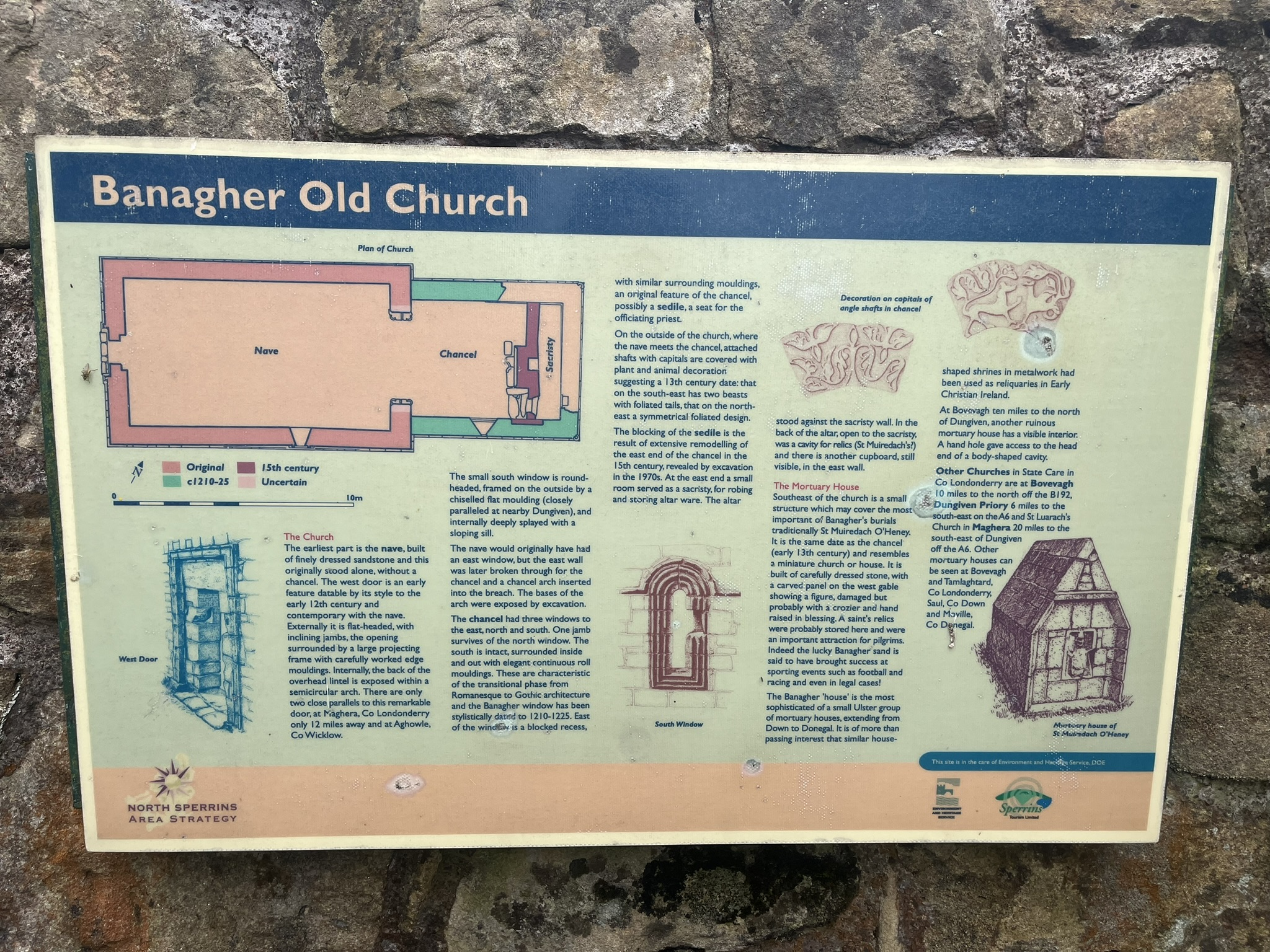
Description and history of the church and mortuary house at Banagher Old Church
