= Bohill Forest =

Forest in Northern Ireland

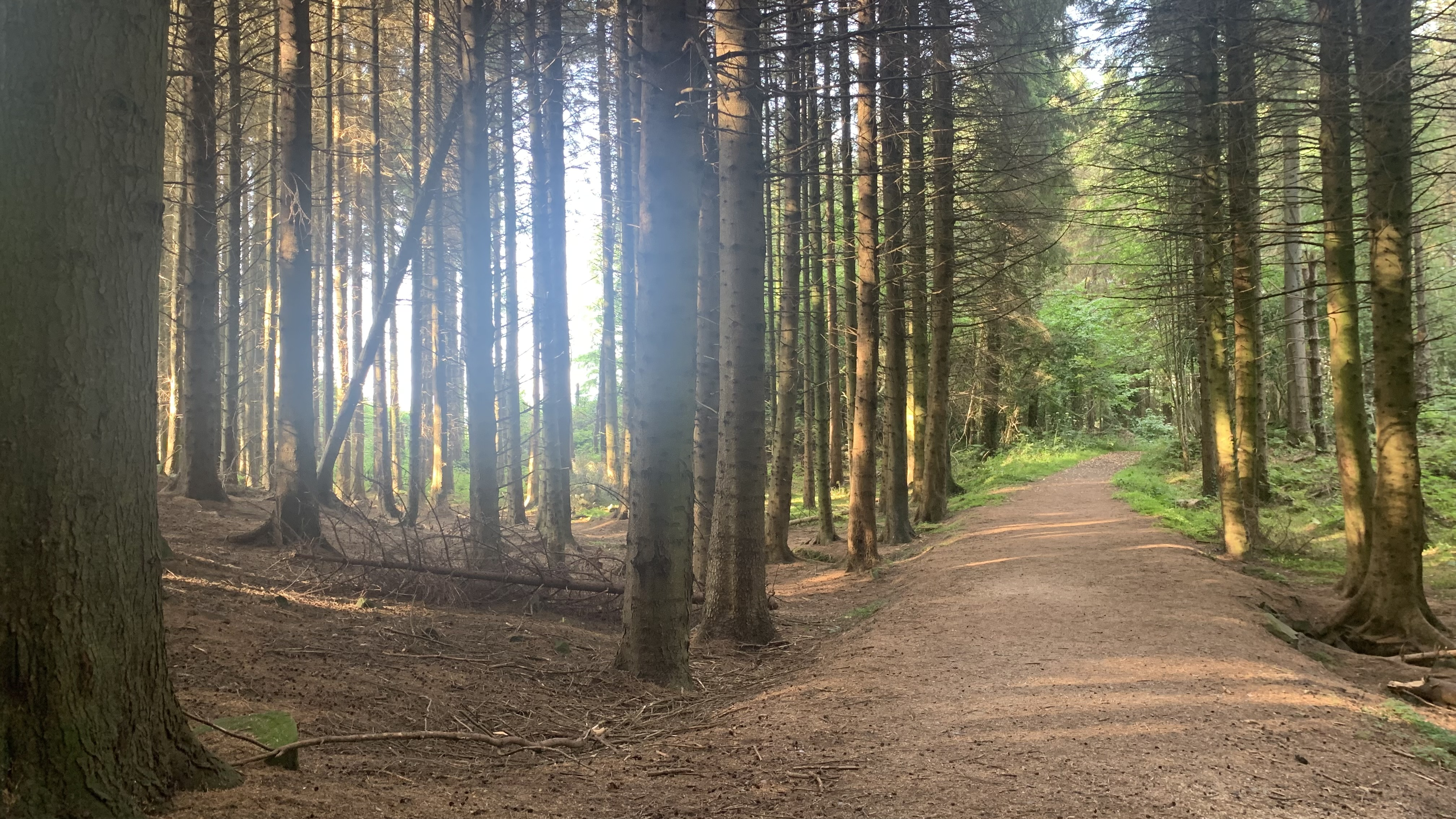
- Setting Sun at Bohill Nature Reserve

- Location within Northern Ireland
- Interactive map of Bohill Forest

Geography
- Location: Down, Northern Ireland, United Kingdom
- Coordinates: 54°20′50″N 5°50′40″W
- Elevation: 180 m (590 ft)
- Area: 38.96 ha (96.3 acres)

Administration
- Status: Nature reserve (partially)
- Established: Unknown
- Authority: Forest Service Northern Ireland

Ecology
- Ecosystems: Temperate broadleaf and mixed forest
- WWF Classification: Celtic broadleaf forests
- Disturbance: Historical clear-felling; natural regeneration
- Forest cover: Mixed deciduous and coniferous
- Dominant tree species: Holly, oak, birch, rowan, hazel
- Lesser flora: Bracken, bilberry, heather, mosses, liverworts, ferns
- Fauna: Red deer, woodland birds, butterflies

Bohill Forest is a small coniferous forest located near Drumaness, County Down, Northern Ireland. It is managed by the Forest Service Northern Ireland and includes a designated nature reserve established to protect the habitat of the holly blue butterfly (Celastrina argiolus). The Bohill Forest Nature Reserve covers approximately 2.8 hectares within the larger forest area of 38.96 hectares. It is situated at grid reference J396459, about 4 miles southeast of Ballynahinch.

== History ==
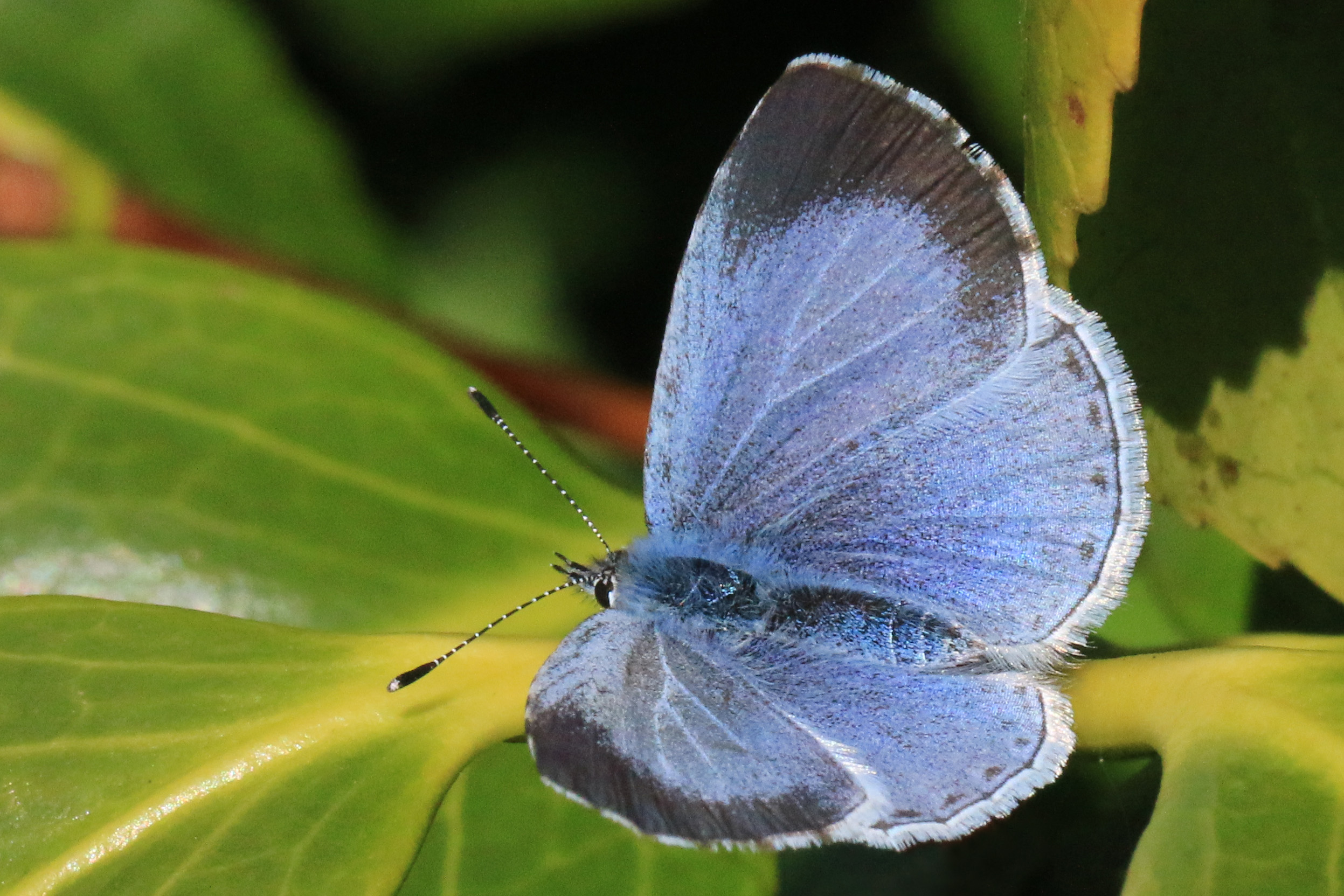
The Bohill Forest Nature Reserve was set up to protect the holly blue butterfly

Bohill Forest was historically clear-felled, and the land was subsequently allowed to regenerate naturally. This regeneration led to the development of a small area of deciduous woodland, now comprising holly, oak, birch, rowan, and hazel. The forest includes a tiny pocket of native scrub, largely of holly with oak standards, situated on a steeply sloping, south-east facing Silurian shale hill. Until the mid-1960s, this area was mixed scrub.

Today, bracken and bilberry dominate the small clearings, which provide ideal conditions for the holly blue butterfly (Celastrina argiolus), typically seen in May. This is considered a key site for the species, which remains rare in Northern Ireland.

The forest was later designated as a National Nature Reserve (NNR) specifically to protect the holly blue butterfly. Management of the reserve focuses on maintaining sunny clearings, which are essential for the butterfly’s lifecycle. Several woodland bird species also abound in the area, including goldcrests, jays, chiffchaffs, and blackcaps.

Additionally, approximately 40 hectares of Bohill Forest have been selected for restoration as an ancient woodland site and are classified as oakwood, a Northern Ireland Priority Habitat.

== Ecology and Conservation ==
The reserve occupies land that was previously clear-felled and coppiced, and has since undergone secondary regrowth, resulting in a woodland dominated by holly, oak, birch, rowan, and hazel.

The site features several clearings, some dominated by bracken, others by heather, creating a mosaic of habitats. These conditions are considered optimum for the holly blue butterfly, which remains scarce in Northern Ireland. The butterfly benefits from the presence of holly and ivy, which serve as larval food plants, and from the sunny woodland glades that support its lifecycle. The speckled wood butterfly (Pararge aegeria) is also commonly found in the area, occupying the dappled shade around woodland edges.

Other fauna include red deer, whose presence is revealed by footprints and droppings, and a variety of woodland birds such as jays, goldcrests, tits, chiffchaffs, and blackcaps. The reserve also supports a diversity of mosses, liverworts, and ferns, particularly on shaded rocky outcrops on the steep slopes.

== Access and Facilities ==
Bohill Forest has no formal recreational facilities. Visitors typically park on the roadside verge and access the site via a Forest Service track from the public road to the east. The best time to observe butterflies and other wildlife is typically between April and June.

== Management ==
The forest is managed by the Forest Service Northern Ireland, with conservation oversight provided by the Northern Ireland Environment Agency. Management practices focus on maintaining the natural regeneration of native species and preserving open areas for butterfly habitat.
