= Forest Service Northern Ireland =

Northern Irish executive agency

Executive Agency overview
- Formed: April 1, 1998
- Jurisdiction: Northern Ireland Executive
- Headquarters: Inishkeen House (Enniskillen)
- Parent department: Department of Agriculture, Environment and Rural Affairs (DAERA)
- Website: www.daera-ni.gov.uk/topics/forestry

The Forest Service Northern Ireland is an executive agency of the Department of Agriculture, Environment and Rural Affairs entrusted with the development of forestry and the management of forests in Northern Ireland. It was created on 1 April 1998. The Service supplies timber, protects and regenerates forests, provides public access, and works with private industry to enable renewable energy generation. It also oversees compliance with forestry legislation.

== Activities ==
The Forest Service was created on 1 April 1998. The Forest Service holds headquarters at Inishkeen House in Enniskillen and forest offices in Castlewellan and Garvagh, and a plant health inspection facility at Belfast airport. It manages 62,000 hectares of forest and employs 205 people. As of 2025, the chief executive is John Joe O’Boyle.

The Forest Service activities involve management of the department's forests, including supplying timber, protecting forests, promoting public access and ensuring sustainable management. They are required to audit their sustainable management independently against the UK Woodland Assurance Standard. Their annual harvest is 400,000 m3.

The service is required to operate a Rural Development Programme to promote forest expansion, but also to release land from forestry for renewable energy generation and the improvement of the environment.

The Forest Service is the regulatory body for compliance with forestry legislation.

In March 2025 the Service announced a Wind Energy Market Engagement for the purpose of providing renewable energy.
