= Heygate =

Heygate is a surname. Notable people with the surname include:

- Sir Frederick Heygate, 2nd Baronet (1822–1894), British politician
- Harold Heygate (1884–1937), English cricketer
- James Heygate (fl. 1630–1638), Scottish-born Anglican bishop in Ireland
- John Heygate (1903–1976), Northern Irish journalist and novelist
- Reginald Heygate (1883–1956), English cricketer
- Richard Heygate (born 1940), British businessman and writer
- William Heygate (disambiguation)

== See also ==
- Heygate Baronets
