= Limavady railway station =

Railway station in Limavady, Northern Ireland

Limavady

General information
- Location: Limavady; County Londonderry; Northern Ireland
- Coordinates: 55.0541°N 6.9481°W

History
- Original company: Londonderry and Coleraine Railway
- Post-grouping: Belfast and Northern Counties Railway

Key dates
- 29 December 1852: Station opens
- 3 July 1950: Station closes to passengers
- 2 May 1955: Station closes
Location

Limavady railway station served Limavady in County Londonderry in Northern Ireland.

== History ==
The Londonderry and Coleraine Railway opened the station on 29 December 1852.

The Limavady branch was closed to passenger traffic on 3 July 1950, the same day the then goods only section of the line to Dungiven was closed, and then the rest of the line closed completely on 2 May 1955. Nowadays the nearest station is at Bellarena, approximately 5 miles (8.0 km) from the town.

== Railway Revival ==
The All-Island Strategic Rail Review on railways commissioned in 2021 recommends reinstating short spur of the Limavady branch up to Limavady.

== Routes ==
Preceding station	Disused railways	Following station
Broighter	Londonderry and Coleraine Railway; Limavady Junction to Dungiven	Ardmore
