= Limavady Railway =

Coordinates: 54.990°N 6.935°W

Overview
- Status: Closed
- Owner: Londonderry and Coleraine Railway
- Locale: Northern Ireland
- Termini: Limavady Junction; Dungiven
- Stations: 7

Service
- Operator(s): Londonderry and Coleraine Railway

History
- Opened: 29 December 1852
- Closed: 2 May 1955

Technical
- Track gauge: 1,600 mm (5 ft 3 in)

The Limavady Railway was a railway line that branched off from the Belfast–Derry line at Limavady Junction near Ballykelly to Limavady. The line was later extended a further 7 miles to Dungiven. The Limavady to Dungiven section of the line was closed on 3 July 1950.

The initial branch was opened on 29 December 1852 by the Londonderry and Coleraine Railway and was extended to its final terminus, Dungiven, on 4 July 1883; the extension was closed for passenger traffic on 1 January 1933 and finally closed altogether on 3 July 1950, with the rest of the line losing its passenger service the same day.

The Limavady section, having already lost its passenger service, was closed entirely on 2 May 1955. Although the line was removed, remnants of the line can be found around Limavady, usually in the form of bridges, including the old railway bridge outside Limavady on the Seacoast Road.

An All-Island Strategic Rail Review published jointly by the Irish and Northern Irish governments in 2023 recommended reopening the line to Limavady, although it has yet to be implemented as of 2024.
