= Binevenagh =

Mountain in Northern Ireland

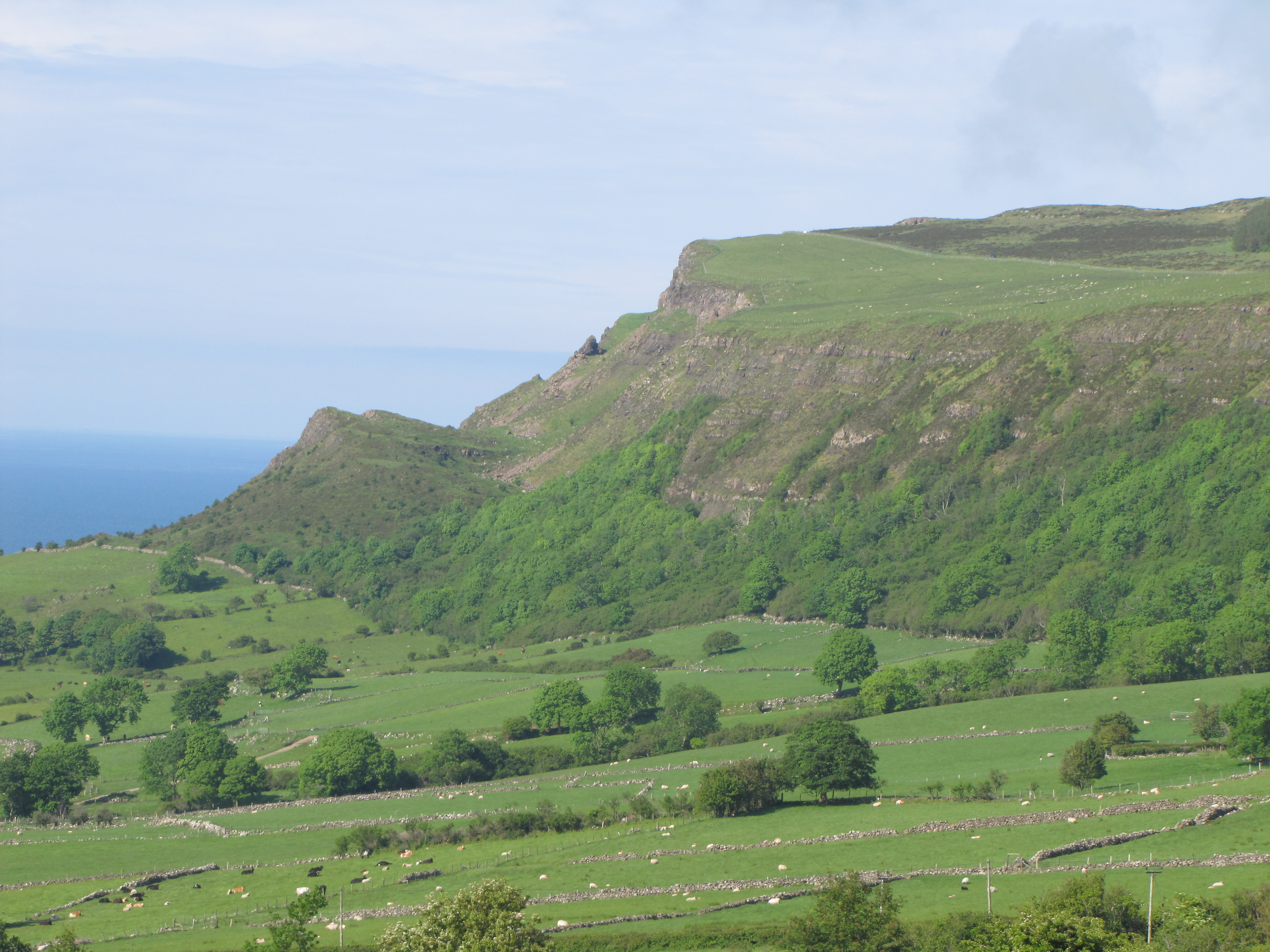

Highest point
- Elevation: 385 m (1,263 ft)
- Prominence: 170 m (560 ft)
- Listing: Marilyn
- Coordinates: 55°07′N 6°55′W

Naming
- Native name: Binn Fhoibhne (Irish)
- English translation: 'Foibhne's peak'
- Pronunciation: Irish: [ˌbʲiːn̠ʲ ˈɛvʲnʲə]

Geography
- Location within Northern Ireland
- Location: County Londonderry, Northern Ireland
- Parent range: Antrim Plateau
- OSI/OSNI grid: C692302
- Topo map: OSNI Discoverer Series 04 Coleraine (1:50000)
- AONB map: Map of the AONB in Northern Ireland.

Binevenagh (from Irish Binn Fhoibhne, meaning 'Foibhne's peak') is a large, steep-sided hill in County Londonderry, Northern Ireland. It is part of the Keenaght Hills, which mark the western edge of the Antrim Plateau, formed around 60 million years ago by molten lava. Binevenagh and its cliffs overlook the Magilligan peninsula and dominate the skyline over the villages of Bellarena, Downhill, Castlerock and Benone beach. The area has been classified as both an Area of Special Scientific Interest and as an Area of Outstanding Natural Beauty (AONB). The total area of the AONB is 138 km^{2}.

The Bishop's Road, named after the Bishop of Derry, extends across the plateau. Notable features include a cliff top viewing area giving good views over Lough Foyle and across Inishowen in County Donegal.

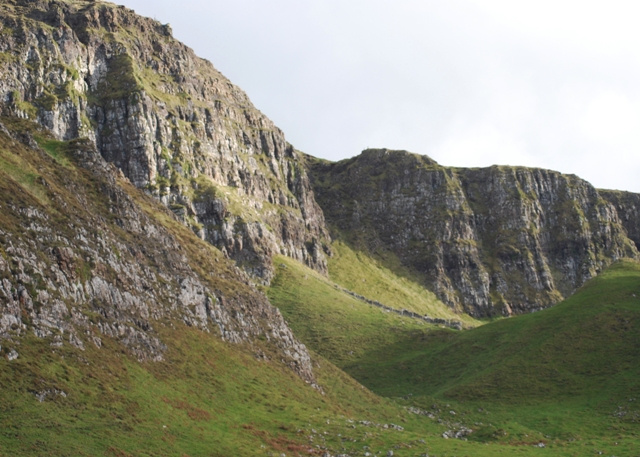
Binevenagh cliffs

== Sport ==
- Gliding - the Ulster Gliding Club uses the slopes for gliders.
- Hang gliding and Paragliding - the slopes are used for soaring by the Ulster Hang gliding and Paragliding Club (UHPC).
- Fishing - an artificial lake at the top of the mountain is used for trout fishing.
- Motorsport - the Coleraine & District Motor Club run the Eagles Rock hillclimbing event during the month of July.

== Railway access ==
The trains on the Belfast-Derry railway line, run by NI Railways (NIR), call at Bellarena railway station between Waterside railway station, in Derry, and Castlerock railway station. Trains continue from Castlerock to Coleraine railway station and other stations to Belfast Lanyon Place and Belfast Grand Central.

== Plane crash ==
On 24 June 1944 a Consolidated Liberator V (FL977) of No. 5 Squadron RAF was returning to RAF Ballykelly after an anti-submarine patrol off Iceland. The aircraft crashed into Binevenagh during its third attempt to land, killing all nine crewmembers on board.
