= Barmouth railway station (Northern Ireland) =

Railway station in County Londonderry, Northern Ireland

Barmouth
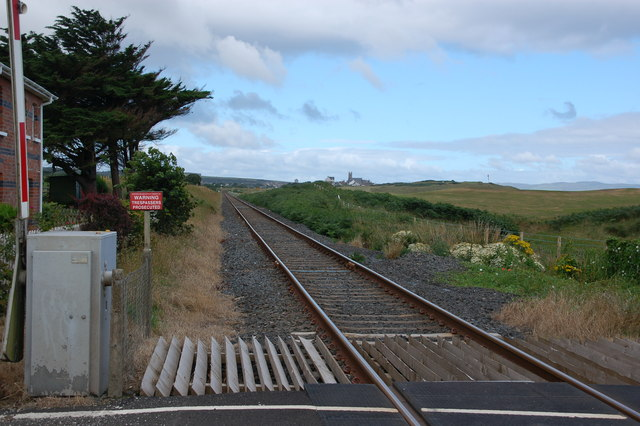
- The site of Barmouth station in 2006

General information
- Location: Castlerock, County Londonderry; Northern Ireland
- Coordinates: 55.160249°N 6.76962°W

Other information
- Status: Disused

History
- Original company: Londonderry and Coleraine Railway
- Post-grouping: Belfast and Northern Counties Railway

Key dates
- 1 May 1855: Station opens
- 1 February 1856: Station closes
Location

Barmouth railway station served the village of Articlave and the surrounding area in County Londonderry in Northern Ireland.

The Londonderry and Coleraine Railway opened the station on 1 May 1855.

The station was some distance from any urban settlements, and was very lightly used. It closed on 1 February 1856. The station building still stands and is used as a private residence.

== Routes ==
Preceding station	Historical railways	Following station
Coleraine; Line and station open	Londonderry and Coleraine Railway; Coleraine-Derry	Castlerock; Line and station open
