= Downhill railway station =

Railway station in County Londonderry, Northern Ireland

Downhill
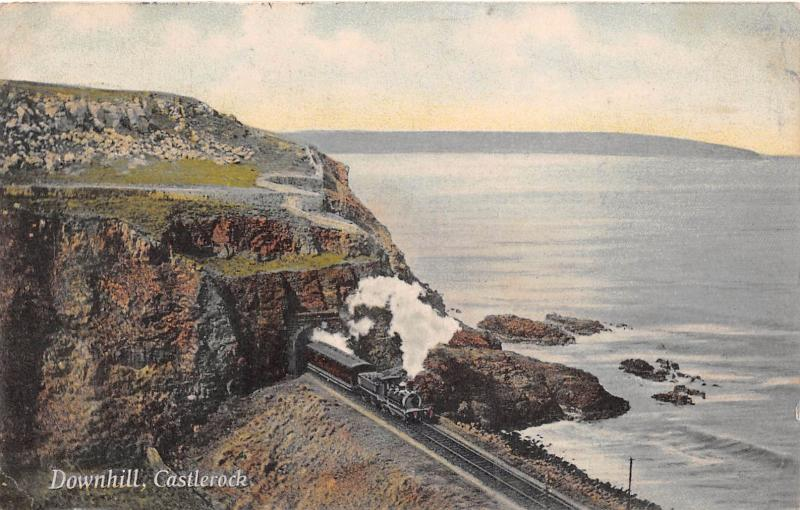
- postcard of Downhill railway station from 1905

General information
- Location: Downhill, County Londonderry; Northern Ireland
- Coordinates: 55.166446°N 6.820480°W
- Platforms: 1

Other information
- Status: Disused

History
- Original company: Londonderry and Coleraine Railway
- Pre-grouping: Belfast and Northern Counties Railway
- Post-grouping: Northern Ireland Railways

Key dates
- 18 July 1853: Station opens
- 3 September 1973: Station closes
Location

Downhill railway station served the hamlet of Downhill in County Londonderry in Northern Ireland.

The Londonderry and Coleraine Railway opened the station on 18 July 1853. A station building and adjacent station house was erected in 1874 to designs by the architect John Lanyon.

It closed on 3 September 1973.

== Routes ==
Preceding station	NI Railways	Following station
Castlerock	Northern Ireland Railways; Belfast-Derry	Magilligan
	Historical railways	
Castlerock; Line and station open	Londonderry and Coleraine Railway; Coleraine-Derry	Umbra; Line open, station closed
