= Culmore railway station =

Railway station in Northern Ireland

Culmore
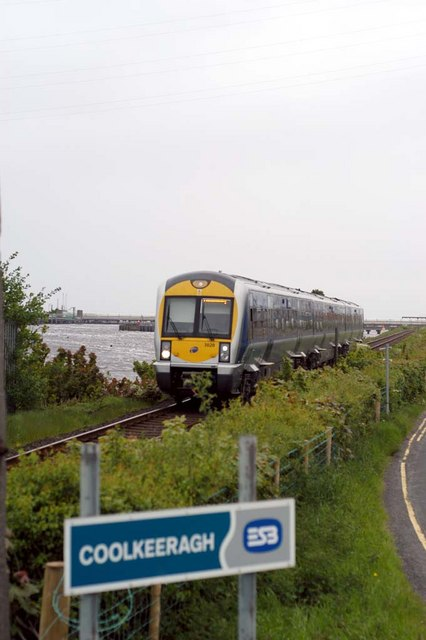
- NIR Class 3000 train passing the site of Culmore station in 2006

General information
- Location: Culmore, County Londonderry; Northern Ireland
- Coordinates: 55.0441°N 7.2518°W

Other information
- Status: Disused

History
- Original company: Londonderry and Coleraine Railway
- Post-grouping: Belfast and Northern Counties Railway

Key dates
- 1 October 1853: Station opens
- 2 July 1973: Station closes
Location
- Location within Northern Ireland

Culmore railway station served Culmore and Coolkeeragh in County Londonderry in Northern Ireland.

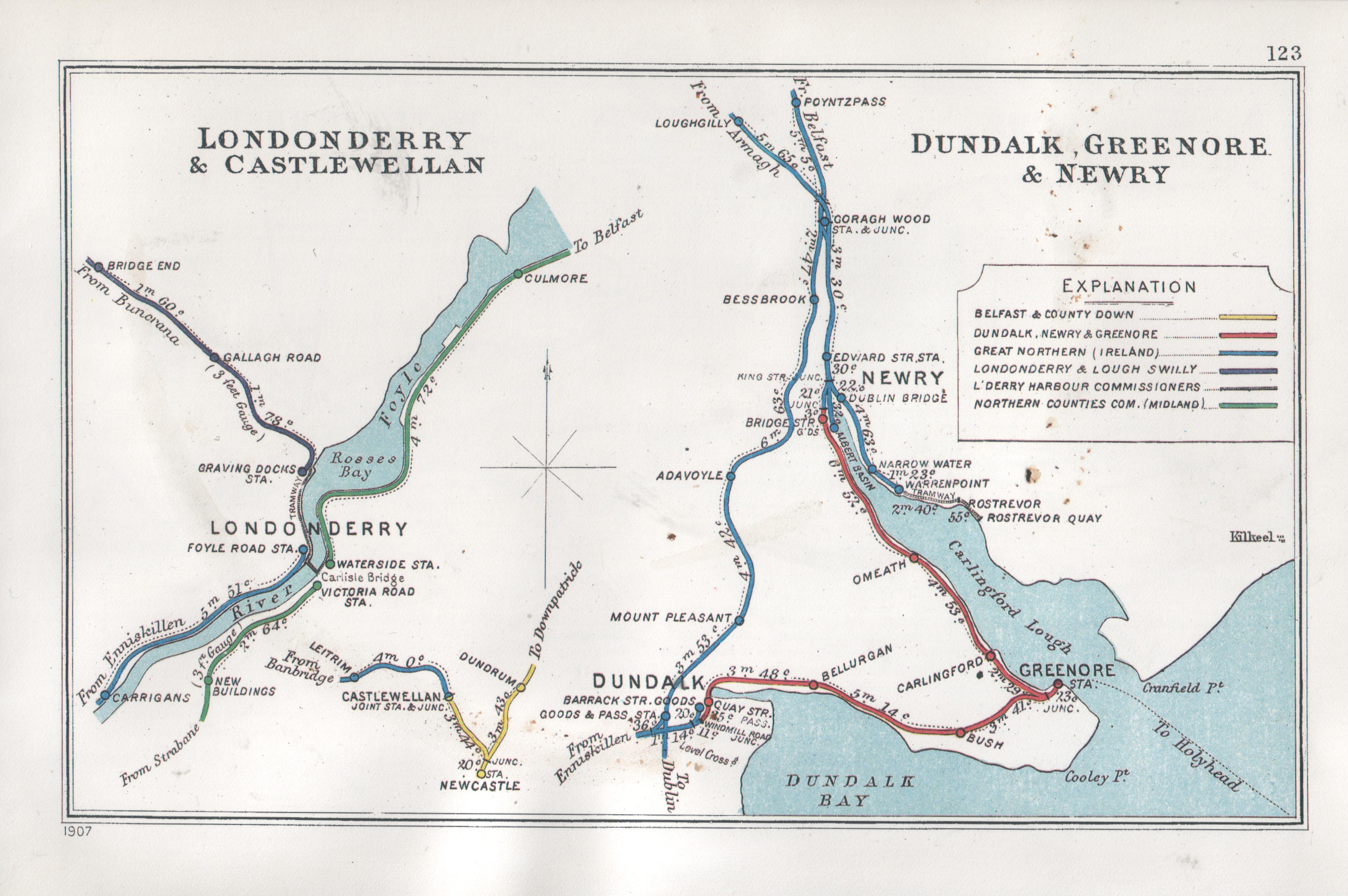
A 1907 Railway Clearing House Junction Diagram showing (left) railways in the vicinity of Culmore

The Londonderry and Coleraine Railway opened the station on 1 October 1853.

It closed on 2 July 1973.

== Routes ==
Preceding station	NI Railways	Following station
Bellarena	Northern Ireland Railways; Belfast-Derry	Derry~Londonderry
	Historical railways	
Eglinton; Line open, station closed	Londonderry and Coleraine Railway; Coleraine-Derry	Derry~Londonderry; Line and station open
