= Magilligan railway station =

Railway station in County Londonderry, Northern Ireland

Magilligan
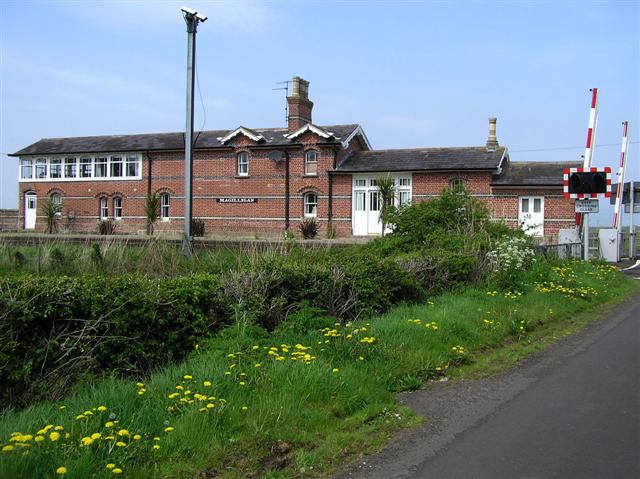
- Magilligan railway station photographed on 6 May 2008

General information
- Location: Magilligan, County Londonderry; Northern Ireland
- Coordinates: 55.1519°N 6.8913°W

Other information
- Status: Disused

History
- Original company: Londonderry and Coleraine Railway
- Pre-grouping: Belfast and Northern Counties Railway
- Post-grouping: Northern Ireland Railways

Key dates
- 1 November 1853: Station opens
- 17 October 1976: Station closes
Location

Magilligan railway station served the area of Magilligan in County Londonderry in Northern Ireland.

The Londonderry and Coleraine Railway opened the station on 1 November 1853. A station building was erected between 1873 and 1875 to designs by the architect John Lanyon.

A very short-lived horse-drawn tram operated from this station to Magilligan Point in 1855. Towards the end of the station's life, it was used for prison visits to the nearby HMP Magilligan. It closed on 17 October 1976.

== Routes ==
Preceding station	NI Railways	Following station
Castlerock	Northern Ireland Railways; Belfast-Derry	Bellarena
	Historical railways	
Umbra; Line open, station closed	Londonderry and Coleraine Railway; Coleraine-Derry	Bellarena; Line and station open
Terminus	Londonderry and Coleraine Railway; Magilligan Point Tramway	Drummond; Line and station closed
