= Heygate baronets =

Baronetcy in the Baronetage of the United Kingdom

Escutcheon of the Heygate baronets of Southend

The Heygate Baronetcy, of Southend in the County of Essex, is a title in the Baronetage of the United Kingdom. It was created on 30 September 1831 for William Heygate, Lord Mayor of London from 1822 to 1823 and member of parliament for Sudbury from 1818 to 1826.

The second Baronet, Sir Frederick William Heygate married Marianne Gage, daughter and heiress of Conolly Gage, in 1851 and so acquired Bellarena House at Bellarena, County Londonderry. He represented the constituency of County Londonderry in the House of Commons as a Conservative from 1859 to 1874. The third Baronet, Sir Frederick Gage Heygate was Parliamentary Under-Secretary to the Lord-Lieutenant of Ireland, the Marquess of Londonderry, from 1887 to 1888.

The second son of the first baronet, William Unwin Heygate (1825–1902), was a Member of Parliament from 1861 to 1865 and from 1870 to 1880.

The family seat was Bellarena House, near Magilligan, County Londonderry.

== Heygate baronets, of Southend (1831) ==
- Sir William Heygate, 1st Baronet (1782–1844)
- Sir Frederick William Heygate, 2nd Baronet (1822–1894)
- Sir Frederick Gage Heygate, 3rd Baronet (1854–1940)
- Sir John Edward Nourse Heygate, 4th Baronet (1903–1976)
- Sir George Lloyd Heygate, 5th Baronet (1936–1991)
- Sir Richard John Gage Heygate, 6th Baronet (born 1940)

The heir apparent is the present holder's son Frederick Carysfort Gage Heygate (born 1988).

== Notes ==
Baronetage of the United Kingdom
Preceded by Harty baronets	Heygate baronets of Southend; 30 September 1831	Succeeded by Jones baronets
