= Carrichue railway station =

Railway station in County Londonderry, Northern Ireland

Carrichue

General information
- Location: Carrichue, County Londonderry; Northern Ireland
- Coordinates: 55.0475°N 7.0599°W

Other information
- Status: Disused

History
- Original company: Londonderry and Coleraine Railway
- Pre-grouping: Belfast and Northern Counties Railway
- Post-grouping: Ulster Transport Authority

Key dates
- 29 December 1852: Station opens
- 20 September 1954: Station closes
Location

Carrichue railway station served Carrichue in County Londonderry in Northern Ireland.

The Londonderry and Coleraine Railway opened the station on 29 December 1852.

It closed on 20 September 1954.

== Routes ==
Preceding station	NI Railways	Following station
Ballykelly	Ulster Transport Authority; Belfast-Derry	Eglinton
	Historical railways	
Ballykelly; Line open, station closed	Londonderry and Coleraine Railway; Coleraine-Derry	Faughanvale; Line open, station closed
