= Ardmore, County Londonderry =

Village in County Londonderry, Northern Ireland

Ardmore Irish: An tArd Mór
- village and townland

Irish transcription(s)
  - Derivation: Ard Mór
  - Meaning: Great height
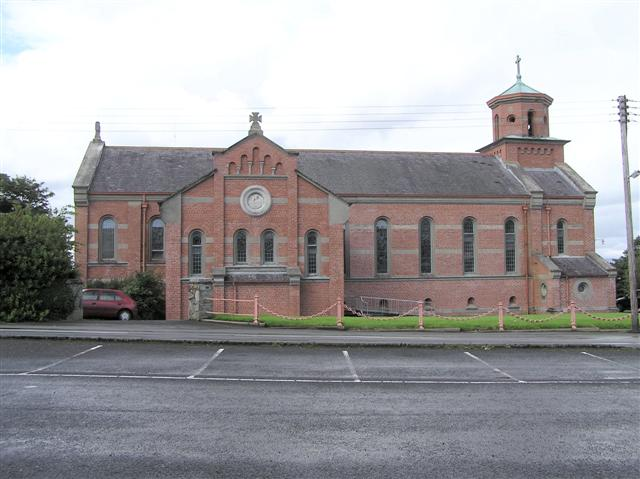
- Ardmore Roman Catholic Church in 2006

- Ardmore shown within Northern Ireland
- Coordinates: 54°57′22″N 7°16′44″W
- Sovereign state: United Kingdom
- Country: Northern Ireland
- County: Londonderry
- Barony: Tirkeeran
- Civil parish: Clondermot
- Settlements: Ardmore

Area
  - Total: 504.4 acres (204.11 ha)

Ardmore (from Irish An tArd Mór, meaning 'the great height') is a village and townland in County Londonderry, Northern Ireland. In the 2001 Census it had a population of 210. It is within Derry and Strabane district. Ardmore has a number of sports teams including cricket, soccer and Gaelic football. It also contains a pub, called McCourts Bar, where the Gaelic and soccer teams play, as there is a soccer and Gaelic pitch behind it. The City Of Derry Equestrian Centre is located here as well. Courteney Cox and Johnny McDaid were apparently going to get married at Ardmore Parish back in 2018 but they ended up not marrying there.

== Sport ==
- Ardmore Cricket Club

== Railways ==
The Londonderry and Coleraine Railway opened the Ardmore railway station on 4 July 1883.

It closed on 1 January 1933.

== Notable people ==
- Daniel Coyle, Olympic show jumper
