= Drumsurn =

Village in County Londonderry, Northern Ireland

Coordinates: 54°59′N 6°53′W

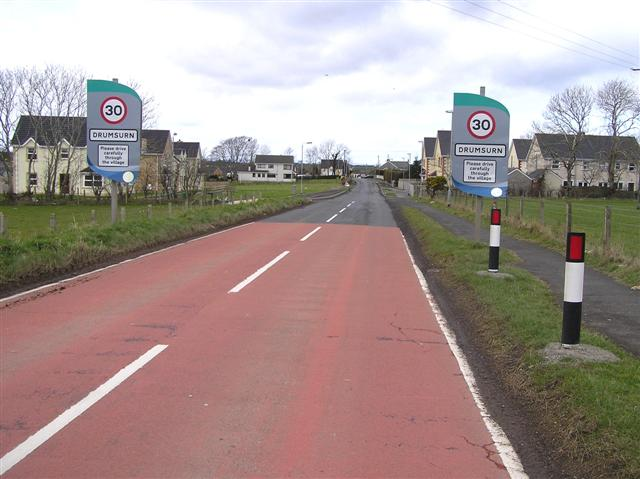
Drumsurn

Drumsurn (from Irish Droim Sorn 'furnace ridge') is a small village and townland in County Londonderry, Northern Ireland. It is 8 kilometres (5.0 mi) southeast of Limavady and 10 kilometres (6.2 mi) northeast of Dungiven. It lies in the Roe Valley, at the foot of Donald's Hill and at the edge of the Sperrins. Drumsurn had a population of 357 people in the 2001 Census. It is situated within Causeway Coast and Glens district.

== The Troubles in Drumsurn ==
During the Troubles, loyalist paramilitaries exploded a car bomb outside O’Connor's Supply House in the centre of the village on 26 July 1973. There was considerable damage but no casualties.

== Sport ==
- Drumsurn GAC is the local Gaelic Athletic Association club.

== Transport ==
- Drumsurn railway station opened on 4 July 1883, closed for passenger traffic on 1 January 1933 and finally closed altogether on 3 July 1950.

== Gallery ==
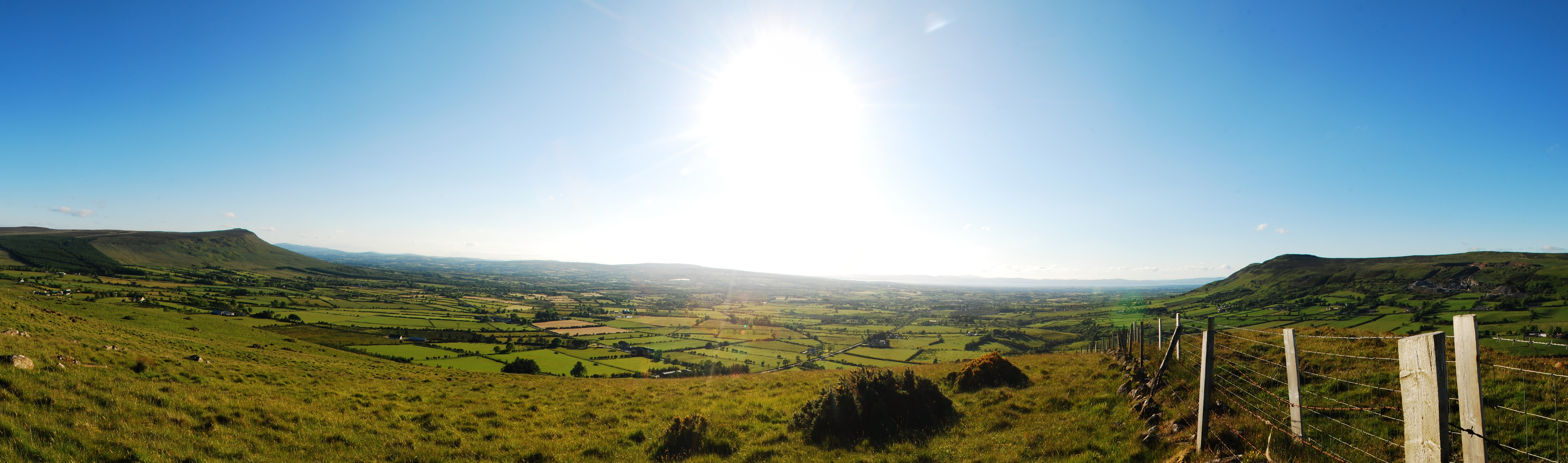
Panorama of Ballyness townland, 2 1/4 miles from Drumsurn.
