= William Heygate =

William Heygate may refer to:

- Sir William Heygate, 1st Baronet, British member of parliament
- William Unwin Heygate, British member of parliament
