= Londonderry and Coleraine Railway =

Railway line in Northern Ireland

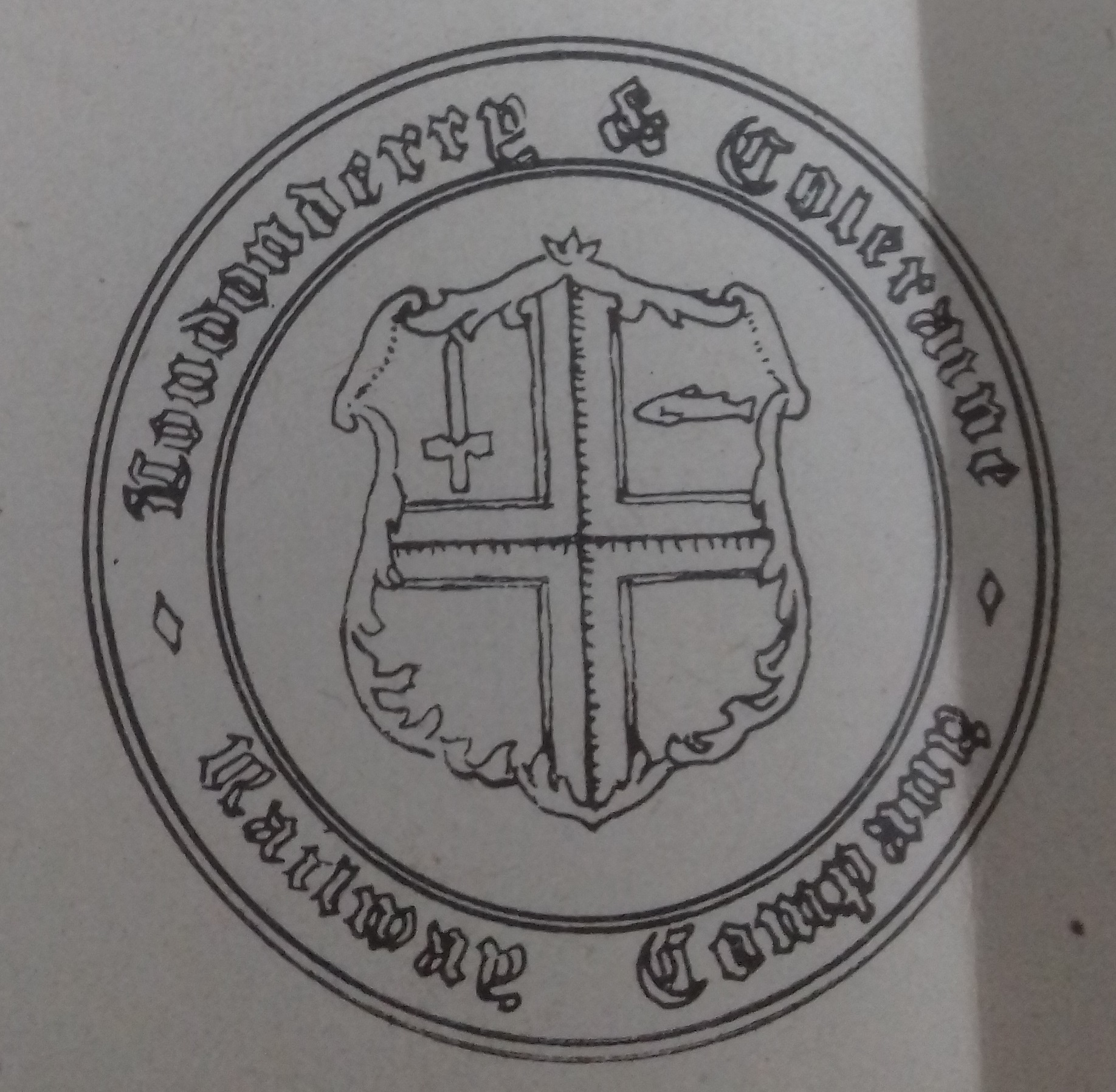
- Seal of the Londonderry & Coleraine Railway

Overview
- Termini: Londonderry Waterside; Coleraine
- Connecting lines: Ballymena, Ballymoney, Coleraine and Portrush Junction Railway

History
- Commenced: 1845
- Opened: stages 1852–1853
- Completed: 1853

Technical
- Track gauge: 5 ft 3 in (1,600 mm)

The Londonderry and Coleraine Railway is a railway line between the city of Derry and the town of Coleraine in County Londonderry, built by the Londonderry and Coleraine Railway Company (L&CR). The company operated the line independently for seven years before being absorbed into the Belfast & Northern Counties Railway. The line is still in use today by NI Railways and forms part of the Belfast to Derry-Londonderry main line.

== History ==
Londonderry and Coleraine Railway Act 1845
- Act of Parliament
- Parliament of the United Kingdom
- Long title: An Act for making a Railway from Londonderry to Coleraine, with a Branch to Newtown Limavady.
- Citation: 8 & 9 Vict. c. clxxxvii

Dates
- Royal assent: 4 August 1845

Other legislation
- Repealed by: Londonderry and Coleraine Railway Arrangements Act 1859

Status: Repealed

Text of statute as originally enacted

Londonderry and Coleraine Railway Arrangements Act 1859
- Act of Parliament
- Parliament of the United Kingdom
- Long title: An Act to facilitate Arrangements by the Londonderry and Coleraine Railway Company with their Creditors, and for other Purposes.
- Citation: 22 & 23 Vict. c. cxxxi

Dates
- Royal assent: 13 August 1859

The Londonderry and Coleraine Railway was incorporated by the Londonderry and Coleraine Railway Act 1845 (8 & 9 Vict. c. clxxxvii) and was opened in stages from 1852 to 1853. The company had nine years of independent railway operation before being acquired by the Belfast and Northern Counties Railway. Records of the company are sketchy and incomplete.

=== Construction ===
Despite being a relatively short line it required some considerable engineering works. The route starting from the Derry terminus on the east bank of the River Foyle. The line followed the river north and from where it flows into Lough Foyle the line follows south and east banks via Magilligan and Bellarena. At Magiligan an embankment was built for the railway line and about 22,000 acres reclaimed from Lough Foyle and the sea. Of the 22,000 acres 12,000 was set aside to cover the costs of the railway. The major engineering feature on the line is the two Downhill tunnels, whose construction began in June 1846. The blasting of the tunnels, the longer of which is 275 metres, attracted a crowd of up to 12,000. The blasting of the tunnels took 3600 lbs of gunpowder. When the tunnel was complete, a banquet for 500 people was held in it; the event became known locally as the Great Blast.

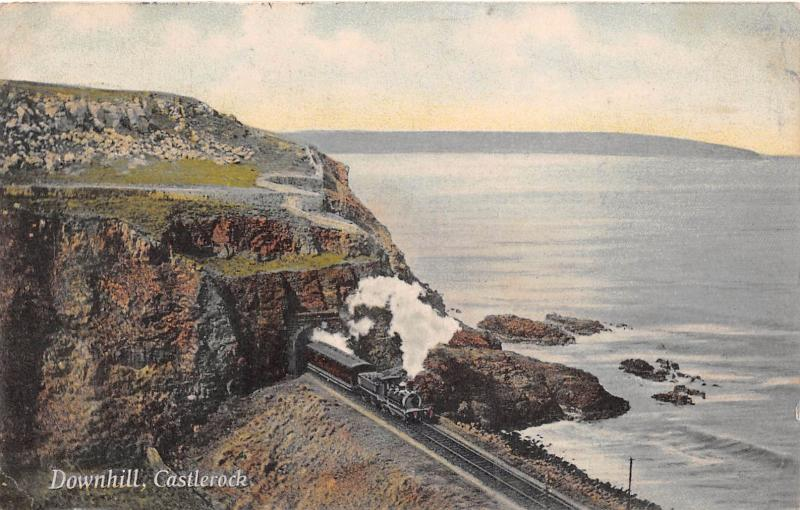
a postcard showing the tunnel at Downhill from around 1905

In 1852 the first sections of the railway between Londonderry and Limavady were ready for use. The Board of Trade authorised the opening of the line to goods traffic in October but were initially reluctant to authorise passenger traffic. Eventually authorisation was given by the end of December that year. Work on the line continued towards Coleraine from Broharris Junction four miles from Limavady.

From the mouth of Lough Foyle the line went east before following the River Bann into Coleraine. Initially the line terminated on the west bank of the Bann. In 1855 the Ballymena, Ballymoney, Coleraine and Portrush Junction Railway (BBC&PJR) opened which along with the Belfast and Ballymena Railway provided a rail link between Derry and Belfast. As there was no bridge over the Bann passengers and goods had to change stations at Coleraine. In November 1860 a viaduct across the Bann was opened finally allowing through traffic between Derry and Belfast.

=== Branch lines ===
As well as the mainline between Londonderry and Coleraine there were some small branch lines. The first branch from the small town of Magilligan to Magiligan Point. Magilligan Point is a promontory in the mouth of Lough Foyle, and it was hoped a ferry service from here to County Donegal could be established and thus be an extra source of traffic. The four-and-a-half-mile line was built without parliamentary approval and appears to have been opened without Board of Trade authorisation in June/July 1855. It appears that it was unprofitable and was closed by October 1855 making it the shortest-lived passenger rail line in Ireland. Ironically a seasonal ferry service between Magilligan Point and County Donegal is in operation today.

When the line opened between Londonderry and Limavady in 1852, construction work towards Coleraine started four miles from Limavady station. When the line opened in 1853 this required trains going to Coleraine via Limavady to reverse onto the mainline. Thus a junction station was constructed in 1852 and Limavady became a branch. The Limavady and Dungiven Railway Company (acquired by NCC 1907) built a 10-mile extension from Limavady to Dungiven in 1873 being completed in 1883. The line was worked from the outset by the BNCR (who acquired the Londonderry and Coleraine) as part of the Limavady branch. The branch was completely closed to passengers in 1950 with goods ceasing in 1955. Despite the loss of its branch, Limavady Junction remained open to mainline trains until 1976.

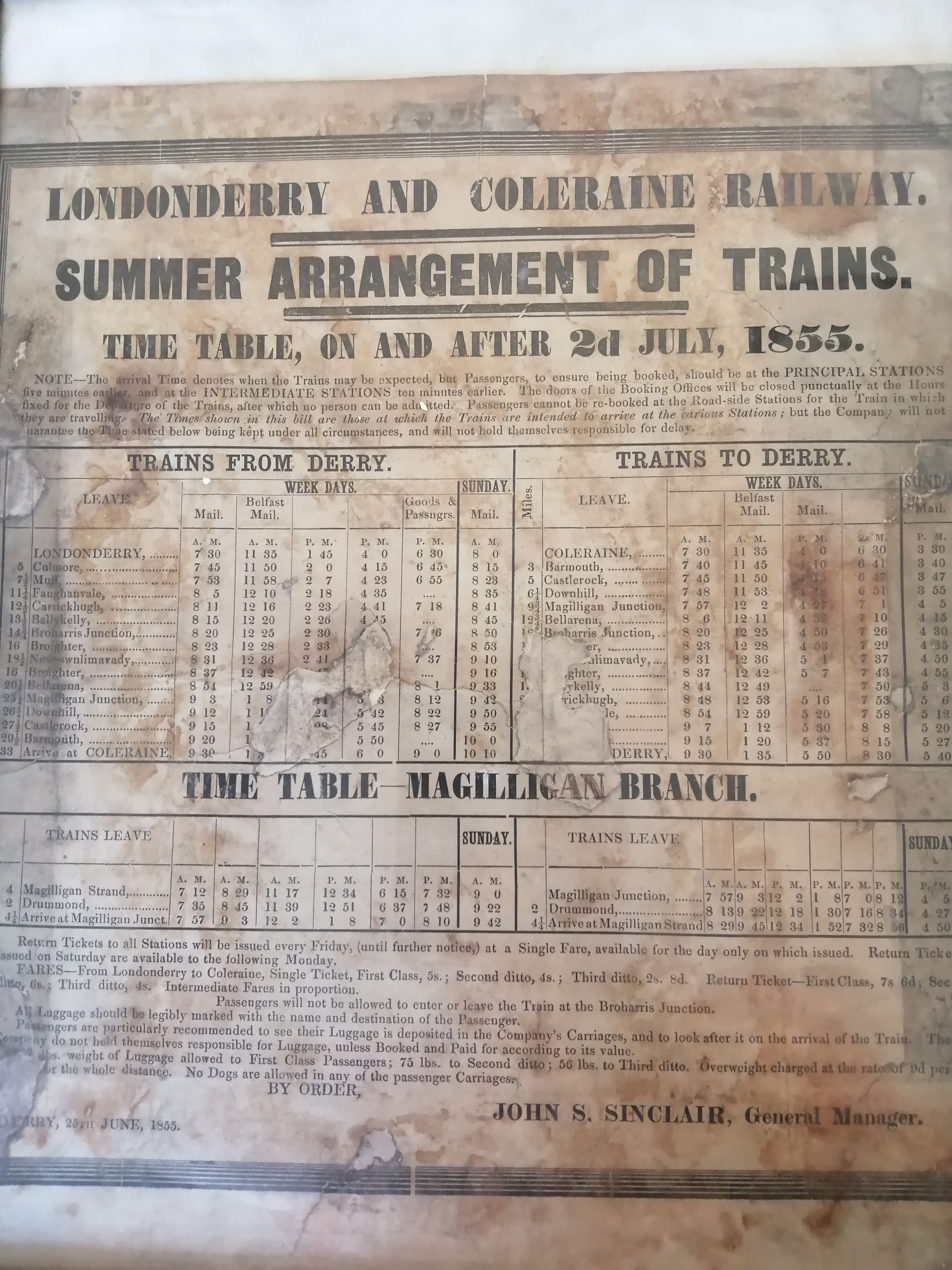
1855 timetable depicting train times for the Magilligan branch. Interestingly it also show that Limavady has not yet become a branch and is still being served by mainline trains.

=== Amalgamation ===
Londonderry and Coleraine Railway (Sale) Act 1871
- Act of Parliament
- Parliament of the United Kingdom
- Long title: An Act for authorising the Sale of the Londonderry and Coleraine Railway to the Belfast and Northern Counties Railway Company; and for other purposes.
- Citation: 34 & 35 Vict. c. clxviii

Dates
- Royal assent: 24 July 1871

Text of statute as originally enacted

The L&CR struggled financially, and from 1861 the line was leased to the growing Belfast and Northern Counties Railway (BNCR). This saw the closure of Coleraine Waterside Station with services from Derry running into the BNCR station in Coleraine on the other side of the river. Eventually the BNCR agreed to buy the L&CR, with the Londonderry and Coleraine Railway (Sale) Act 1871 (34 & 35 Vict. c. clxviii) ending the line's independent existence. The railway continued as part of the main line between Belfast and Londonderry for the BNCR and its successors. The BNCR invested in the line and constructed a new terminus in Londonderry in 1874, which despite being abandoned in favour of a smaller terminus between 1980 and 2019,is still in use today.

The BNCR was acquired by the Midland Railway in 1903, becoming the Northern Counties Committee (NCC). The NCC found itself in London, Midland and Scottish Railway (LMS) ownership following the grouping of Britain's Railways in 1921, and later the Railway Executive after nationalisation in 1948. It was acquired by the Ulster Transport Authority (UTA) in 1949, then in 1967 by Northern Ireland Railways who continue to run the line.

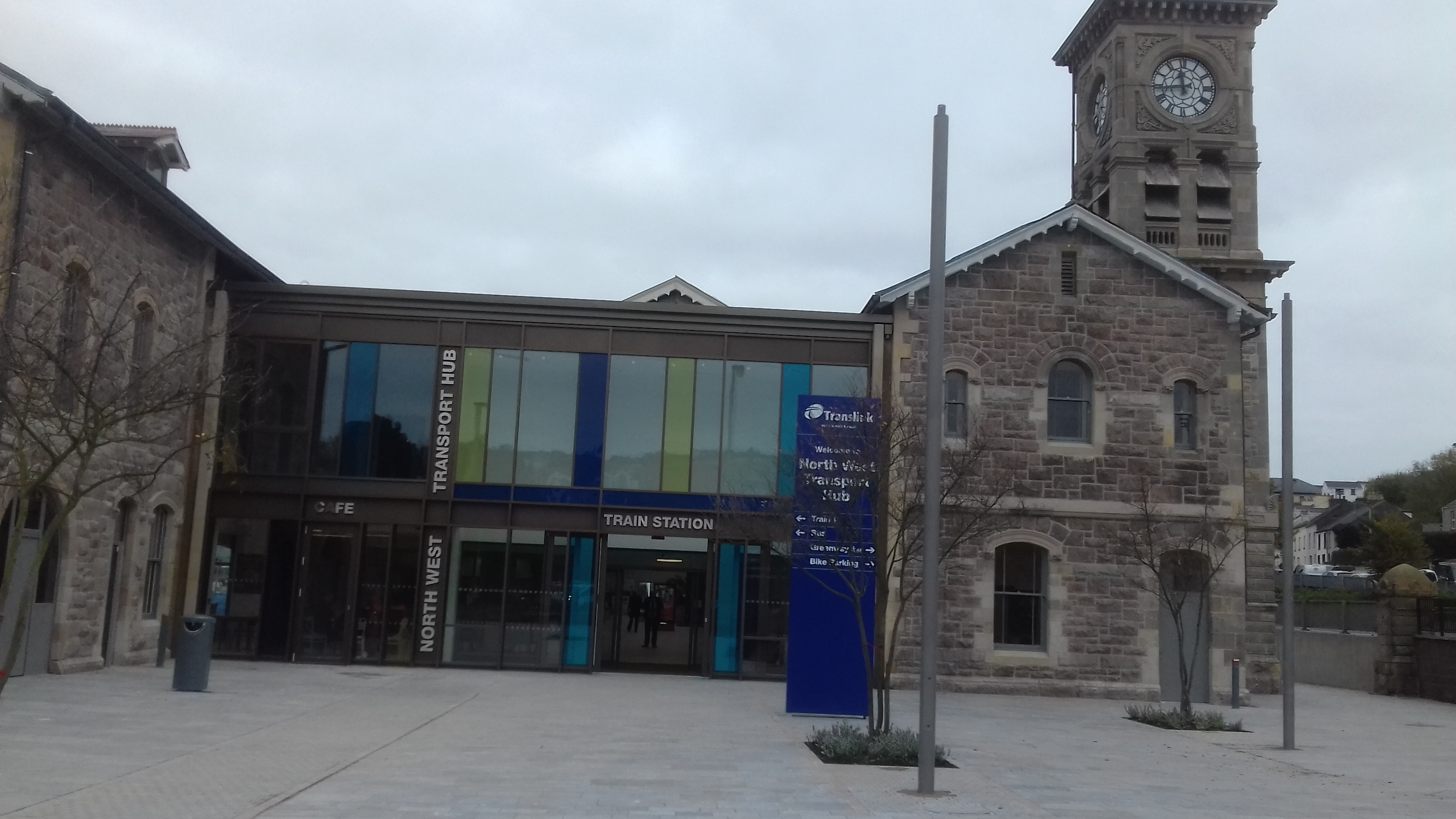
The station in Londonderry built by the BNCR

== Stations ==
Today there are four stations on the line, Londonderry, Bellarena, Castlerock and Coleraine; however, many more stations came and went over time. Some of the former stations on the line are still standing and have been turned into private residences. Many of the L&CR stations were basic platform halts, however when the line passed into BNCR ownership the architect John Lanyon rebuilt many between 1874 and 1875, most notably the waterside terminus in Derry which is still in use.

=== Londonderry – Coleraine Main Line ===
List of stations on the Derry–Coleraine rail line
Station Name	Opened	Closed	Past Names	Remarks
Derry~Londonderry	1852/2019	1980	Londonderry Waterside	Rebuilt by John Lanyon in 1874 Closed in 1980 but reopened 2019
Londonderry	1980	2019		built to replace the original station replaced by original station following renovation in 2019
Lisahally	1940s	1940s		Second World War military halt
Culmore	1853	1973		
Eglinton	1852	1973	Muff	Renamed in 1853 after the village changed its name new building erect by John Lanyon 1874 and 1875
Longfield	1940s	1940s		Second World War military halt
Faughanvale	1853	1859		
Carrichue	1852	1954		
Ballykelly	1852	1954		
Drennan's Farm	1940s	1940s		Second World War military halt
Limavady Junction	1853	1976	1853–1861 Junction 1861–1875 Newtown Junction	New buildings built by John Lanyon in 1875 ceased functioning as junction for Limavady in 1950
Bellarena	1853/1982	1976/2016		Buildings designed by John Lanyon built in 1873 and 1875 closed in 1976 but was reopened in 1982 Station building is a private residence
Bellarena	2016			new station with twin platform passing loop opened 2019 opened by Queen Elizabeth II located on other side of level crossing from old station of same name
Magilligan	1853	1976		short-lived junction for branch to Magilligan point in 1855 buildings built between 1873 and 1875 by John Lanyon facilitated visits to HMP Magilligan building is a private residence
Umbra	1855	1861		only ever served as request stop
Downhill	1853	1973		buildings erected in 1874 by John Lanyon
Castlerock	1853			buildings erected in 1874 by John Lanyon signal box rebuilt 1970s The last signalbox in Northern Ireland to use mechanical signals and tokens signal boc closed in 2016
Barmouth	1855	1856		considerable distance from nearby village building in use as private residence
Coleraine Waterside	1853	1861		Original L&CR terminus in Coleraine became through station in 1861 following the river Bann being bridged providing link to Coleraine Station closed in favour of Ballymena, Ballymoney, Coleraine and Portrush Junction Railway Coleraine Station
Coleraine	1855			Buildings built in 1855 by Charles Lanyon. Buildings provided on east side of tracks in 1880s Currently functions as a joint train and bus station

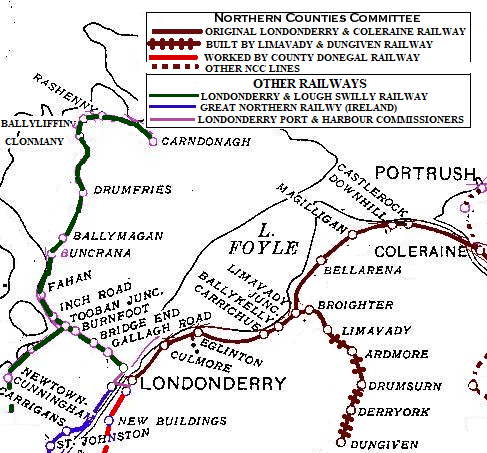
Map of the Londonderry and Coleraine Railway in 1906 depicting stations and other nearby lines

=== Limavady Branch ===
List of Station on the Limavady Junction – Dungiven Rail Line
Station Name	Opened	Closed	Past names	Remarks
Limavady Junction	1853	1950	1853–1861 Junction 1861–1875 Newtown Junction	New buildings built by John Lanyon in 1875 Continued as a through station on Derry – Coleraine line until 1976
Broighter	1852	1950		Stop not advertised between 1920 and 1934
Limavady	1852	1950	1852–1870 Newtownlimavady	Terminus of the Line from Londonderry 1852–1853
Ardmore	1883	1933		Opened by Limavady & Dungiven Railway Company
Drumsurn	1883	1933		Opened by Limavady & Dungiven Railway Company
Derryork	1883	1933		Opened by Limavady & Dungiven Railway Company
Dungiven	1883	1933		Opened by Limavady & Dungiven Railway Company

=== Magilligan Point Branch ===
List of Stations on Magilligan – Magilligan Point Tramway
Station Name	Opened	Closed	Past Names	Remarks
Magilligan	1853	1855		Continued as a station on Derry – Coleraine line until 1976
Drummond	1855	1855		
Magilligan Point	1855	1855		

== Locomotives and Motive Power ==
Forming part of the main line between Derry and Belfast, the Londonderry and Coleraine Railway has seen the some of Northern Ireland's classic express engines on its rails. Likewise its branch line to Limavady has also seen some of the smaller locomotives associated with the NCC. Following nationalisation the line was converted to diesel traction and today both of NIR's classes of DMU can be found working the line.

=== Londonderry and Coleraine Railway Company ===
During the early period of L&CR ownership the company operated a variety of both second hand locomotives and new engines specifically built for them. The L&CR frequently exchanged locomotives with the neighbouring Londonderry & Enniskillen Railway (a predecessor to the Great Northern Railway). The company is not well renowned for its motive power and many of the locomotives were under powered and not suited to the line. Of the locomotives specifically built for the company these were five 2-2-0 Well Tank locomotives, and 0-4-2 and a 2-4-0. The 2-4-0 was of Robert Stephenson specification and built by Longridge and was initially loaned to the Londonderry & Enniskillen in 1847. The 2-2-0 tank engines were of NB Adams patent and built by Sharp, Stewart & Company. The order for these locos was for six however before delivery one was sent to Dublin for the International Dublin Exhibition of 1853, where it was sold to the Newry and Enniskillen Railway and thus never worked on the line. These engines were unsuitable for a line the size of the Londonderry and Coleraine Railway being under powered and unstable. Being outside cylinder locos they were unstable at speed and one lurched off the track in 1855 resulting in one fatality. As such a common practise was to couple two engines back to back. The 0-4-2 was built in 1859 by Grendon, the company also ordered another 2-4-0 from fairbairn but this arrived in 1860 after the BNCR take over and so never ran on the line under L&CR ownership. The company also bought two 2-2-2WTs from the BBC&PJR.

=== Belfast & Northern Counties Railway ===
See Northern Counties Committee

Nine L&CR engines joined the BNCR fleet when it acquired the line. It had no significant influence on the future locomotive policy of the BNCR and most of these inherited locomotives were withdrawn before 1900. The BNCR used 2-4-0 locomotives for passenger trains and 0-6-0 locomotives for goods trains. They were mainly built by Sharp, Stewart & Company and Beyer, Peacock & Company.

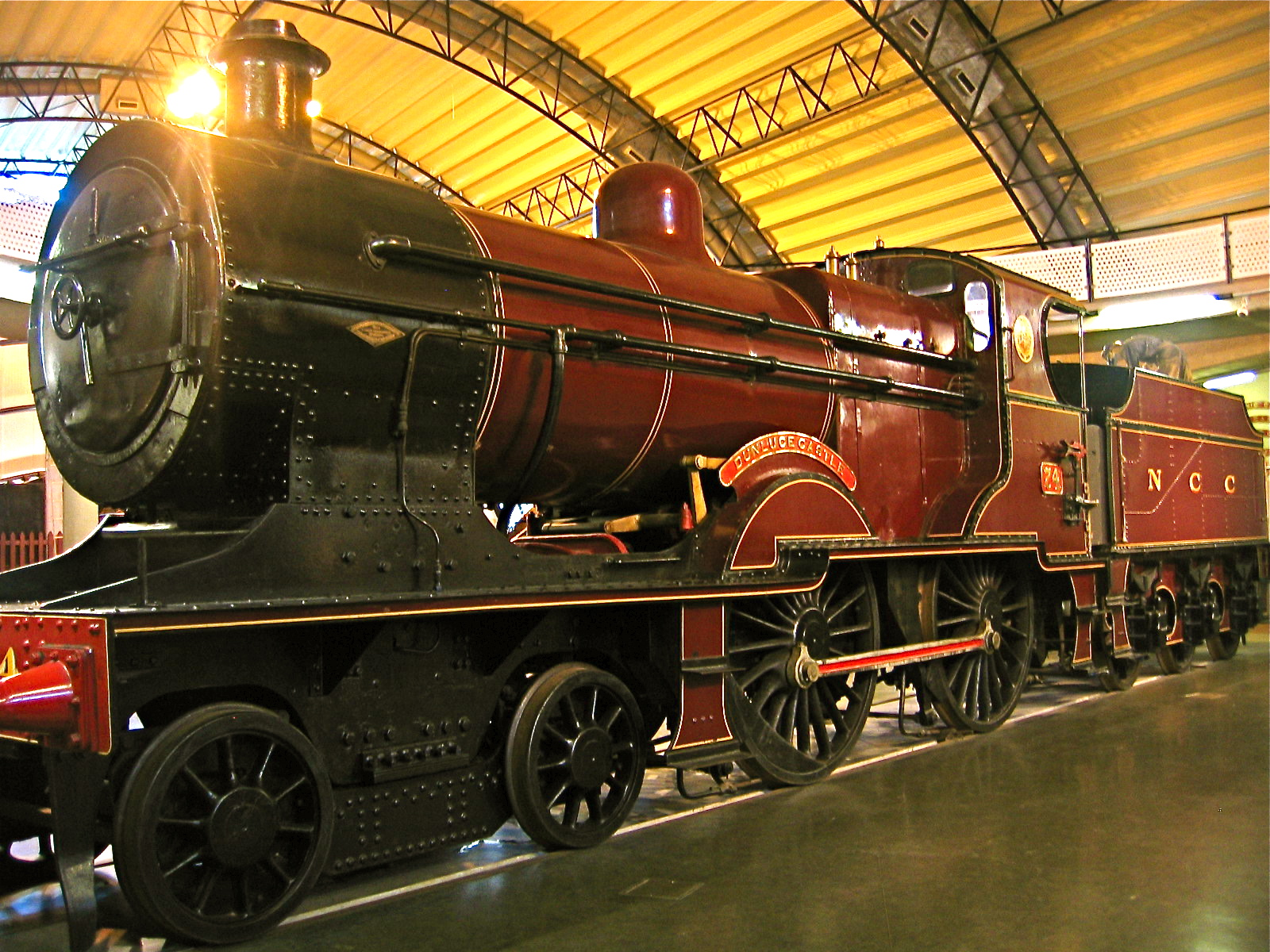
U2 Class locomotive Number 74 "Dunluce Castle" in the Ulster Folk & Transport Museum

Under the locomotive Superintendent Bowman Malcolm, the company experimented with compounding and many of these locomotives survived into NCC ownership. This company was also the first in the world to fit its locomotives with Ross "pop" safety valves invented by R L Ross from Coleraine. This invention would see wide use on British locomotives as well as some of those used overseas.

=== Northern Counties Committee ===
Under Midland Railway ownership the policy remained largely independent and the building compounds continued. There was also wider use of the 4-4-0 wheel arrangement for passenger locomotives the company owning twenty engines of this wheel arrangement by 1920.

Under LMS ownership a modernisation and standardisation program was introduced, with locomotives built during this period having more of a Midland and LMS influence with the LMS' Derby Works building engines as well as the NCC shops at York Road, Belfast. Some contracts also went to outside locomotive companies; the U2 class 4-4-0 is a good example of this, with some of the class being built at York Road, some at Derby and some by North British Locomotive Company in Glasgow. In 1933 the largest NCC engines began to appear, these were the W Class 2-6-0s and were largely based LMS Fowler 2-6-4Ts. This design was followed by a tank engine version in 1946, the 2-6-4T WT class. Both of which were highly successful.

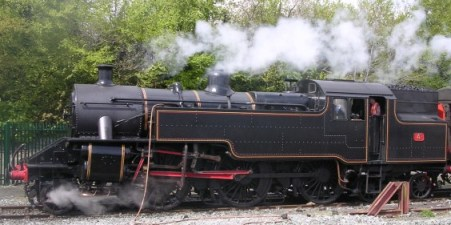
NCC WT Class loco No. 4

=== Ulster Transport Authority ===
See NI Railways

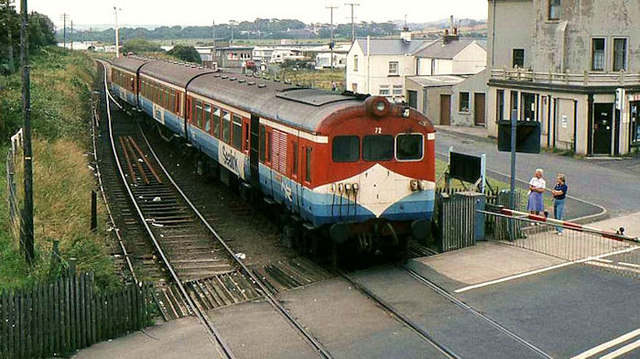
Class 70 led by power car 72 on an NIR "Sealink" liveried train at Castlerock on 11 August 1984

While Diesel Railcars and Multiple Units (DMU) had been experimented with by the NCC, the UTA developed the process further, developing the Multi Engined Diesel (MED) in 1952. Commonly referred to as in Ireland as railcars it was found these DMUs were not suited to long-distance services like the Derry line, the UTA redeveloped the concept and introduced the Multi Purpose Diesel (MPD) in 1957. These railcars were built specifically with the line to Londonderry in mind with the first 10 being allocated for express services between that city and Belfast. The railways of the UTA suffered neglect from government as a result many MPDs were (as were the earlier MEDs) constructed from older coach bodies and frames. Originally these railcars used 275 hp (205 kW) Leyland engine, mounted beneath the chassis; however, they were later refurbished in the 1960s with recycled engines from the former ex GNR(I) AEC railcars and new 275 hp engines from Rolls-Royce.
While the MPDs were cheap to build and economical to run they were somewhat lacking in passenger comfort compared to locomotive hauled coaches. The UTA designed a DMU which unlike earlier generations of railcars did not place the engine under the floor of a passenger coach but placed it in a specific compartment in the driving vehicle behind the cab. The Class 70 was introduced in 1966. Fitted with a 550 hp (410 kW) English Electric engine they would remain in service until 1986. Under the UTA diesel traction would take over the bulk of the traffic on the Derry line, however steam locomotives continued on the line until the end of the 1960s.

=== Northern Ireland Railways ===
NIR inherited the railway system of the UTA including the Londonderry and Coleraine line in 1967 and continued in the development of DMUs. The Class 80 was a furthering of the concept conceived with the Class 70 and were very similar both mechanically and electrically. It was developed using British Rail Mk2b body shells with a 560 hp English Electric engine. The class was intended to replace the ageing MPD and ex GNRI railcar inherited from the UTA. The class is arguably one of the most successful types of train to run in Ireland north or south and gave NIR many years of service in difficult times. Examples of the class 80 (affectionately nicknamed 'thumpers') remained in passenger service until 2011 with a small number continuing to work sandite trains until 2017.

From 1985 the Class 70s were replaced with the 450 (Castle) Class DMUs built by BREL. They were constructed using the frames of MK1 coaches and the bodyshells of MK3s. They reused the power units of the Class 70s they replaced. Although intended mainly for short branch lines they did occasionally find themselves on services on the Derry line. The last castle was withdrawn in 2012.

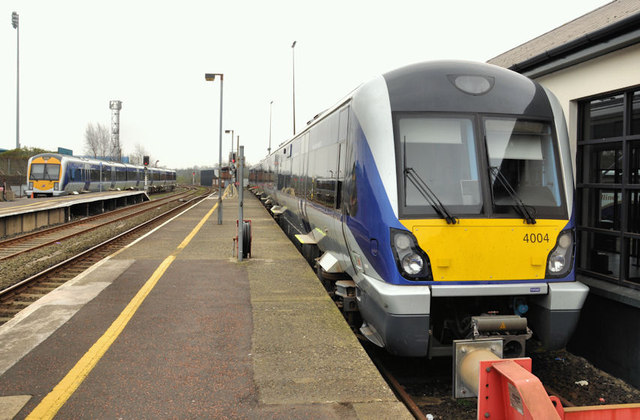
Class 4000 No4004 stabled at Coleraine with a Class 3000 in the siding on the left

The first of NIR's 3000 Class DMUs were introduced in 2005. This class was part of a major investment intended to replace the ageing Class 80 'thumpers.' These three car DMUs were built by CAF and fitted with MAN diesel engines giving them a speed of up to 90 mph (140 km/h). Class 4000 DMUs also built by CAF were acquired from 2011 to completely replace the remaining class 80s and the entire 450 Class. They are externally similar to the 3000 class in appearance but are fitted with an MTU 390 kW (520 hp) engine, they also have fewer seating bays in favour of more standing room and only one toilet compared with the two on the 3000s. Like the 3000s they are 3-car units however NIR is purchasing an extra 21 carriages to turn seven of the class into 6-car units.

== Accidents ==
In the over 150-year history of the line there have been relatively few accidents however the line has not been immune from them.

- 24 April 1855 – A train consisting of four carriages hauled by one of the 2-2-0 tank engines overturned on a curve at Rosses Bay just outside Londonderry killing the driver. The design of the engine was criticised.
- 27 June 1856 – An elderly user of a level crossing lost their legs after being stuck by a train at low speed at Bellarena. The gates were unmanned as the keeper was assisting watering a locomotive.
- 31 December 1858 – Goods train mistakenly directed into siding at Magilligan. The locomotive had been propelling its wagons in front of it which is usually considered an unsafe practise, ironically had it however been pulling them the accident could have been worse.
- 2 February 1875 – Collision at Coleraine. unknown injuries and fatalities
- 28 September 1887 – A track defect the result of inadequate maintenance caused a train to derail near the Bann Bridge outside Coleraine.
- 4 June 2002 – Landslide at Downhill causing boulders to fall onto the track resulted in a derailment injuring 12 people. Netting has since been installed on the surrounding cliffs to prevent a similar event from happening in the future
- 2 August 2007 – Train collided with tractor on a user worked crossing between two parts of a farm near Limavady Junction.

== Legacy ==
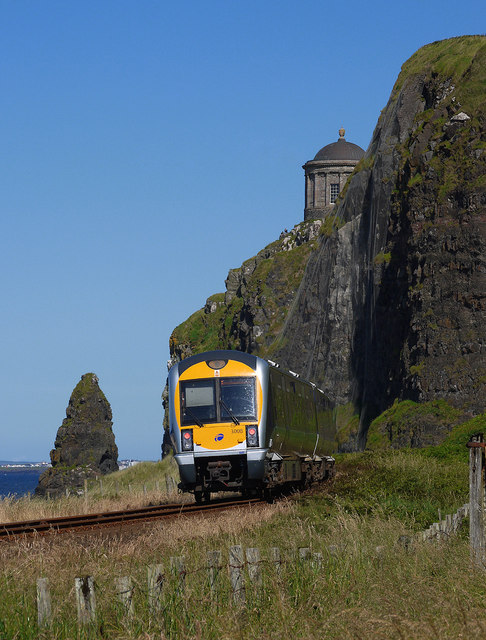
3000 class DMU approaching Downhill

The line is regarded for its scenic views of the coastal views from the train taking in Downhill beach and cliffs, Binevenagh and the Foyle estuary. It was famously described by Michael Palin as "one of the most beautiful rail journeys in the world" and in 2016 was listed 7th in Country Living's "10 most breathtaking railway journeys across the UK" ahead of the luxury chartered British Pullman.

One of the line's early claims to fame is that the locomotive engineer Robert Fairlie served as the Locomotive Superintendent of the Londonderry and Coleraine Company from 1852. It is speculated that Fairlie may have gotten the idea for his Double Fairlie design from the L&CR practise of coupling the 2-2-0 tank engines back to back.
