= Ballykelly railway station =

Railway station in County Londonderry, Northern Ireland

Ballykelly

General information
- Location: Ballykelly, County Londonderry; Northern Ireland
- Coordinates: 55.0541°N 7.0384°W
- Platforms: 2

Other information
- Status: Disused

History
- Original company: Londonderry and Coleraine Railway
- Pre-grouping: Belfast and Northern Counties Railway
- Post-grouping: Ulster Transport Authority

Key dates
- 29 December 1852: Station opens
- 20 September 1954: Station closes
Location

Ballykelly railway station served the villages of Ballykelly and Walworth in County Londonderry in Northern Ireland.

The Londonderry and Coleraine Railway opened the station on 29 December 1852.

It closed on 20 September 1954.

Northern Ireland Railways are currently constructing a new passing loop at Ballykelly to help increase service frequency on the Belfast-Derry railway line.

There have been calls to reopen the station at Ballykelly, given its proximity to Limavady.

== Routes ==
Preceding station	NI Railways	Following station
Limavady Junction	Ulster Transport Authority; Belfast-Derry	Carrichue
	Historical railways	
Limavady Junction; Line open, station closed	Londonderry and Coleraine Railway; Coleraine-L'Derry	Carrichue; Line open, station closed
