= John Heygate =

Northern Irish writer

Sir John Edward Nourse Heygate, 4th Baronet (19 April 1903 – 18 March 1976), was a Northern Irish journalist and novelist.

He is chiefly remembered for his liaison with Evelyn Gardner, which began in 1929, when she was married to Evelyn Waugh. He is portrayed as "John Beaver" in Waugh's A Handful of Dust, as "Maltravers" in Anthony Powell's Agents and Patients and as "Sir Piers Tofield" in Henry Williamson's Chronicle of Ancient Sunlight.

== Background ==
Heygate was the son of Arthur Heygate, an Eton College housemaster and the third son of the second Heygate baronet, and Frances née Harvey. He was educated at Eton and Balliol College, Oxford, graduating with a Bachelor of Arts degree. In 1926 he went to Heidelberg as a trainee for the Foreign Office. He subsequently got a job as an assistant news editor at the BBC.

In the late 1920s Heygate was on the fringes of the group of socialites known as the "Bright Young People" and was friends with the author Anthony Powell. In 1929 divorce proceedings began between Evelyn Waugh and the Honourable Evelyn Gardner (a daughter of the 1st Baron Burghclere). Heygate was cited and hence was forced to resign from the BBC. (This scandal is said to be one reason why the BBC's first director general, Lord Reith, took a firm line against any of his staff being involved in a divorce.) In 1930 he married Gardner.

In 1932 he joined the Gaumont-British Picture Corporation and worked in collaboration with the German UFA film company at their Babelsberg Studio near Berlin. Of staunch right-wing views, he was present at the 1935 Nuremberg Rally in the company of his friend the writer Henry Williamson. In neighbouring seats were Unity Mitford, Diana Mitford and Dr. Frank Buchman.

Heygate and Gardner were divorced in 1936. In February of the same year, he remarried, to the Gaumont-British actress Gwyneth Lloyd (of the Lloyds Bank family). They subsequently moved to Sussex. They had two sons, George and Richard, both of whom eventually inherited the Heygate baronetcy.

Despite his political sympathies he served as a bombardier in the Royal Artillery during the Second World War. He wrote the book These Germans, published in 1940.

He succeeded his uncle as baronet on 14 January 1940. Heygate and Lloyd divorced in 1947. He married again in 1951, to Dora Harvey. She died in 1968. By the 1970s he was living alone in Bellarena, County Londonderry.

In 1976 Heygate committed suicide by shooting himself. He was 72.

== Works ==
=== Books ===
His books comprise:

- Decent Fellows (1930), a public school novel.
- White Angel (1934)
- Talking Picture (Jonathan Cape, 1934), a semi-autobiographical novel dealing with experiences in Weimar Berlin, similar to Christopher Isherwood's I Am a Camera.
- Motor Tramp (Jonathan Cape, 1935), a factual account of tours in an MG motor car, including a visit to Nazi Germany.
- A House for Joanna (1937). A tale of life on the Sussex coast.
- These Germans: An estimate of their character seen in flashes from the drama, 1918–1939 (1940)
- Love and Death (1943)
- Kurumba (Eyre & Spottiswoode, 1949). Described as: A raffish, intelligent tale of a soldier and his native mistress, set in the imaginary Kurumba, somewhere on the Indian sub-continent, during the second world war.

=== Screenplays ===
Heygate is credited as a co-writer on the following films, made in Germany and starring Lilian Harvey:

- The Only Girl (Ich und die Kaiserin) (1934)
- Black Roses (Schwarze Rosen) (1935)

Baronetage of the United Kingdom
Preceded by Frederick Heygate	Baronet (of Southend); 1940–1976	Succeeded by George Heygate
