= Eglinton railway station (Northern Ireland) =

Railway station in County Londonderry, Northern Ireland

Eglinton
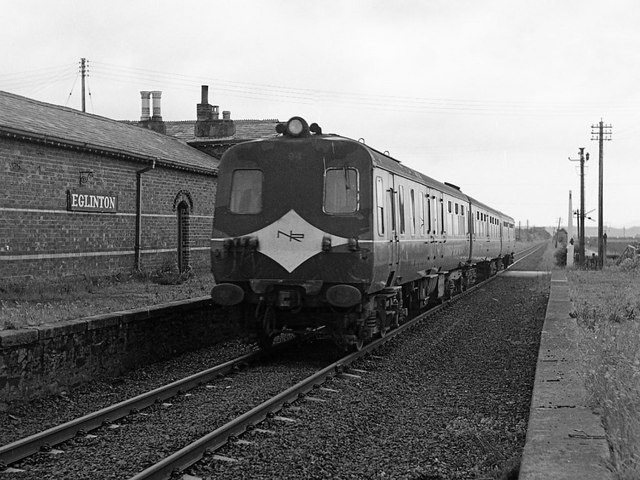
- NIR 80 Class train passing through Eglinton station in 1979

General information
- Location: Eglinton, County Londonderry; Northern Ireland
- Coordinates: 55.0505°N 7.1847°W

Other information
- Status: Disused

History
- Original company: Londonderry and Coleraine Railway
- Pre-grouping: Belfast and Northern Counties Railway
- Post-grouping: Northern Ireland Railways

Key dates
- 29 November 1852: Station opens as Willsborough
- 1 October 1853: Station renamed Muff
- 1 February 1854: Station renamed Eglinton
- 1873–1875: New station buildings erected
- 2 July 1973: Station closes. (Regular services had ceased on 15 March 1971 but the station remained "available for use as required"
Location
- Location within Northern Ireland

Eglinton railway station served the village of Eglinton in County Londonderry in Northern Ireland.

The Londonderry and Coleraine Railway opened the station as Willsborough on 29 November 1852. It was renamed Muff on 1 October 1853, and Eglinton on 1 February 1854.

New station buildings were erected between 1873 and 1875 to designs by the architect John Lanyon.

It closed on 2 July 1973.

== Routes ==
Preceding station	NI Railways	Following station
Limavady Junction	Northern Ireland Railways; Belfast-Derry	Culmore
	Historical railways	
Faughanvale; Line open, station closed	Londonderry and Coleraine Railway; Coleraine-Derry	Culmore; Line open, station closed

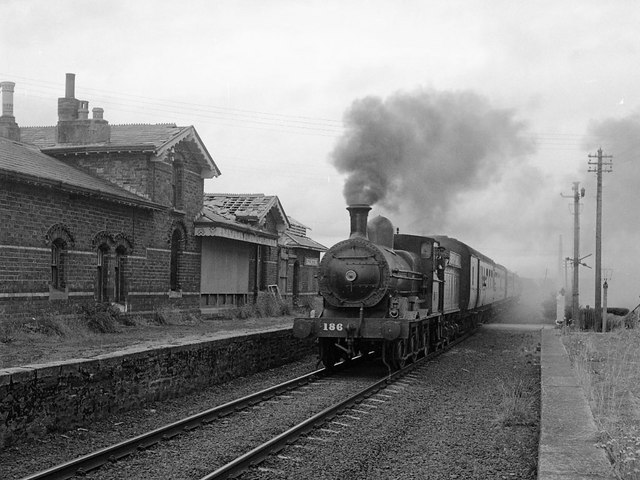
Steam train passing through Eglinton station on 1 September 1979

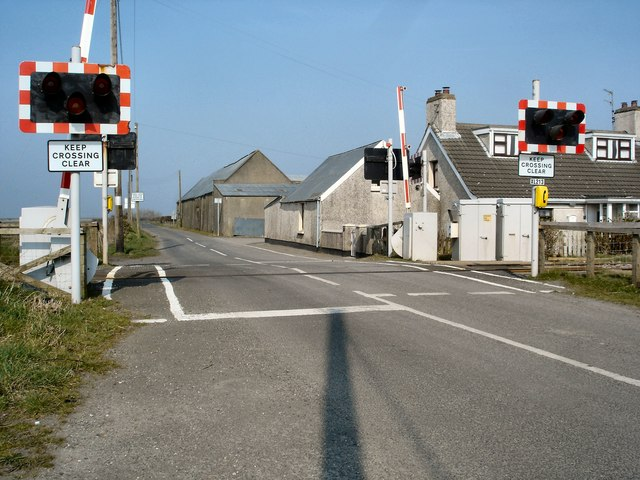
Level crossing in Eglinton in 2007

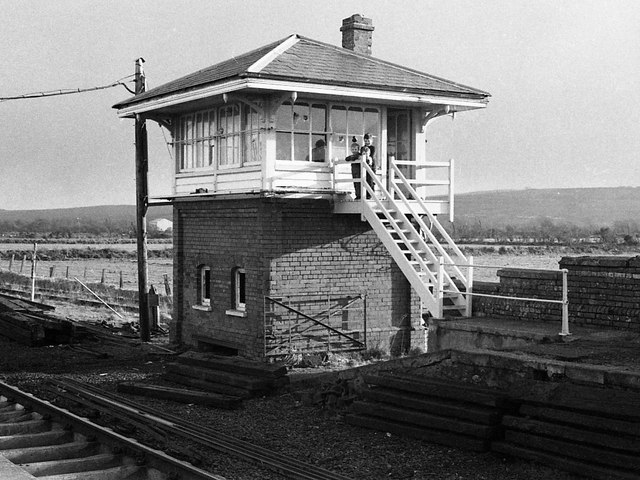
Eglinton Signal Cabin in 1975
