= Richard Heygate =

Sir Richard John Gage Heygate, 6th Baronet (born 1940) is a businessman and writer. As a businessman, he is chiefly known for being part of the team which created the world's first on-line ATM and for a long career as a McKinsey & Company partner. As a writer, he has co-authored two books about England published by John Murray.

== Career ==
Richard Heygate is the son of Sir John Heygate, a writer, and Gwyneth Lloyd, a Gaumont-British film actress. He was educated at Repton School and Balliol College, Oxford.

After leaving Oxford Richard Heygate joined IBM in its Banking Division and led the team that created the first on-line ATM for Lloyds Bank. The Bank itself was built by his maternal grandfather, Howard Lloyd, in the 19th century. After IBM, he began a long career in Management Consultancy McKinsey in two separate periods, during the second of which he was elected a partner.

In the middle of this career, he resigned to run the family estates in Bellarena, Northern Ireland. He created a modern food factory and exported luxury products, such as smoked salmon, throughout the world. A local newspaper in Port-au-Prince dubbed him "Le Roi de Saumon Fume".

Richard Heygate has published a number of articles in his company's business journal, the McKinsey Quarterly. Most recently, he has been involved in writing, TV and radio, including

- The Bart and the Bounder (BBC2, air date 28 Feb 2006)
- Endangered Species (Hardback 2007), (Paperback 2008)
- The Book of English Magic (Hardback 2009), (Paperback 2010), (US edition 2010)

Baronetage of the United Kingdom
Preceded by George Heygate	Baronet (of Southend); 1991–present	Incumbent
