= Benedict Nightingale =

British journalist and theatre critic

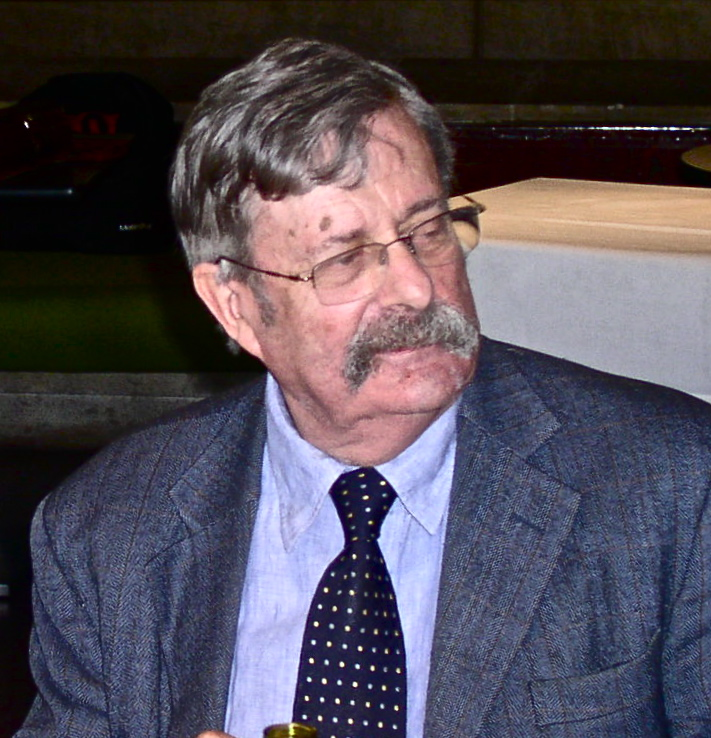
- At a Critics' Circle lunch in April 2010
- Born: William Benedict Herbert Nightingale; 14 May 1939 (age 87); Paddington, London, England
- Education: Charterhouse School
- Alma mater: Magdalene College, Cambridge
- Occupations: Journalist, critic
- Spouse: Anne Redmon
- Children: 3
- Parent(s): Evelyn Gardner; Ronald Nightingale
- Writing career
- Genre: Theatre criticism

William Benedict Herbert Nightingale (born 14 May 1939) is a British journalist, formerly a regular theatre critic for The Times newspaper. He was educated at Charterhouse and Magdalene College, Cambridge. His first published theatre review was for the Tunbridge Wells Advertiser in 1957, a production of Look Back in Anger by a local amateur group.

He worked for The Guardian as a reporter, and in 1969 was appointed drama critic of the New Statesman in London, a post that he held until 1986 when he was appointed Professor of English with special reference to Drama at the University of Michigan, Ann Arbor. He spent the whole of the 1983–84 season in New York, writing a series of Sunday theatre columns for The New York Times. His diary of the period was first published by Times Books in 1986 as Fifth Row Center: A Critic's Year On and Off Broadway. He was appointed chief theatre critic for The Times in London in 1990, in succession to Irving Wardle.

After two decades at The Times, on 1 June 2010, Nightingale was replaced by journalist Libby Purves. This, its consequences and Nightingale's career as a critic were discussed by Mark Shenton in his 26 January 2010 theatre blog for The Stage.

In 2010, Nightingale published a novel, What's So Flinking Bunny: The Spoonerisms and Misadventures of Tristram Throstlethwaite. In 2012, he published Great Moments in the Theatre, which examined some of what he considered the greatest moments in the history of the artform, from Aeschylus' Oresteia to Jez Butterworth's Jerusalem.

Nightingale has contributed to many newspapers and journals, including Encounter, London Magazine, The Wall Street Journal, The Daily Telegraph, The Independent, Punch, The Sunday Times, and The Observer. He also appeared on radio and television.

== Family ==
Nightingale is the son of Ronald Nightingale, an estate agent, and Evelyn Florence Margaret Winifred Gardner, whom he wed in 1937; she had previously been married to the writer Evelyn Waugh. Benedict Nightingale has a sister, the landscape architect Virginia Nightingale.
