= Evelyn Gardner =

British socialite, child of Herbert Gardner

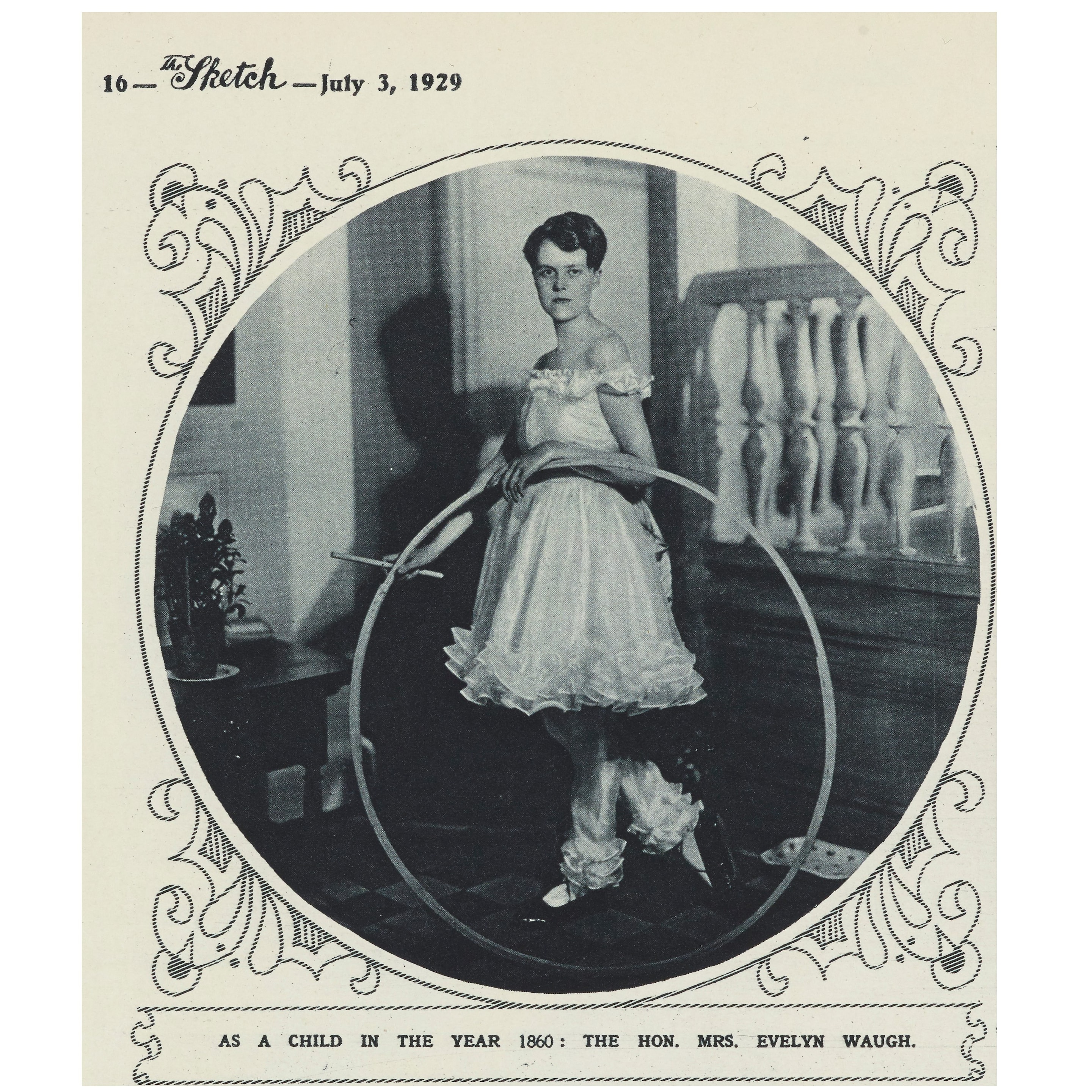
- Born: The Hon. Evelyn Florence Margaret Winifred Gardner; 27 September 1903; London, England
- Died: 11 March 1994 (aged 90); Ticehurst, Sussex, England
- Spouses: Evelyn Waugh (m. 1928; div. 1929) John Heygate (m. 1930; div. 1936) Ronald Nightingale (m. 1937)
- Children: 2, including Benedict Nightingale

Evelyn Florence Margaret Winifred Gardner (27 September 1903 – 11 March 1994) was the first wife of Evelyn Waugh. She was one of the Bright Young Things.

== Life ==
Gardner was born on 27 September 1903 in London. She was the youngest of four daughters born to Herbert Gardner, 1st Baron Burghclere, and Lady Winifred Herbert.

In the 1920s she came to be regarded as one of the Bright Young Things, a nickname given by the tabloid press to a group of bohemian young aristocrats and socialites. During this time she lived alone with Pansy Pakenham. It was such an unusual arrangement that the pair were interviewed by Alec Waugh in the spring of 1927 for an article on modern girls. The two girls invited Alec to a party given in Portland Place by the Ranee of Sarawak, and he brought along his brother Evelyn Waugh. Before meeting Waugh, Gardner had been engaged at least nine times, including to a soldier, a ship's purser, and a middle-aged divorcé. Harold Acton said she was "a fauness, with a little snub nose". Her closest friend, Nancy Mitford, said she was "a ravishing boy, a page".

On 27 June 1928, at St Paul's in Portman Square, Evelyn Gardner married Evelyn Waugh, against the wishes of her mother, who felt that Waugh lacked moral fibre and kept unsuitable company. Harold Acton was the best man, Robert Byron, the writer and art critic, gave away the bride, and Alec Waugh and Pansy Pakenham were the witnesses. The ceremony was performed by the Rev. William Henry Aldis, a former missionary to Szechwan. Among their friends, the couple quickly became known as "He-Evelyn" and "She-Evelyn". After only one year of marriage, Gardner left Waugh for their mutual friend John Heygate, whom she married in 1930. The marriage ended in divorce in 1936. In 1937 she married Ronald Nightingale, a civil servant and later an estate agent. They had one son, Benedict Nightingale, a drama critic, and one daughter, Virginia Nightingale, a landscape architect.

After Gardner and Waugh's divorce, of all their friends, only Anthony Powell remained in contact with Gardner, despite the fact that most of them had been her friends before they had been his. It has been suggested that the adultress Brenda Last in A Handful of Dust (1934) is based upon Gardner.

Gardner died on 11 March 1994 in Ticehurst, East Sussex, and was buried in the graveyard of St Mary's Church, Ticehurst.
