= Daniel Coyle =

Irish show jumping rider

Personal information
- Born: 2 December 1994 (age 31) Ardmore, County Londonderry, Northern Ireland

Sport
- Country: Ireland
- Sport: Equestrian
- Event: Show jumping

Daniel Coyle (born 2 December 1994) is an equestrian from Northern Ireland, who competes in show jumping.

== Career ==
In March 2022, Coyle won the $500,000 Great American Grand Prix on Ariel Grange’s Legacy in Florida.

In June 2022, riding Oak Grove’s Carlyle, Coyle became the first Irish rider to win the five-star CHIO Rotterdam in 58 years.

In the space of two months riding Legacy and Incredible in 2023 he won a hat-trick of consecutive five-star World Cups in Leipzig, Amsterdam, and Ocala, Florida. He also won the Grand Prix in Ocala on Farel. On Legacy he produced a double clear that helped Ireland qualify for the FEI League Of Nations final in Barcelona in October 2023.

Riding Legacy he claimed victory in the $150,000 Mad Barn Big Ben International Challenge on 9 November, at the Royal Horse Show in Toronto.

In December 2023, riding Legacy he won the grand prix at the London International Horse Show. He also made the jump-off, briefly leading, at the Logines World Cup, at the event.

He was selected for the 2024 Paris Olympics riding Legacy. He placed 3rd in qualifying, but was retired in the main Olympic competition. on Legacy, he was also leading the European Show Jumping Championships in Spain in 2025, but had to withdraw.

== Personal life ==
Coyle is from Ardmore, County Londonderry, Northern Ireland.
