= Donald's Hill =

Mountain in Northern Ireland

Coordinates: 55.00190°N 6.81623°W

- Knocknahurkle

Highest point
- Elevation: 399 m (1,309 ft)
- Listing: Marilyn

Geography
- Location: Drumsurn, County Londonderry, Northern Ireland
- OSI/OSNI grid: C758178

Donald's Hill (Irish: Cnoc Dhónaill), or Knocknahurkle (Cnoc na hEarcola), is a hill in County Londonderry, Northern Ireland. The summit is 399 metres (1,309 ft) above sea level and classifies it as a Marilyn. It is part of the Keenaght Hills and overlooks the village of Drumsurn.

Donald's Hill lies on the route of the North Sperrins Way section of the Ulster Way long-distance walking circuit.

== Links ==
- The University of Dublin, Trinity College, Department of Geology
