= Umbra railway station =

Railway station in County Londonderry, Northern Ireland

Umbra
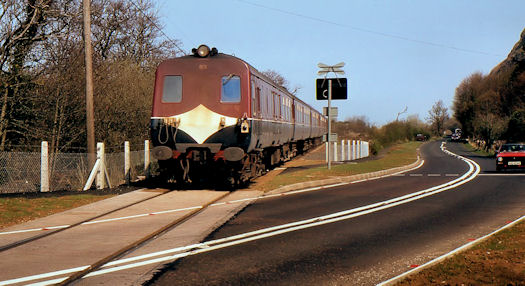
- NIR Class 80 train passing the site of Umbra station in 1984

General information
- Location: Benone, County Londonderry; Northern Ireland
- Coordinates: 55.162065°N 6.862948°W
- Platforms: 1

Other information
- Status: Disused

History
- Original company: Londonderry and Coleraine Railway
- Post-grouping: Belfast and Northern Counties Railway

Key dates
- 1855: Station opens
- 1861: Station closes
Location

Umbra railway station served the Umbra nature reserve near Downhill in County Londonderry, Northern Ireland.

The Londonderry and Coleraine Railway opened the station in 1855.

It served only as a request stop for its short lifetime, and closed in 1861.

== Routes ==
Preceding station	Historical railways	Following station
Downhill; Line open, station closed	Londonderry and Coleraine Railway; Coleraine-Derry	Magilligan; Line open, station closed
