= Drummond railway station =

Railway station in County Londonderry, Northern Ireland

Drummond

General information
- Location: Drummond, County Londonderry; Northern Ireland

Other information
- Status: Disused

History
- Original company: Londonderry and Coleraine Railway
- Post-grouping: Belfast and Northern Counties Railway

Key dates
- 1 July 1855: Station opens
- 1 October 1855: Station closes

Drummond station served Drummond in County Londonderry in Northern Ireland.

The Londonderry and Coleraine Railway opened the station on 1 July 1855, on a short horse-drawn tram from Magilligan station.

It closed on 1 October 1855.

== Routes ==
Preceding station	Historical railways	Following station
Magilligan	Londonderry and Coleraine Railway; Magilligan Point Tramway	Magilligan Point
