= Magilligan =

Peninsula in County Londonderry, Northern Ireland

Coordinates: 55.187°N 6.958°W

Magilligan: Irish: Ard Mhic Giollagáin
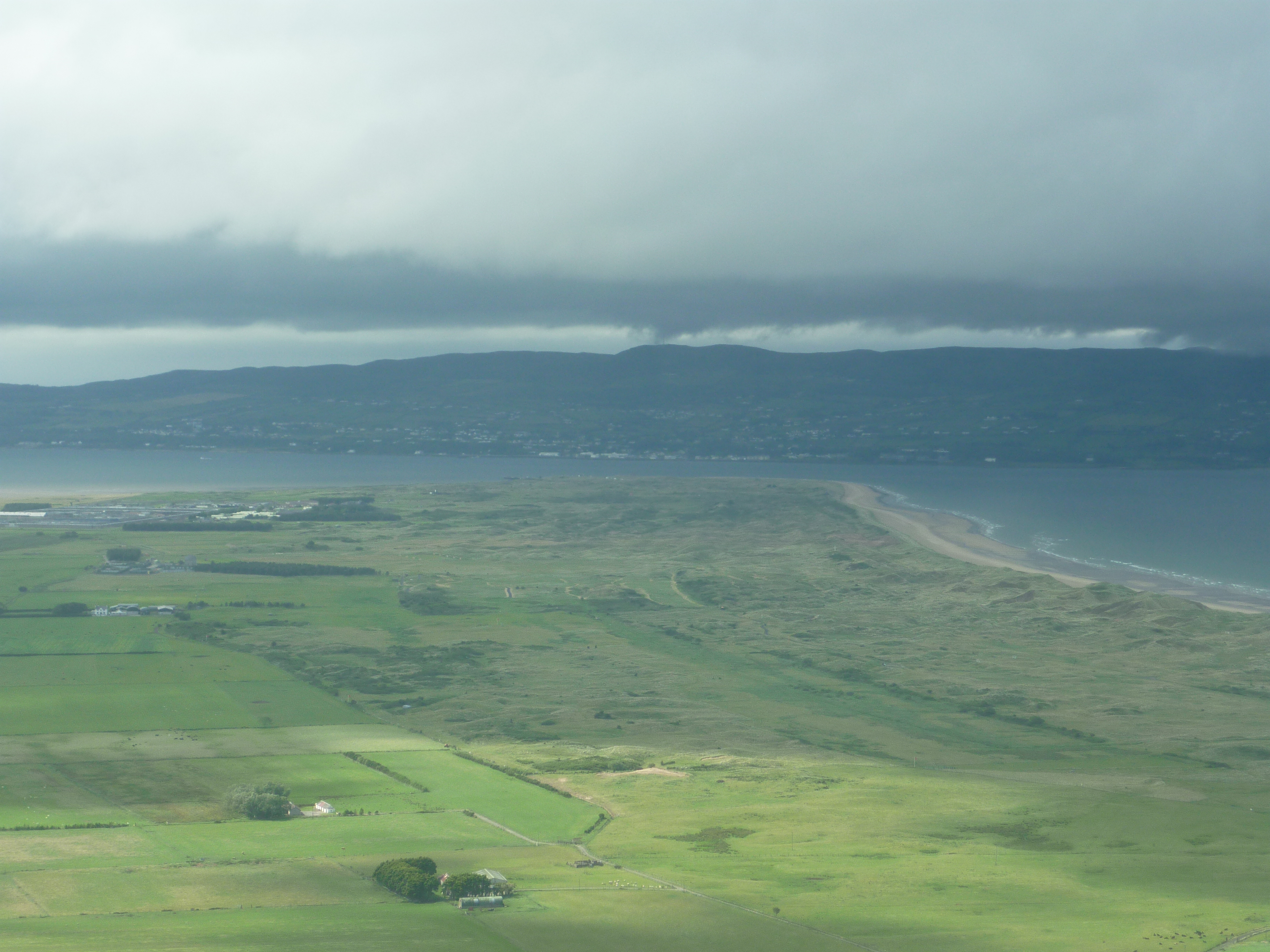
- View of Magilligan Point and Inishowen beyond

- Location within Northern Ireland
- Population: 578 (2001 Census)
- Irish grid reference: H8396
- Civil parish: Magilligan
- District: Causeway Coast and Glens
- County: County Londonderry
- Country: Northern Ireland
- Sovereign state: United Kingdom
- Postcode district: BT49
- Dialling code: 028
- Police: Northern Ireland
- Fire: Northern Ireland
- Ambulance: Northern Ireland
- UK Parliament: East Londonderry
- NI Assembly: East Londonderry

Magilligan is a peninsula at the mouth of Lough Foyle in County Londonderry, Northern Ireland. It is an extensive 79,000-acre (32,000-hectare) coastal site, part military firing range and part nature reserve, and is home to HM Prison Magilligan. The tip of the peninsula, which lies less than a mile from Greencastle in County Donegal, is known as Magilligan Point. The two are linked by a ferry service.

== History ==
The peninsula historically belonged to a district known as "MacGilligan's Country", which formed a major part of the barony of Keenaght.

Magilligan served as the base line for triangulation for the mapping of Ireland in the 19th century. Colonel Thomas Colby chose Magilligan due to the flatness of the strand and its proximity to Scotland which, along with the rest of Britain, had been accurately mapped in previous decades. A straight line precisely 30,533 feet (9,306 m) was measured from North Station to Ballykelly in 1828, from which all other references were measured. The survey finished in 1846 when County Kerry was mapped.

== Landmarks ==
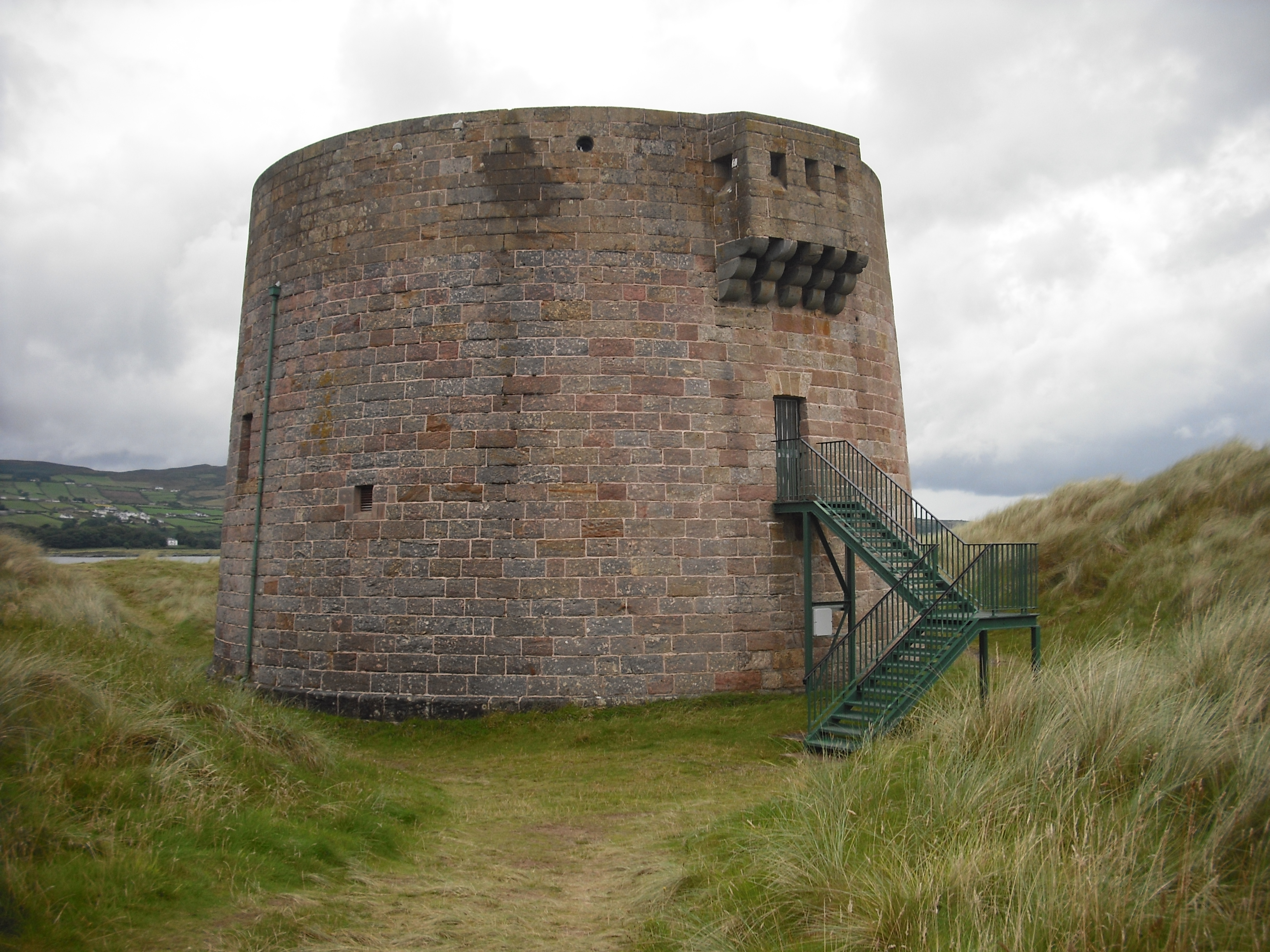
Magilligan Martello Tower

There is a well-preserved Martello Tower at Magilligan Point, built between 1815 and 1817. It is one of the northernmost of the 74 towers built along the coasts of Ireland during the Napoleonic Wars.

HM Prison Magilligan is situated along the main road (Point Road) running out to Magilligan Point. It opened in 1972 and has a capacity of 568 prisoners.

There is a statue of Manannán mac Lir at the Binevenagh Viewpoint facing the sea, installed in 2013. It was made by John Sutton. The statue was stolen in 2016 in an alleged act of religious extremism as a cross with the words 'You shall have no other gods before me' was put in its place. It however, was found a year later, destroyed 300 meters from where it stood. It was replaced by the now-defunct Limavady Borough Council for a price of £10,000.

== Transport ==
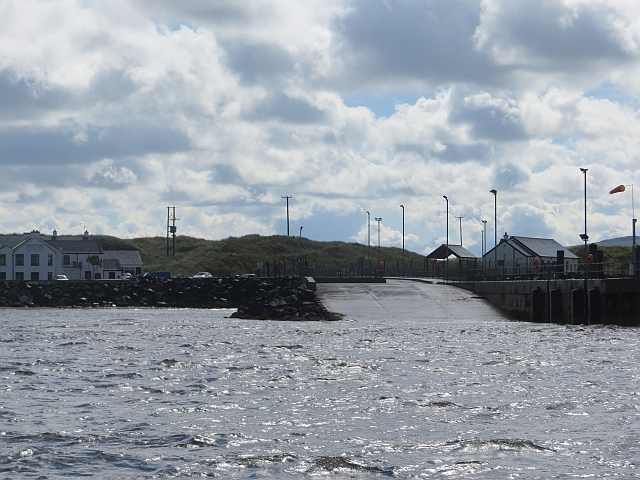
Ferry slip, Magilligan Point

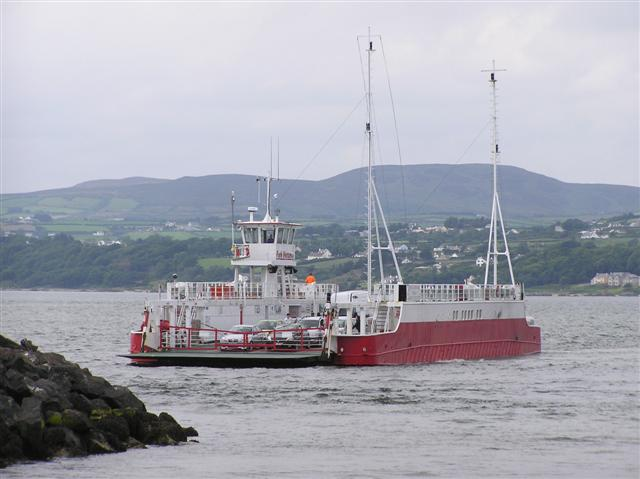
The ferry to Greencastle

It is close to Bellarena railway station and there is a ferry service which operates during the summer season, connecting Magilligan with Greencastle across the lough.

During the 19th century the Londonderry & Coleraine Railway operated a short-lived tramway between the village of Magilligan and the settlement of Magilligan Point. Opening in July 1885 and closing in October 1885, it is the shortest-lived passenger railway line in Ireland.

== Notable people ==
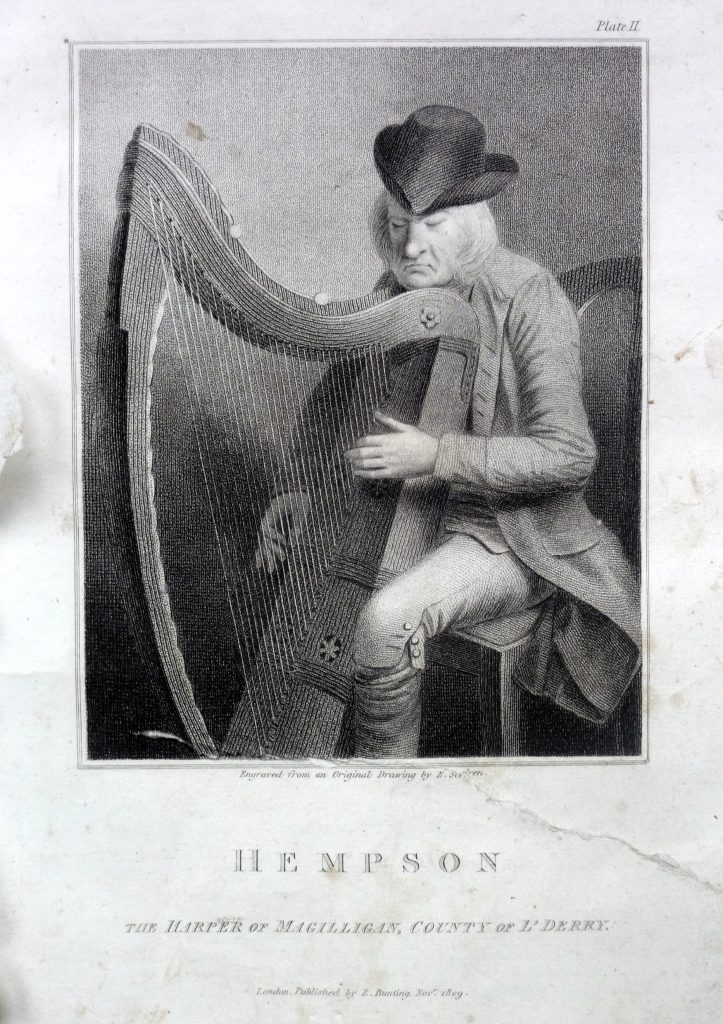
Illustration from 1809 of Hempson (Donnchadh Ó hAmhsaigh) the Harper of Magilligan after a drawing from Edward Bunting's The Ancient Music of Ireland

- Donnchadh Ó hAmhsaigh (1695–1807) – Irish harpist
- John Graham – Church of Ireland clergyman, a senior officer of the Orange Order, and a prolific author of poetic and historical works
- Eddie Butcher (1900–1980) – singer, songwriter and song collector
