= Ardmore railway station =

Railway station in Northern Ireland

Ardmore

General information
- Location: Ardmore, County Londonderry; Northern Ireland
- Coordinates: 55.0278°N 6.9014°W

History
- Opened: 4 July 1883
- Closed: 1 January 1933
- Original company: Londonderry and Coleraine Railway
- Post-grouping: Belfast and Northern Counties Railway

Services
Preceding station	Disused railways	Following station
Limavady	Londonderry and Coleraine Railway; Limavady Junction to Dungiven	Drumsurn
Location

Ardmore railway station served Ardmore in County Londonderry in Northern Ireland.

The Londonderry and Coleraine Railway opened the station on 4 July 1883.

It closed on 1 January 1933.
