= Faughanvale railway station =

Railway station in County Londonderry, Northern Ireland

Faughanvale

General information
- Location: Faughanvale, County Londonderry; Northern Ireland
- Coordinates: 55.0442°N 7.0915°W

Other information
- Status: Disused

History
- Original company: Londonderry and Coleraine Railway
- Post-grouping: Belfast and Northern Counties Railway

Key dates
- 1 May 1855: Station opens
- 1 April 1859: Station closes
Location

Faughanvale railway station served the village of Faughanvale in County Londonderry, Northern Ireland.

The Londonderry and Coleraine Railway opened the station on 1 May 1855.

It closed on 1 April 1859.

== Routes ==
Preceding station	Historical railways	Following station
Carrichue; Line open, station closed	Londonderry and Coleraine Railway; Coleraine-Derry	Eglinton; Line open, station closed
