= Sir William Heygate, 1st Baronet =

British politician

Sir William Heygate, 1st Baronet (24 June 1782 – 28 August 1844) was a British politician who served as Lord Mayor of London from 1822 to 1823. He was the first Heygate Baronet of Southend.

== Life ==
He was a Member of Parliament for Sudbury from 1818 to 1826.

He also led the public campaign to create Southend Pier. He died in the office of Chamberlain of the City of London, a position he had held since only the previous year.

He had a son, William Unwin Heygate, born 1825.

== Honours ==
He was awarded his baronetcy on 15 September 1831 on the occasion of King William IV's Coronation Honours.

A train on the Southend Pier Railway is named after him.

Civic offices
Preceded by Christopher Magnay	Lord Mayor of London; 1821 – 1822	Succeeded by Robert Waithman
Baronetage of the United Kingdom
New creation	Baronet (of Southend); 1831–1844	Succeeded by Frederick Heygate
