= Frederick Heygate =

Irish politician

Sir Frederick William Heygate, 2nd Baronet (1822–1894), of the Heygate Baronets, was an Irish Conservative Party politician. He served as a Member of Parliament (MP) for Londonderry from 1865 to 1874.

Baronetage of the United Kingdom
Preceded by William Heygate	Baronet (of Southend); 1844–1894	Succeeded by Frederick Heygate
