= Articlave =

Village in County Londonderry, Northern Ireland

Articlave: Irish: Ard an Chléibh
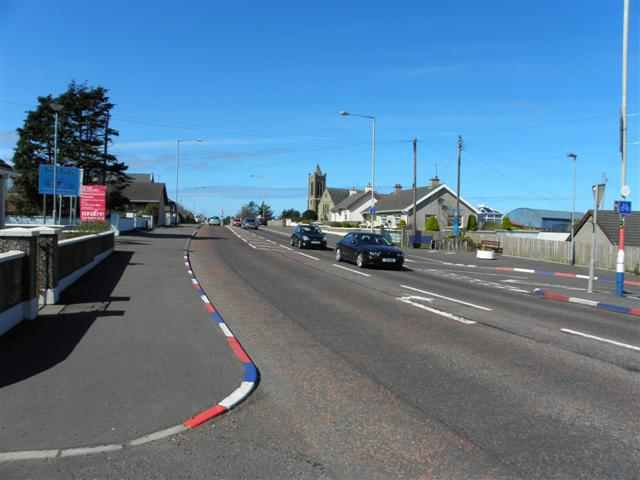
- St Pauls Road

- Location within Northern Ireland
- Population: 922 (2011 Census)
  - Belfast: 50 mi (80 km)
- District: Causeway Coast and Glens
- County: County Londonderry
- Country: Northern Ireland
- Sovereign state: United Kingdom
- Post town: COLERAINE
- Postcode district: BT51
- Dialling code: 028
- Police: Northern Ireland
- Fire: Northern Ireland
- Ambulance: Northern Ireland
- UK Parliament: East Londonderry
- NI Assembly: East Londonderry

Articlave (from Irish Ard an Chléibh, meaning 'height of the basket') is a village and townland in County Londonderry, Northern Ireland. It is on the main A2 coastal road, 7 kilometres west of Coleraine. Castlerock railway station is 1 mile (1.6 km) to the north. In the past, the area has been spelt as Ardacleve or Ardacleave. It is situated within the Causeway Coast and Glens district.

== Demographics ==
=== 2011 Census ===
On Census day in 2011, the population of Articlave was 922. Of these:

- 24.3% were aged under 16 years and 15.3% were aged 65 and over
- 48.8% were male and 51.2% were female
- 12.5% were from a Catholic background and 82.5% were from a Protestant background

=== 2001 Census ===
Articlave is classified as a Small Village or Hamlet by the NI Statistics and Research Agency (NISRA) (i.e. with population between 500 and 1,000 people). On Census day (29 April 2001) there were 800 people living in Articlave. Of these:

- 26.0% were aged under 16 years and 14.9% were aged 60 and over
- 49.5% of the population were male and 50.5% were female
- 18.1% were from a Catholic background and 79.2% were from a Protestant background
- 6.5% of people aged 16–74 were unemployed.
