= Castlerock railway station =

Station in County Londonderry, Northern Ireland

Castlerock
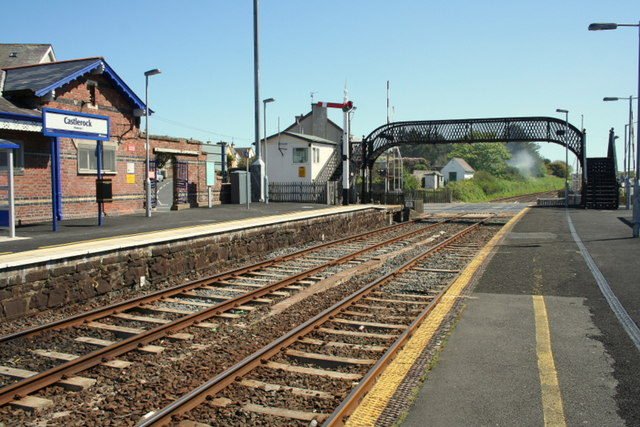
- Castlerock station in 2009, prior to the line being singled

General information
- Location: Sea Road; Castlerock; BT51 4TL; Causeway Coast and Glens; Northern Ireland
- Coordinates: 55°9′55″N 6°47′13″W
- Owner: NI Railways
- Operator: NI Railways
- Line: Derry ~ Londonderry Line
- Platforms: 1
- Tracks: 1

Construction
- Structure type: At-grade
- Parking: No
- Cycle facilities: Yes (cycle shelter)
- Accessible: Yes (step-free ramped access)

Other information
- Status: Open
- Station code: CK
- Fare zone: iLink Zone 4 & North West
- Website: translink.co.uk/Castlerock

History
- Original company: Londonderry and Coleraine Railway
- Pre-grouping: Belfast and Northern Counties Railway

Key dates
- 18 July 1853: Opened
- 1970: New signal box opened
- 2008: Refurbished
- 2 November 2016: Passing loop removed and signal box closed

Passengers
- 2022/23: 107,026
- 2023/24: ▲139,352
- 2024/25: ▼138,598
- 2025/26: ▲145,323

Services
Preceding station	NI Railways	Following station
Bellarena towards Derry~Londonderry	Derry ~ Londonderry Line	Coleraine towards Belfast Grand Central

Historical railway lines
Preceding station	Londonderry and Coleraine Railway	Following station
Downhill; Line open, station closed	Londonderry and Coleraine Railway; Coleraine–Derry	Barmouth; Line open, station closed
- NI Railways; Translink; NI railway stations
Route map
(Click to expand)
Location
- Location within Northern Ireland Location within island of Ireland
- Location in Castlerock
Notes
- Passenger statistics are Translink railway station footfall counts rather than accredited passenger-journey statistics.

Castlerock railway station serves the villages of Castlerock, Articlave and their surrounding hamlets in County Londonderry, Northern Ireland. Walkers use the station to reach Mussenden Temple, Downhill Strand and Benone.

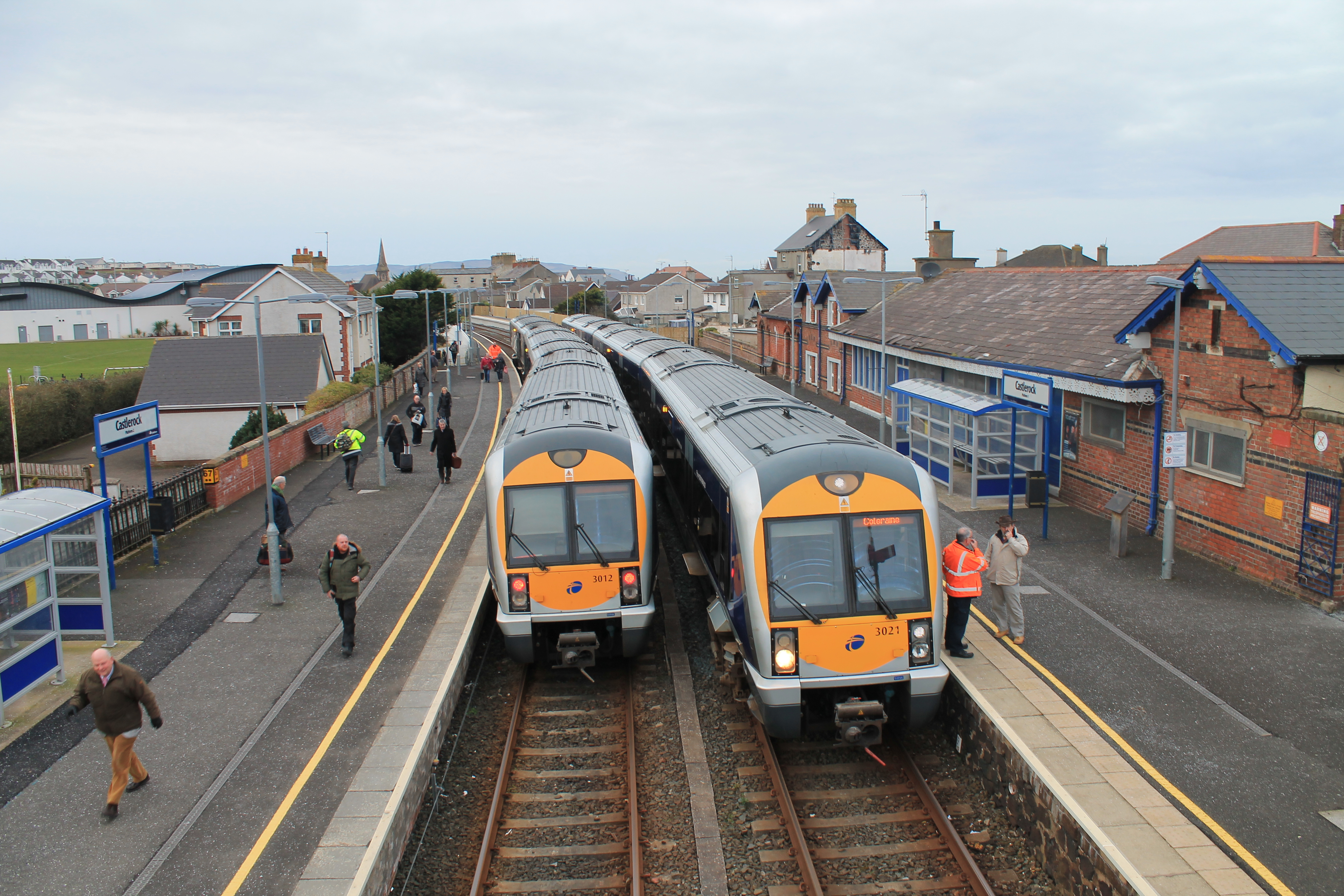
Trains crossing at Castlerock in 2016. The down platform on the left has now been taken out of service and no longer has a running track.

The station opened on 18 July 1853 and was built to a design by the architect Charles Lanyon. It comprised a single-storey red brick on the 'up' platform. There is a modern two storey addition to this in a similar style.

As part of works to upgrade the Coleraine-Derry railway line, the passing loop at Castlerock station was discontinued and replaced with a new loop at Bellarena. The station signal box which was the last full-time mechanical signal box on the NIR network and the last to use block tokens was subsequently closed on 2 November 2016. The down platform, despite receiving a complete refurbishment two years prior, has now been taken out of service and the track lifted. All services calling at Castlerock now use the former up platform.

== Service ==
Mondays to Saturdays there is an hourly service towards Derry~Londonderry or Belfast Grand Central operated by Northern Ireland Railways.

On Sundays there are 6 trains in each direction.
