= Dungiven railway station =

Railway station in Northern Ireland

Dungiven

General information
- Location: Dungiven, County Londonderry, Northern Ireland; UK
- Coordinates: 54.9296°N 6.9241°W

History
- Original company: Londonderry and Coleraine Railway
- Post-grouping: Belfast and Northern Counties Railway

Key dates
- 4 July 1883: Station opens
- 1 January 1933: Station closes to passengers
- 3 July 1950: Station closes
Location

Dungiven railway station served Dungiven in County Londonderry in Northern Ireland.

== History ==
The Londonderry and Coleraine Railway opened the station on 4 July 1883.

It closed to passenger traffic on 1 January 1933 and then closed completely on 3 July 1950.

== Routes ==
Preceding station	Disused railways	Following station
Derryork	Londonderry and Coleraine Railway; Limavady Junction to Dungiven	Terminus
