= Limavady Junction railway station =

Railway station in County Londonderry, Northern Ireland

Limavady Junction
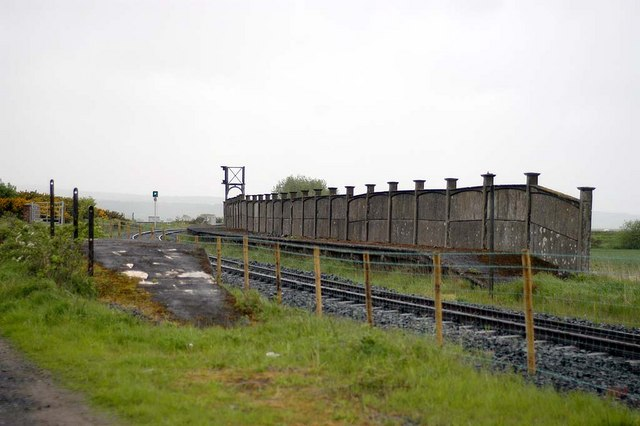
- Remains of the station in 2006

General information
- Location: County Londonderry; Northern Ireland
- Coordinates: 55.0734°N 7.0023°W
- Platforms: 2

Other information
- Status: Demolished

History
- Original company: Londonderry and Coleraine Railway
- Pre-grouping: Belfast and Northern Counties Railway
- Post-grouping: Northern Ireland Railways

Key dates
- 1 March 1855: Station opens as Newton Junction
- 1 October 1875: Station renamed Limavady Junction
- 17 October 1976: Station closes
Location

Limavady Junction railway station served the town of Limavady in County Londonderry in Northern Ireland.

The Londonderry and Coleraine Railway opened the station as Newton Junction on 1 March 1855. It was renamed Limavady Junction on 1 October 1875. At this time, new station buildings were provided to designs by the architect John Lanyon.

It closed on 17 October 1976. Since 2013, the remains of the station have been demolished.

== Routes ==
Preceding station	NI Railways	Following station
Bellarena	Northern Ireland Railways; Belfast-Derry	Derry~Londonderry
	Historical railways	
Bellarena; Line open, station closed	Londonderry and Coleraine Railway; Coleraine-Derry	Ballykelly; Line open, station closed
Terminus	Londonderry and Coleraine Railway; Limavady-Dungiven	Broighter; Line and station closed
