= Bellarena =

Village in County Londonderry, Northern Ireland

Coordinates: 55°07′40″N 06°57′09″W

- Location within Northern Ireland
  - Belfast: 55 mi (89 km)
- District: Causeway Coast and Glens
- County: County Londonderry
- Country: Northern Ireland
- Sovereign state: United Kingdom
- Post town: LIMAVADY
- Postcode district: BT49
- Dialling code: 028
- Police: Northern Ireland
- Fire: Northern Ireland
- Ambulance: Northern Ireland
- UK Parliament: East Londonderry
- NI Assembly: East Londonderry

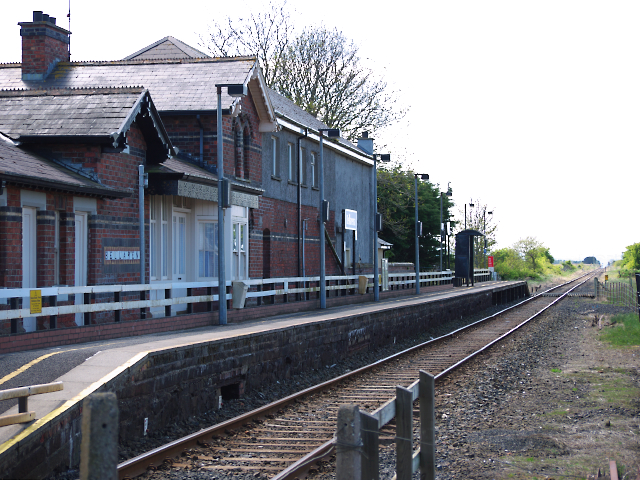
Bellarena railway station, May 2010

Bellarena (derived from French belle "beautiful" + Latin arena "sand, strand") is a small village and townland in County Londonderry, Northern Ireland. It is on the A2 coastal road between Limavady and Coleraine, 6 miles (9.7 km) north of Limavady. The land was settled in the mid-17th century by a Northamptonshire gentleman, William Gage, who bought the lease of the estate – then called Ballymargy from the Irish Baile an Mhargaidh, meaning "town of the market" – from the Lord Bishop of Derry. In the 2001 census the population was 291. The village lies within Causeway Coast and Glens District Council area and the Binevenagh Area of Outstanding Natural Beauty, with open views eastwards to the scarp slope of Binevenagh. The village gets its name from the Earl Bishop of Derry.

== Features ==
The village is a minor service centre providing retail, community and recreational facilities for the local rural population. There was a primary school, which was opened in 1861 by the landowner for his workers but closed in 2018, due to the dwindling number of pupils. The local police station in the 1960s is now used as a field centre. It has had considerable growth in recent years, with new private housing development and improved commercial facilities. The main concentration of development is the large Drumavalley and Oughtymoyle public housing estates and the recently completed private development of 18 semi-detached 3 and 4 bedroom houses at Carriage Court.

== Tourism ==
Bellarena has benefited from being close to a range of important tourism facilities including the recreational facilities, Blue Flag beach and caravan parks at Benone, the Magilligan to Greencastle (County Donegal) ferry and the nearby long-established Ulster Gliding Club at Bellarena Airfield.

== Transport ==
Bellarena is located close to the main railway line between Belfast and Derry and is served by Bellarena railway station, which was opened on 18 July 1853 by the Londonderry and Coleraine Railway (later part of the Northern Counties Committee). It was closed for goods traffic from 4 January 1965.

== Education ==
- Bellarena Primary School - now closed
- Magilligan Field Centre
