= Bellarena railway station =

Railway station in Northern Ireland

Bellarena
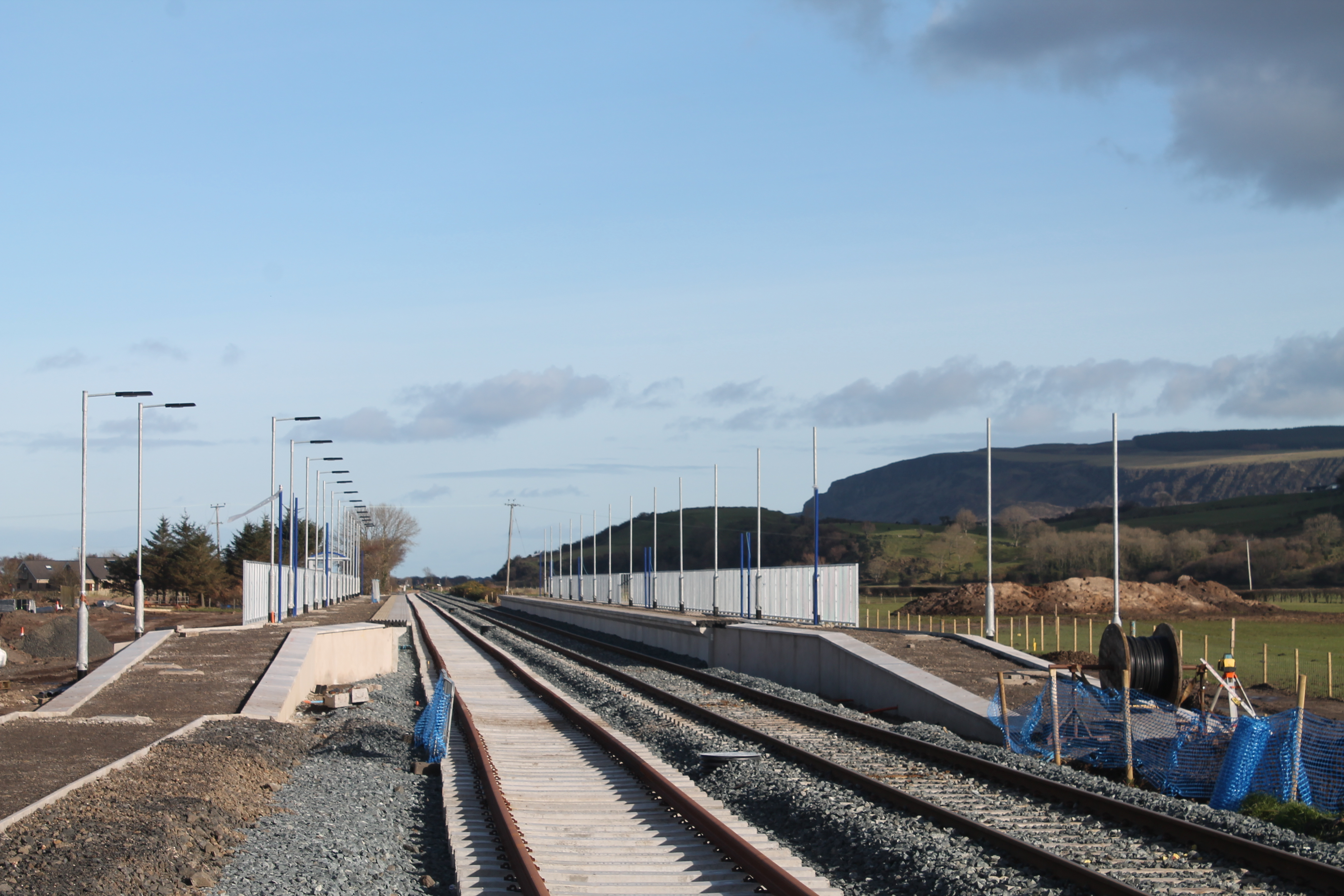
- The new station under construction in 2016

General information
- Location: Bellarena; Causeway Coast and Glens; Northern Ireland
- Coordinates: 55°7′36″N 6°57′6″W
- Owner: NI Railways
- Operator: NI Railways
- Line: Derry ~ Londonderry Line
- Platforms: 2
- Tracks: 2

Construction
- Structure type: At-grade

Other information
- Status: Open
- Station code: BN
- Fare zone: iLink Zone 4 & North West
- Website: translink.co.uk/Bellarena

Key dates
- 1853: Opened
- 1976: Closed
- 1982: Reopened
- 2016: Station relocated and passing loop constructed

Passengers
- 2022/23: 55,822
- 2023/24: ▲74,030
- 2024/25: ▲74,128
- 2025/26: ▲81,335

Services
| Preceding station | NI Railways | Following station |
|---|---|---|
| Derry~Londonderry Terminus | Derry ~ Londonderry Line | Castlerock towards Belfast Grand Central |

Historical railway lines
| Preceding station | Londonderry and Coleraine Railway | Following station |
|---|---|---|
| Limavady Junction; Line open, station closed | Londonderry and Coleraine Railway; Coleraine–Derry | Magilligan; Line open, station closed |
- NI Railways; Translink; NI railway stations
Route map
(Click to expand)
Location
- Location within Northern Ireland Location within island of Ireland
- Location in Bellarena
Notes
- Passenger statistics are Translink railway station footfall counts rather than accredited passenger-journey statistics.

Bellarena railway station serves the village of Bellarena and the broader Limavady area in County Londonderry, Northern Ireland. The current two-platform station was opened in 2016, replacing the original single-platform 1853 station located on the opposite side of the nearby level crossing. The station is the local railhead for nearby HMP Magilligan.

== Original station (1853-2016) ==
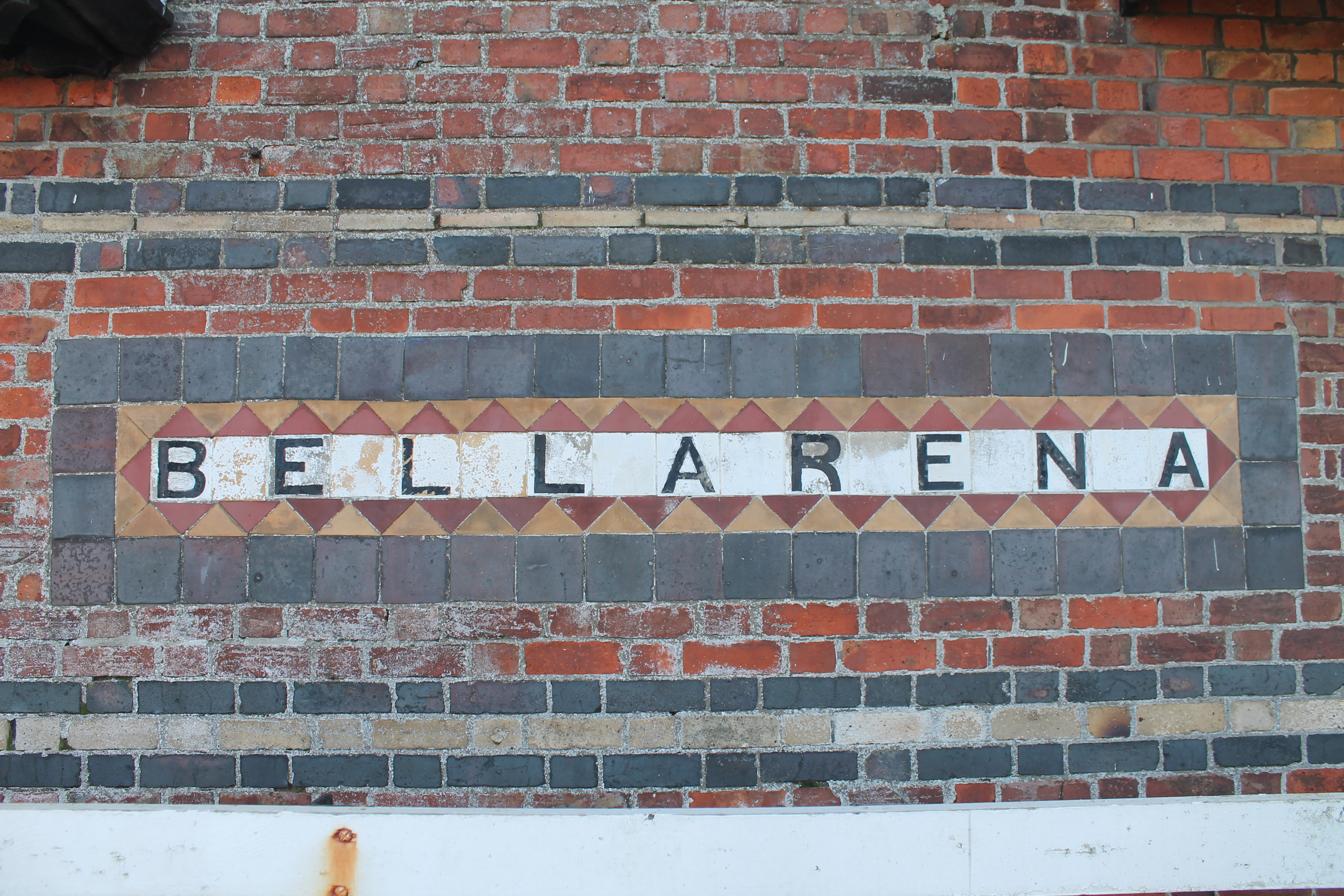
One feature Bellarena retains from BNCR days is the station name spelled out in tiles on the building

Bellarena station has served several railway companies since its first opening on 18 July 1853. The original station buildings were erected between 1873 and 1875 to designs by the architect John Lanyon.

It was closed for goods traffic from 4 January 1965, and to passengers from 18 October 1976, but was later re-opened on 28 June 1982.

The original station buildings are now in private ownership and were converted to living quarters in 2005, with the exterior boasting the station's name in a unique tile pattern. The stationmaster's house was renovated in the 1980s.

== Current station (2016-present) ==
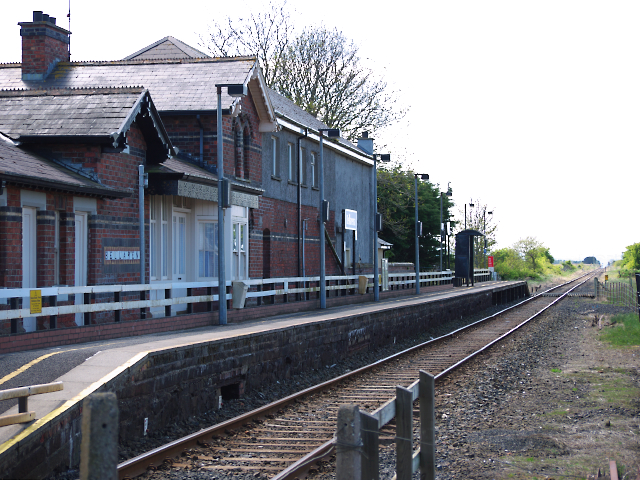
The original station, opened in 1853 and closed in 2016. The new station is located behind the camera.

In late 2015, work started on a new station at Bellarena, replacing the original 1853 station with one on a new site located on the other side of the adjacent level crossing. The new station opened to traffic on Monday 21 March 2016. Unlike the old station, the new station has two platforms, with a new passing loop replacing the one originally at Castlerock railway station. The original station features are still in existence and can easily be seen from the new station.

== Service ==
Mondays to Saturdays there is an hourly service towards Derry~Londonderry or Belfast Grand Central operated by Northern Ireland Railways.

On Sundays there are 6 trains in each direction.
