= HM Prison Magilligan =

Prison in Limavady, Northern Ireland

HMP Magilligan
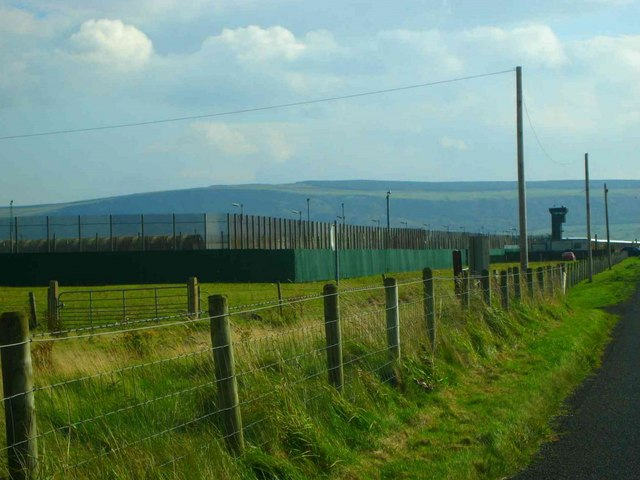
- Interactive map of HMP Magilligan
- Location: Limavady, Northern Ireland; 55.17605°N 6.94936°W
- Status: Operational
- Security class: Low-Medium Security
- Capacity: 568
- Opened: 1972
- Managed by: Northern Ireland Prison Service
- Governor: R Taylor

HM Prison Magilligan is a medium security prison run by the Northern Ireland Prison Service situated near Limavady, County Londonderry.

== History ==
It was first opened in January 1972 when 50 Irish Republican internees were transferred from the prison ship HMS Maidstone. The camp comprised eight Nissen huts on the site of an army camp. The prison was divided into compounds to house the various paramilitary internees and was manned by British Army dog handlers and prison staff on detached duty from Scotland, England and Wales as well as some staff from Northern Ireland.

The temporary accommodation was later replaced by three H-blocks similar to those at the Maze prison each containing 100 cells.

In 1976 the prison wall was built and the prison began to house other prisoners who had been convicted of non-terrorist offences as well some young prisoners including Borstal trainees.

In 1977 the trainees were transferred to Woburn House in Millisle and prisoners convicted of scheduled terrorist offences transferred to the Maze. This left Magilligan operating as a 'normal' prison in the context of Northern Ireland prisons. The regime was consequently developed to reflect this.

The prison currently has a Certified Normal Accommodation capacity of 568 prisoners. It is a medium to low security prison that held male prisoners who have six years or less to serve and who meet the relevant security classification.

In fact, in 2017 Magilligan Prison proved to be the best performing jail in Northern Ireland according to an unannounced inspection by the Criminal Justice Inspection Northern Ireland (CJI) and her Majesty's Inspectorate of Prisons in England & Wales (HMIP).
