= Derry/Londonderry name dispute =

Political dispute in Northern Ireland

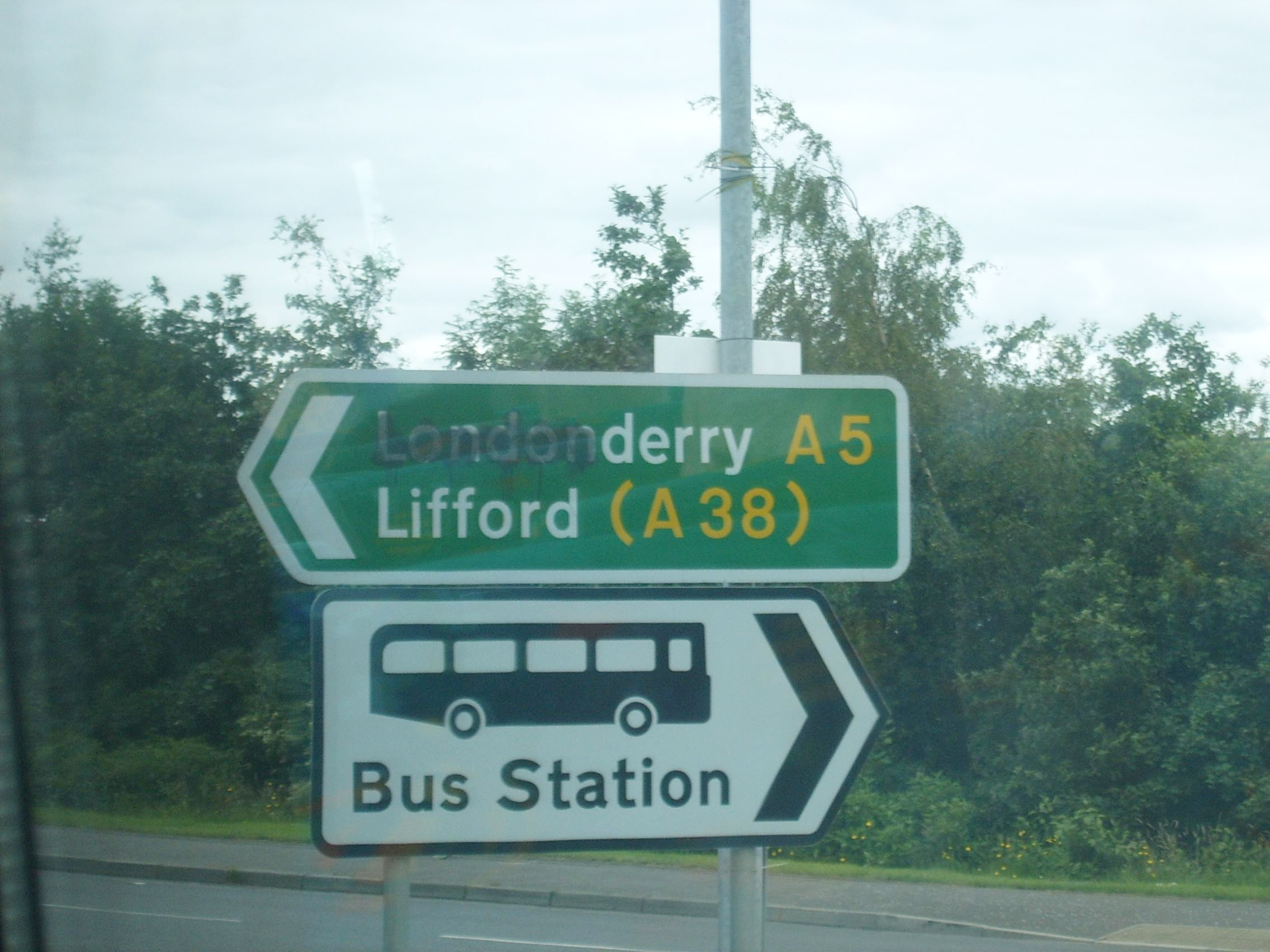
A defaced road sign at nearby Strabane, County Tyrone, in which the "London" in "Londonderry" has been daubed over with black paint

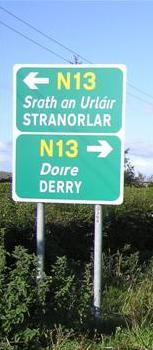
A sign near the N13 in County Donegal, Republic of Ireland, reads Derry in English (and Doire in Irish)

The names of the city and county of Derry or Londonderry in Northern Ireland are the subject of a naming dispute between Irish nationalists and unionists. Generally, although not always, nationalists favour using the name Derry, and unionists Londonderry. Legally, the city and county are called "Londonderry", while the local government district containing the city is called "Derry City and Strabane". The naming debate became particularly politicised at the outset of the Troubles, with the mention of either name acting as a shibboleth used to associate the speaker with one of Northern Ireland's two main communities. The district of Derry and Strabane was created in 2015, subsuming a district created in 1973 with the name "Londonderry", which changed to "Derry" in 1984.

== History ==
=== Origins of the name ===
The earliest Irish name for the site of the modern city was Daire Calgaich, Old Irish for "oak wood of Calgach", after an unknown pagan. John Keys O'Doherty, the Catholic Bishop of Derry from 1889 to 1907, sought to identify Calgach with Agricola's opponent Calgacus, whereas Patrick Weston Joyce says Calgach, meaning "fierce warrior", was a common given name. A Celtic Christian monastery was founded at Daire Calgaich in the sixth century; Adomnán names Saint Columba as founder. The name was changed to Daire Coluimb Chille, "oak wood of Columba", first mentioned in the Annals of Ulster for 1121. As the monastic site grew in prominence, the name was reduced to just Doire (now pronounced [ˈd̪ˠɛɾʲə]). This was later anglicised to Derry. In 1604, "Derrie" was granted its first royal charter as a city and county corporate by James I of England. The settlement was destroyed in 1608 by Cahir O'Doherty, Irish chieftain of Inishowen.

=== The London connection ===
During the Plantation of Ulster by English and Scottish settlers, a new walled city was built across the River Foyle from the old site by the Irish Society, a consortium of the livery companies of the City of London. In recognition of the London investors, the 1613 charter stated "that the said city or town of Derry, for ever hereafter be and shall be named and called the city of Londonderry". The county was created by the same charter, largely based on the previous county of Coleraine, and named "Londonderry" after the new county town. A new city charter in 1662 confirmed the name "Londonderry" for the city. The Municipal Corporations (Ireland) Act 1840 reformed the municipal corporation and renamed it from "The Mayor and Commonalty and Citizens of the City of Londonderry" to "The Mayor, Commonalty, and Citizens of Londonderry". Under the Local Government (Ireland) Act 1898, the city of Londonderry became the county borough of Londonderry, and the rest of the "judicial county" of Londonderry became the "administrative county" of Londonderry.

=== Pronunciation of Londonderry ===
Historically, Londonderry was pronounced in Ireland as /ˌlʌndənˈdɛri/, with primary stress on the third syllable and secondary stress on the first syllable. In England, it was pronounced /ˈlʌndəndəri/, with primary stress on the first syllable and the third syllable reduced or elided. This latter is still used for the Marquess of Londonderry's title; otherwise, the usual pronunciation now is /ˈlʌndəndɛri/ with primary stress on the first syllable and secondary stress on the third syllable. In 1972, Lord Shackleton commented, "I very much hope that Ministers will stop talking about 'Londond'ry'. If they do not call it 'Derry' they might at least call it 'Londonderry'."

=== Historical usage ===
Before the outbreak of the Troubles in the late 1960s, the name was less contentious. While "Londonderry" was the official and formal name, most people in Northern Ireland called it "Derry" in informal speech. The name became a shibboleth when sectarian tensions increased. Samuel Lewis' 1837 Topographical Dictionary of Ireland said "It was originally and is still popularly called Derry ... the English prefix London was imposed in 1613 ... and was for a long time retained by the colonists, but has ... fallen into popular disuse". The 1837 Ordnance Survey Memoir of the area concurs, and remarks "this mode of abbreviation is usual in Ireland, whenever the name of a place is compounded of two distinct and easily separable words; thus ... Carrickfergus is shortened into Carrick, Downpatrick into Down, ... etc." Occasionally, acts of the Irish (pre-1801) or UK (post-1801) parliaments referred to the city or county as "Derry".

Administrative subdivisions of various types were named after the city, including the barony of North West Liberties of Londonderry, townland and poor law union [PLU; later superintendent registrar's district] of Londonderry, county districts of Londonderry Nos. 1 and 2, (Note: "Londonderry No. 2 Rural District" in County Donegal was abolished by the Local Government Board for Ireland (LGBI) in 1921, and its area transferred from Londonderry PLU to Letterkenny PLU and Letterkenny Rural District. Londonderry No. 2 RDC unsuccessfully asked the LGBI to retain it, renamed "Burt Rural District" consequent on no longer being linked to Londonderry county or city. "Londonderry No.1 Rural District" in County Londonderry was renamed "Londonderry Rural District" in 1924 and became an urban district in 1969.) dispensary [later registrar's] districts of Londonderry Urban Nos. 1 and 2, and poor law [later district] electoral divisions of Londonderry Nos. 1 to 5 Urban. All these were obsolete by 1972. In the Redistribution of Seats Act 1885, the two-seat Westminster county constituency of Londonderry was split into two single-seat county divisions. The use of "Derry" rather than "Londonderry" in their names was proposed by Frank Hugh O'Donnell, who said he thought that "at the time when the London Companies were despairing of retaining their hold upon Derry this Amendment would be accepted by the House. The Amendment would be welcomed in the North of Ireland, where the county in question was always spoken of as Derry, and not as Londonderry." This amendment was defeated, on the basis that a county constituency name ought to match the official county name; but T. M. Healy then proposed keeping the county name but changing the division names, thus: Londonderry (North Derry division) and Londonderry (South Derry division). Only David Plunket opposed this, noting "the City of Londonderry was spoken of both as Derry and Londonderry. The name of Derry was given when it was spoken of as a separate division of the county." The Stormont constituencies of North, South, Mid and City of Londonderry were so named by statute in 1929, although a 1935 Ordnance Survey of Northern Ireland map uses "Derry" instead of "Londonderry" for these. In the Stormont debate on the Electoral Law Act 1962, the Nationalist Party proposed to rename the "City of Londonderry" constituency to "City of Derry"; Brian Faulkner called the proposal "frivolous" and the claim that any unionists would support it "absolute nonsense".

The Northern Ireland Labour Party (NILP) was agnostic on the partition issue and sought votes from Catholic and Protestant workers; its affiliate in the city was officially named the "Londonderry Labour Party". In 1938, Paddy Fox left to form the more nationalist "Independent Derry Labour Party" (from 1945 the "Derry Labour Party"). In 1946 the NILP's constituency branches for City of Londonderry and Foyle formed a steering group called the "Derry Central Labour Party".

In 1952, the Irish and Northern Ireland governments agreed to establish the Foyle Fisheries Commission via parallel acts of their respective legislatures with largely identical texts; one difference was a reference to "the county of Londonderry" in the Stormont act as opposed to "the county of Derry" in the Oireachtas act. The "Foyle Area" under jurisdiction of the commission combined the "Londonderry District" in Northern Ireland with the "Moville District" formed in 1926 from the part of the original Londonderry District which was now in the Irish Free State.

In 1958, when the newly launched HMS Londonderry made a courtesy visit to its namesake port, nationalist councillor James Doherty protested that it was "a foreign warship which had been called after a version of the name of the city".

In 1963 the BBC commissioned from Terry McDonald A City Solitary, a documentary about the city scripted by John Hume and narrated by Brian Hannon. It ends by suggesting that Protestant [unionist] and Catholic [nationalist] citizens can together "build the bridge for Derry's future. A first symbol of that bridge could be the future full acceptance of the term Londonderry, for in it is summed up the two great traditions of the city: London, the fort of the ships, (Note: "Fort of the ships" is a proposed etymology of the name London from Brittonic.) the siege tradition; Derry, the oak grove of the native Irish." This implicit acceptance by Hume of Londonderry was recalled in later decades when he was a leading nationalist politician.

In 1965, Eddie McAteer of the University for Derry Committee expressed the hope that the rare common cause between local unionists and nationalists would force the Stormont government to reverse its decision not to base the New University of Ulster there: "The Government might be able to slap down the men of Derry. They might even be able to slap down the men of Londonderry. But they cannot slap down the united men of Derry and Londonderry".

In 1984, Peter Robinson of the Democratic Unionist Party (DUP) commented in the UK House of Commons:

Until the 1960s there was a happy use of both Londonderry and Derry. I am a member of an organisation known as the Apprentice Boys of Derry, and it is proud to have that name. The Protestants, Unionists and Loyalists who come from that area are happy to call themselves Derrymen. It was a matter that did not provoke excitement and it certainly was not taken as being an offensive remark to say that one was from Derry. Then, in the 1960s, as part of a deliberate campaign by Republicans to loosen the London connection, they emphasised that they had dropped the name London from the name of the city. As a result, the Unionist community emphasised the London part of the name.

=== District council ===
The Local Government (Boundaries) Act (Northern Ireland) 1971 and the Local Government Act (Northern Ireland) 1972 abolished the councils of the counties and county boroughs, and the lower-level county [urban and rural] districts. These were replaced by 26 new districts based around towns and cities. The geographical areas of the county and city no longer correspond to local government areas, but retain a legal existence as lieutenancy areas for ceremonial purposes. (Note: For example, there are Lords Lieutenant both "of County Londonderry" and "of the County Borough of Londonderry"; while notices in the London Gazette for the Queen's Award for Voluntary Service are, since 2013, broken down by lieutenancy areas, including "County Londonderry" and "the City of Londonderry".) One of the 26 new districts comprised the areas previously in the county borough of Londonderry and the adjacent county district of the same name. This new district was initially also named Londonderry, and, being based on a city, its council was named "Londonderry City Council". Nationalists accounted for the majority of the population, and nationalist political parties were elected to a majority of the council seats. (Note: Elections to the city's pre-1969 corporation produced unionist majorities, except in 1920, due latterly to gerrymandering.) In 1974 Fergus McAteer of the Nationalist Party first raised the question of the name at the city council. In 1978, now in the Irish Independence Party (IIP), McAteer tabled a motion "that this council wishes that the official name of the city be restored to the original and more common name of Derry". It was passed with Social Democratic and Labour Party (SDLP) support, on the understanding that no immediate action would be taken. When McAteer raised the issue for a fourth time in 1983, the council passed a resolution to officially change the name of the district from "Londonderry" to "Derry", consequently changing the name of the council from "Londonderry City Council" to "Derry City Council". Andy Pollak said that the vote symbolised the SDLP's shift from co-operation with the Ulster Unionist Party (UUP) in the 1970s to confrontation after the 1981 republican hunger strike, and that the SDLP was worried about Sinn Féin taking seats in the 1985 local elections. Pursuant to its resolution, the council applied under section 51 of the 1972 act to the Northern Ireland Department of the Environment, which was under direct rule from the Northern Ireland Office in London, with Chris Patten as Parliamentary Under-Secretary of State in charge of the department. On 24 January 1984, Patten decided to accede to the name change, which was effected by a statutory order commencing on 7 May 1984.

Unionists criticised the decision. The UUP and DUP boycotted city council meetings until the 1989 local elections, their councillors merely signing the roll once every three months to avoid forfeiting their seats. The DUP considered advocating a separate council for the unionist Waterside area. The Northern Ireland Assembly, which nationalist parties boycotted, discussed the matter at its plenary sessions. Patten gave evidence to the Assembly's Environment Committee, where Gregory Campbell hurled an Irish tricolour at him from the gallery; the committee's report favoured retaining the name Londonderry, with dissent from the Alliance Party (APNI). Martin Smyth said, "We are told that the two communities have to live together. We had a classic illustration of a name that brought the two communities together – Londonderry. 'London' indicates the British tradition and 'Derry' the Irish tradition. But the Government decided to do away with 'London' in the name of the Council." William Ross said, "Derry has never been used as the name of the city or of the island of Londonderry except as a shortened version of a longer name. The name was Derry Columbkille for centuries. It was Londonderry for centuries. Before that it was Derry Calgach [...] Those who sought the change sought it for no good reason. Their aim was to open a door. [...] It is beyond me how the name Derry city council will be separated from the concept of Londonderry city in the public mind. Everyone in Northern Ireland knows that the Republican elements in Londonderry city will ignore the name as they have always done. They now have a lever to put up Derry city right across the board. [...] People in Northern Ireland see it as an anti-British move by the most extreme Republican movements in Londonderry and the rest of Northern Ireland."

=== Debate on renaming the city ===
At the time of the 1984 name change, members of the majority SDLP group on the city council declared that it was not seeking to change the name of the city as it had no intention of "petitioning an English queen to change the name of our Irish city". The party preferred to leave the renaming of the city "for another day". The IIP obtained legal advice that the change of the district's name also affected the city and no petition was necessary.

The same process used by Derry City Council in 1984 was used less contentiously in 1999, when Dungannon district became Dungannon and South Tyrone Borough, reflecting that it extended to parts of County Tyrone distant from Dungannon town.

==== Judicial review ====
In April 2006 Derry City Council applied to the High Court of Northern Ireland to obtain a ruling that the true name of the city was indeed Derry, or alternatively an order that the British Government must change the name. It applied to the Information Commissioner's Office to require the Northern Ireland Office to make public the legal advice it had received at the time of the 1984 name change. The case opened in Belfast High Court on 6 December 2006 before Mr Justice Weatherup. The council's case was that the 1662 charter naming the city "Londonderry" was subject to subsequent local government legislation, and that the renaming of the city council in 1984 amended the charter by altering the name.

A ruling was handed down in 2007 that the city officially remained Londonderry, according to the royal charter of 10 April 1662:

The local government district and the city and the county are three separate entities. Only the name of the local government district (and the consequential changes to the names of the borough and the council) were affected by the Order in 1984. ... Further I reject the applicant's argument that the Department is obliged to exercise powers under section 134(1) of the Local Government (Northern Ireland) Act 1972 to modify the 1662 Charter to change the name of the city from Londonderry to Derry or that the Department is otherwise obliged to effect that name change. To achieve the name change desired by the applicant it is necessary to alter the 1662 Charter by the further exercise of the Prerogative or by legislation.

— Mr Justice Weatherup, ruling on 25 January 2007

==== Equality impact assessment ====
During the High Court case, it was clarified that the correct procedure to rename the city was via a petition to the Privy Council. On 27 November 2007, the council passed a motion by Gerry MacLochlainn to make such a petition. It was argued that this would provide a single clear identity to reduce confusion and facilitate marketing the city for tourism and investment. Three alternative proposals were rejected: to make no change to the name; to change to "Derry/Londonderry"; or to change the name of the city to "Derry" but retain the name of "Londonderry" for the historic core within the city walls.

An equality impact assessment (EQIA) was instigated to advise how the resolution could best be implemented. An opinion poll of district residents was commissioned in 2009, which reported that 75% of Catholics and 77% of nationalists found the proposed change acceptable, compared to 6% of Protestants and 8% of unionists. It found 76% of Protestants and 79% of unionists preferred the name "Londonderry" while 94% of Catholics and nationalists preferred "Derry". Overall, 26% found the proposal "very acceptable", 27% "acceptable", 6% "unacceptable", and 8% "totally unacceptable", while 32% had "no strong views".

The EQIA held two consultative forums, and solicited comments from the public at large. It received 12,136, of which 3,108 were broadly in favour of the proposal, and 9,028 opposed. Over 7,500 submissions collected by opponents of the change were submitted on the deadline of 11 September 2009. Most submissions did not elaborate on reasons for support or opposition; 14 specific responses in favour and 513 against did so. Many responses came from outside the city council district area.

The Northern Ireland Community Relations Council's submission to the EQIA said "the refusal to resort to majority-minority mechanisms to resolve cultural disputes is critical if we are to find a way forward in Northern Ireland." It suggested "the city might petition to be known as the 'City of Derry known equally as Londonderry and Doire' and commit to the use of the terms Derry-Londonderry-Doire on all official signage and public imagery" It encouraged alternative suggestions.

The Equality Commission for Northern Ireland's submission stated, "In the light of the serious adverse impacts on people of different religion/political belief within the Council area, and possibly for the region as a whole, the Equality Commission strongly advise Derry City Council not to proceed with the policy as it is currently proposed since a range of possible options has not been adequately considered and a significant amount of good relations work remains to be done before any official name change is considered." Alternative courses it offered were joint use of "Derry" and "Londonderry"; petitioning the Privy Council for multiple official names; changing the spelling of the name to "LondonDerry"; and renaming the city to "DoireLondonDerry".

The Town Clerk submitted the EQIA report to the council in time for its meeting on 8 March 2010, at which Sinn Féin councillors brought a motion to proceed with the petition. This was voted down by SDLP and unionist councillors. The SDLP then tabled motions to establish a steering group on the issue and to convene the political party heads; both motions were also rejected. In the aftermath of the meeting, Gregory Campbell, the DUP MP for East Londonderry, said the issue was 'dead', citing the result of the EQIA as the basis of his opinion.

=== Derry and Strabane council ===
Plans to alter the number and area of districts in Northern Ireland began in 2005. In 2008, Environment Minister Arlene Foster proposed replacing the 26 district councils with 11 larger area councils, with the areas of Derry City Council and Strabane District Council to be merged. In 2009, Mark Orr, a Queen's Counsel and Assistant Commissioner proposing names and boundaries for the scheme, recommended the name "Derry City and Strabane Regional Council" for the merged body, even though unionist representatives had favoured a name which used "Londonderry" or avoided either word. Political deadlock delayed the reorganisation until 1 April 2015, when the new Derry and Strabane District Council took office. The district name was officially changed from "Derry and Strabane" to "Derry City and Strabane" on 24 February 2016.

On 23 July 2015, the new council voted in favour of a motion to change the official name of the city to Derry and to write to Mark H. Durkan, Northern Ireland Minister of the Environment, to ask how the change could be effected. Unionist councillors called the decision "sectarian" and "disgusting", and in August submitted an official challenge to the request. Rival change.org petitions for and against the proposal were started. In October and November in the House of Lords, minister Lord Dunlop gave two answers on the matter to unionist Lord Laird, who claimed any name change would require cross-community consensus under the Good Friday Agreement. The first stated "The Government, on occasion receives requests to change names of towns and cities. At this time the Government does not intend to change the name of the City of Londonderry." The second said it would "only do so with consensus". Unionists interpreted this as a definitive rejection.

=== Other official names ===
In 1994, the city council voted, again along nationalist–unionist lines, to rename "Londonderry Eglinton Airport" to "City of Derry Airport", coinciding with the opening of a new terminal building.

Some commentators have suggested that "Derry" is less justifiable as a name for the county than for the city, since the county has never officially been called "Derry". William Houston of Londonderry Unionist Association said in 1995:

Now the nationalists can perhaps have some argument that the name [of the city] was Derry before it was Londonderry, but they certainly cannot say the same of the county. There never ever was a "County Derry", — it was "County Coleraine", and bodies such as the Derry County Board of the Ancient Order of Hibernians and of the Gaelic Athletic Board are a total misnomer.

== Incidents ==
A visible sign of the dispute to the visitor is in the road signs; those pointing to the city from the Republic refer to it as Derry (and in Irish, Doire), whilst signs in Northern Ireland use Londonderry. It is not uncommon to see vandalised road signs—the "London" part of the name spray painted over on "Londonderry" road signs by nationalists, or occasionally "London" added to "Derry" signs by unionists. Some sign-posts are even occasionally vandalised in such a way that "London" is replaced with the word "Free" (see Free Derry).

In 2001, the Londonderry Provident Building Society, founded in 1876, changed its name to City of Derry Building Society, in part due to ongoing vandalism of its branch signs. Mark Durkan alleged that there was no press release after a meeting in the city of the 1998–2002 Northern Ireland Executive because David Trimble insisted any release must use only Londonderry.

In 2003, Lord Laird asked in the House of Lords why a recent press release by the Arts Council of Northern Ireland had listed grants for "Derry City" rather than "Londonderry City"; he was told the heading should have been "Derry City Council area".

In 2005, a judge in the Republic complained when a defendant's address was written as "Londonderry", stating "It's just Derry with a capital D." Arlene Foster said she would complain to the Irish Minister for Justice.

In 2007, a Canadian tourist in Belfast asking for a Translink bus ticket to "Derry" was confused when told that Derry "didn't exist". The incident was reported in the media and the bus company apologised and disciplined the employee responsible.

In the Republic's state Leaving Certificate examination in geography in 2009, a map of Ireland's counties included the label "Londonderry" rather than "Derry". The State Examinations Commission explained the map was sourced from the European Society for Geography. Cecilia Keaveney criticised the incident in the Seanad, saying "If we must have 'Londonderry', we should also have 'Derry'. ... it is offensive and insensitive to the majority of people to use 'Londonderry' at the total exclusion of 'Derry'." Brian Ó Domhnaill and Trevor Ó Clochartaigh objected in 2017 when maps in a report by the republic's Constituency Commission named the county "Londonderry". The Football Association of Ireland apologised after a women's international match programme included county "Londonderry" on a map.

In a 2012 debate in Dáil Éireann, minister Alan Shatter referred to "two pipe bombs set off in Londonderry on the 19th of January 2012". His use of "Londonderry" rather than "Derry" attracted comment on social media. He later told the BBC "I would use either the term Derry or Londonderry interchangeably ... It's a place that I want to see live in peace and I don't have hang-ups about which name you attach to it."

Sinn Féin leader Mary Lou McDonald described April 2018 meetings with unionists in the city as "an engagement with young people with interests across Derry, or Londonderry". She responded to republican criticism of her use of "Londonderry" by saying "I used the term to reflect the fact that we had a dialogue – a really good one – with people who see things differently to us."

== Response to the dispute ==
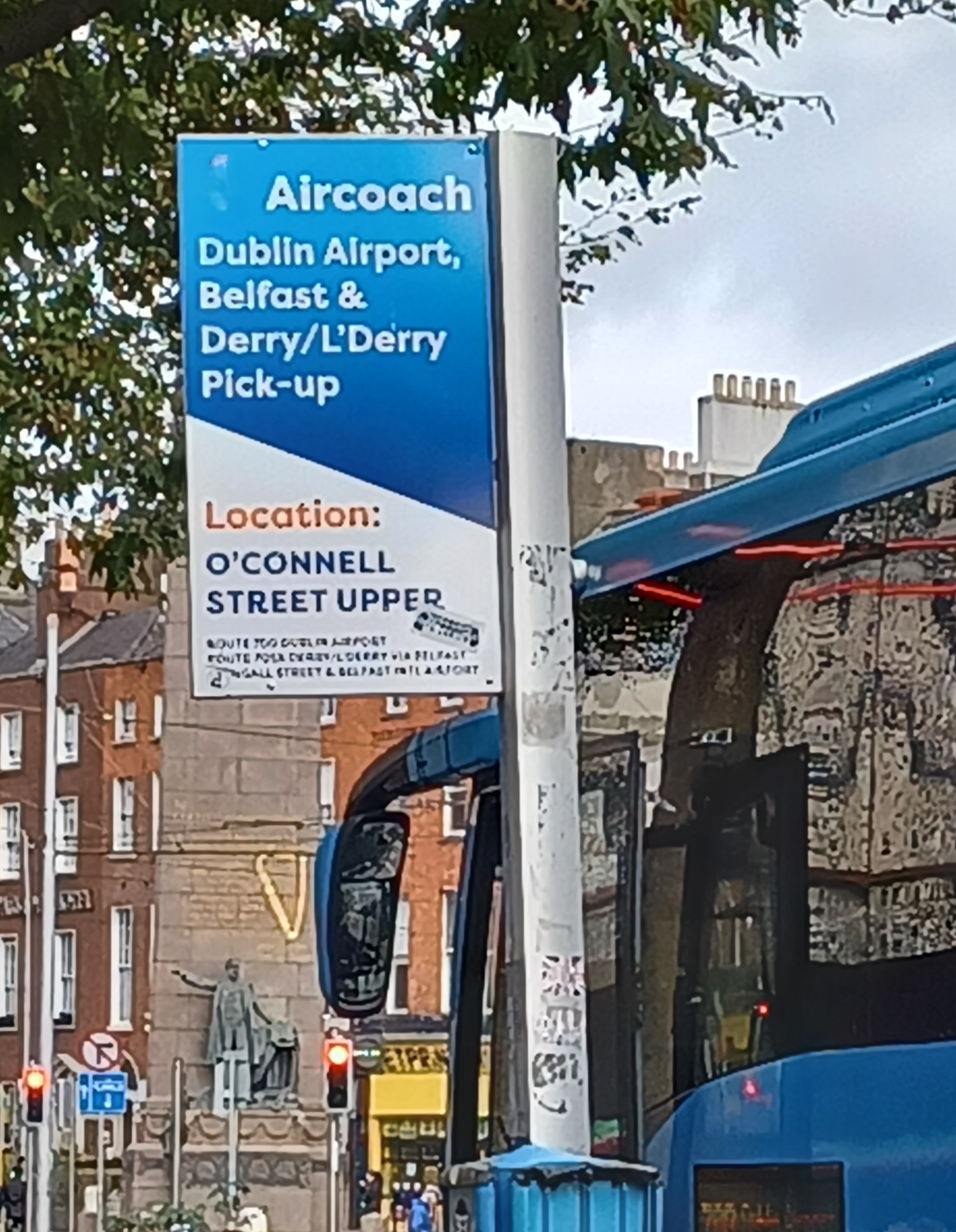
Aircoach stop in Dublin, referring to "Derry/L'Derry"

A suggested compromise dual naming of "Derry/Londonderry" (read "Derry stroke Londonderry") has given rise to the jocular nickname "Stroke City". Gerry Anderson, a local radio presenter who espoused this term, became known briefly as "Gerry/Londongerry". The city was made UK City of Culture for 2013; the organising committee's official logo read "Derry~Londonderry" (spoken as "Derry Londonderry"), Radio 1's Big Weekend, an annual BBC festival held in the city in 2013, adopted this name in print and for its presenters. The City of Culture was name sponsor of the boat Derry~Londonderry in the 2011–12 Clipper Round the World Yacht Race, and Derry and Strabane Council sponsored Derry~Londonderry~Doire in the 2013–14 and 2015–16 races. Northern Ireland Secretary, Theresa Villiers, used "Derry-Londonderry" in a 2012 speech in the city.

Another attempt to mitigate the controversy is via such abbreviations a "L'derry" or "L-Derry". (On the other hand, the abbreviation "Londond'y" is seen as unionist.) Another suggested compromise is to call the city "Derry" and the county "Londonderry"; this is common among historians of early modern Ireland.

NI Railways use "Derry/Londonderry" on the destination boards and automated announcements of any trains bound for the city, and use the truncated version of "L/Derry" on all railway tickets to Waterside station. Additionally, the timetables for the Belfast–Derry railway line are printed with both "Derry Line" and "Londonderry Line" covers. The electronic online timetables use "Londonderry" in the route name and "Derry" on the timetable detail lines. The online PDF version uses "Derry~Londonderry Line" on the cover and "Londonderry" on the timetable detail lines.

The tourism agencies for the city, Northern Ireland and the island of Ireland have a mixed attitude. The city's tourism office calls itself Visit Derry. However, all the tourism agencies used the dual name "Derry-Londonderry" for the city, while the traditional county itself is referred as "Londonderry", whereas they try and use the term "North West" for the area in general.

Among airlines that fly or have flown to City of Derry airport, the attitude is mixed. Low-cost carrier Irish-owned Ryanair use "Derry", British-owned easyJet use "Derry - Londonderry" and regional airline Loganair uses "City of Derry".

=== Correspondence ===
Common practice in the Northern Ireland Civil Service, Derry City Council, and in communication throughout business and other organisations within Northern Ireland, when responding to a letter from a correspondent from the city or county, is to reply using the same nomenclature as the initial communication. Therefore, a letter addressed to Derry will be replied to an address in Derry, while a letter addressed from Londonderry will be returned to an address in Londonderry. When the UK directory enquiries service was demonopolised in 2003, Oftel guidelines specifically required addresses using either name to be accessible.

The Police Ombudsman uses "Londonderry/Derry" or "Derry/Londonderry" on first use, and follows the correspondent's usage thereafter. It also says "The 'City of Derry' is an actual title and can be used in full."

People born in the city applying for British passports may use either name for the "place of birth" field. In April 2009, the Irish government announced a similar policy for Irish passports, where previously "Derry" had been required.

=== Avoidance strategies ===
Businesses, sports clubs and other organisations in the area will frequently avoid using Derry or Londonderry in their names. This is partly so that they can avoid alienating potential customers or users from either side of the community.

Many name themselves after the River Foyle, which flows through the city. The BBC's regional radio station for the area is BBC Radio Foyle. The Westminster constituency of Foyle (and coterminous Northern Ireland Assembly constituency of the same name) encompassing the city and environs was so named partly to avoid the naming controversy and also because until 1997 it contained parts of County Tyrone. The constituency was created in 1979, when the previous "Londonderry" constituency was split in two; the other part, "East Londonderry", is strongly unionist. The APNI suggested Foyle as a name for the district council area during the 1984 renaming controversy.

Other entities based in the area call themselves "North-West". This may refer to the northwest of Northern Ireland or the northwest of Ulster including County Donegal in the Republic. Ulster University encouraged this use in its 2010–2015 style guide. A 1985 SDLP discussion paper suggested "North West" would be a "good compromise" rename for the county court and petty sessional divisions then named Londonderry. They had not been renamed by the time of their abolitions in 2013 and 2016 respectively, when new "administrative court divisions" were all given directional names. (Note: The administrative court divisions are named "North Eastern Division", "South Eastern Division", and "Western Division", the last including Derry city.) This strategy has been adopted by Translink for the North-West Transport Hub which hosts the city's railway station, at the site of the former Belfast and Northern Counties Railway station at Waterside, which opened on 21 October 2019.

The nickname "Maiden City" is sometimes utilised; for example, the Ulsterbus service from Belfast to Derry is called The Maiden City Flyer. This alludes to the city's having resisted capture in the siege of 1689. However, since the siege is an event celebrated by unionism, the nickname is itself politically charged. The Northern Ireland Tourist Board has used "the Walled City" and "Legenderry" [also "LegenDerry"] in marketing the area and naming visitor events and attractions.

The Derry Theatre Trust consulted the public for the name of the theatre it opened at East Wall in 2001. "Derry Civic Theatre" and "Londonderry Civic Theatre" were rejected in favour of "Millennium Forum".

=== Style guides ===
The style guides for different media organisations address the issue variously:

Australian Broadcasting Corporation
Londonderry, Derry: In news stories, first reference for city and county: Londonderry. Second and subsequent, if you like: Derry.
BBC News
"The city and county are Londonderry. The city should be given the full name at first reference, but Derry can be used later." Account may be taken for the context.
The Economist
- Derry/Londonderry (use in this full dual form at least on first mention; afterwards, plain Derry will do)
- Londonderry (Derry also permissible)
The Guardian and The Observer
Londonderry: use Derry and County Derry
The Times
Londonderry, but Derry City Council; (Note: The guide predates the 2015 change in council structure.) and Derry when in direct quotes or in a specifically republican context (this latter rarely)
Ulster University
The style guide, updated in 2015, states:

Derry~Londonderry is the official name of the city and is the preferred form of use for the University in all written materials. Where it is not practical to use the Derry~Londonderry form, e.g. on social media posts or in media interviews, a limited number of variations may be used.

"County Londonderry" is used in giving the address of the campuses in Coleraine and in Derry city. (Note: Thus the prescribed address for the latter is: Ulster University Northland Road Derry~Londonderry County Londonderry BT48 7JL)

The university's 2012–2015 guide specified "Derry~Londonderry" for both city and county, except "Londonderry" for each in the addresses of its campuses. The 2010–2012 guide cited the BBC guidelines. The nicknames "Maiden City" and "Stroke City" were specifically prohibited.

== In popular culture ==
The Divine Comedy song "Sunrise" begins "I was born in Londonderry / I was born in Derry City too" and later asks "Who cares what name you call a town? / Who'll care when you're six feet beneath the ground?"

Irish comedian Neil Delamere once remarked on the RTÉ television show The Panel that the RTÉ pronunciation guide is effectively the same as its BBC counterpart, except the word "Londonderry", in which the first six letters are silent.

When performing in the city, fellow comedian Dara Ó Briain, has opened with the joke, "Hello my name is Dara or, if you prefer, you can call me Londondara."

Different mnemonic acronyms are used to remember the names of the six counties of Northern Ireland: "FAT LAD" for Londonderry, "FAT DAD" for Derry.

== Derived names ==
Among places and other entities named after the city or county, some have Derry (such as Derry City F.C.) while others have Londonderry (such as the Marquess of Londonderry). These names are often not subject to the same politically charged alternation as the names of city and county. The BBC apologised to Derry GAA in 2018 after a sports results broadcast called the county team Londonderry.

The Apprentice Boys of Derry is thus named despite being a Protestant, unionist organisation; the event it commemorates is generally called the "Siege of Derry". The city's Church of Ireland diocese is Derry and Raphoe; like the Roman Catholic Diocese of Derry, it traces its origin to 1154.

The New Hampshire town of Derry in the United States seceded in 1827 from its western neighbour, Londonderry, incorporated in 1722 for Scotch-Irish immigrants. The town boundary followed the 1740 church split between east and west parishes, which supported opposite sides in the Old Side–New Side Controversy.

=== Geocodes ===
Some geocoding systems use an abbreviation of a placename as its codename.

Code	Code type	Location designated	Notes
LDY	IATA airport code	City of Derry Airport	
GB LDY	UN/LOCODE	Londonderry Port and City of Derry Airport	
GB-DRS	ISO 3166-2:GB	Derry and Strabane council area	Also BS 6879. The pre-2015 Derry City Council area had code GB-DRY
LDY	Chapman code	County Londonderry	

== Sources ==
- EQIA: two versions of the Equality Impact Assessment of the Resolution to make application to the Privy Council to have the name of the City changed from Londonderry to Derry are on the Derry City Council website:
  - Draft Report has an Appendix with details of the 2009 Name Change Research survey
  - Summary Report has Five Appendices, including the submissions from the CRC (Appendix 4) and ECNI (Appendix 5); the latter are also available from the CRC and ECNI websites:
    - Northern Ireland Community Relations Council (October 2009) RE: EQIA of the Resolution to make application to the Privy Council to have the name of the City changed from Londonderry to Derry (MS Word)
    - Equality Commission for Northern Ireland (September 2009) Response to EQIA: Derry City Council Consultation on the "Resolution to make application to the Privy Council to have the name of the City changed from Londonderry to Derry" (PDF)
- Lacey, Brian (1990). Siege city : the story of Derry and Londonderry. Belfast: Blackstaff Press. ISBN 0-85640-443-8.
- Moore, Ruth, ed. (1996). "First Public Discussion: The Name Of this City? Central Library, February 19, 1995". A Report on a Series of Public Discussions on Aspects of Sectarian Division in Derry Londonderry. Derry: Templegrove Action Research. ISBN 1900071002. OCLC 59639819 – via Conflict Archive on the Internet.
- O'Leary, Cornelius; Elliott, Sydney; Wilford, R. A. (1988). The Northern Ireland Assembly, 1982–1986: A Constitutional Experiment. London; New York: C. Hurst; St. Martin's Press. ISBN 978-0-312-02714-8 – via Internet Archive.
- "Editorial Style Guide" (PDF). Ulster University. May 2015. Archived from the original (PDF) on 26 October 2020.
- Weatherup, Ronald Eccles (25 January 2007). "Application by Derry City Council for judicial review" (PDF). Judgments. Lord Chief Justice of Northern Ireland. [2007] NIQB 5 Ref WEAF5707.
- Wroe, Ann (2018). "Useful reference". The Economist Style Guide (12th ed.). Profile. ISBN 978-1-78283-348-2.
