= Ballygroll Prehistoric Landscape =

Northern Irish monument site

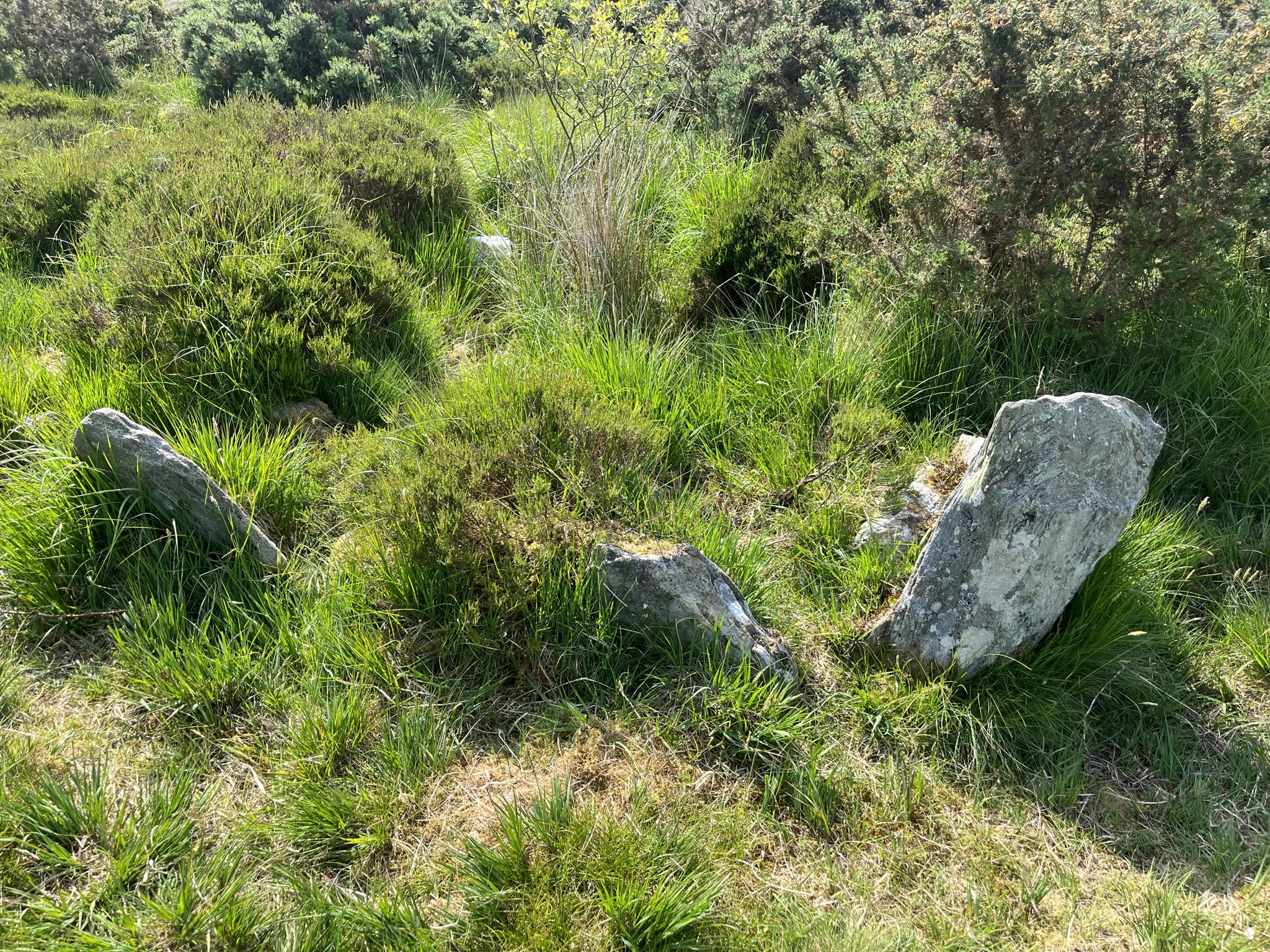
- An example of a wedge tomb in the landscape.

- Location within Northern Ireland
- 54.9677°N 7.16814°W
- Type: Collection of prehistoric monuments
- Location: Ballygroll, County Londonderry, Northern Ireland

History
- Built: From the Neolithic to the Late Bronze Age

Site notes
- Area: 11 acres (4.5 ha)
- Governing body: Department for Communities

Scheduled monument
- Type: Monument in State Care
- Condition: Varied - Some remains to well preserved
- Local Authority: Derry City and Strabane

Ballygroll Prehistoric Landscape is an 11-acre site in the townland of Ballygroll, County Londonderry, Northern Ireland. It is a Scheduled Monument and a Monument in State Care. The range and extent of the monuments is remarkable ranging in age from the Neolithic Period until the Late Bronze Age. Most of the monuments on the site have not been fully excavated but it includes several cairns, alignments, standing stones, three different types of grave, a barrow, and a field wall system.

== Background ==
The area around the south and west flanks of Loughermore Mountain was first recorded as being an area with a significant number of ancient monuments in Ordnance Survey memoirs in 1835. However, many of these monuments have been damaged or destroyed. In 1815, a 'Giant’s Grave' was damaged by the landowner when he heard there was treasure buried there. He dug into the grave and removed two flag stones. It is likely that other monuments in the area were destroyed by others in a vain search for treasure over the years. Other monuments were destroyed as the area began to be turned from peat bog, which had preserved the monuments, into arable land. Around 1970 some of the ancient field walls were completely removed in the Highmoor townland, just north of Ballygroll. The whole area was threatened with further damage or destruction by a scheme planned for 1978, however an 11-acre site was saved, when the land was transferred to the Department of the Environment in 1973.

The first proper description of the monuments occurred in 1940, however no full excavations occurred until 1978 when a 6m square segment of the field walls in the Mullaboy townland were excavated. A second excavation occurred in 1979 when archaeologists excavated a covered mound that they discovered was a barrow. The remaining sites have not been fully excavated, and are all at least partly covered in a layer of peat.

== List of Ancient Monuments ==
The following list describes the different ancient monuments that are part of the site.

Type	Excavated?	Condition	Description
Court tomb	No	Some remains	The most northerly of the monuments of the site, it is also likely the oldest. One orthostat remains of a façade leading to a roofless gallery. The grave contains two chambers, only one of which has been left undisturbed.
Barrow and pit	Fully	Well preserved	Excavated in 1979 it was discovered to be a barrow 4m in diameter with a further 7m earthen (something). Radiocarbon dating shows the barrow to have been created around 730 BC, which places it in the Late Bronze Age. Below the barrow is a much earlier pit, radiocarbon dated to roughly 1920 BC. As no items were found during the excavation, the purpose of either the barrow or pit cannot be confirmed. However, as no bones were discovered, it is unlikely that it was used for burials.
Wedge grave	No	Well preserved	At the site there is the presence of a well-defined heel-shaped cairn and is likely an intact wedge grave.
Cist grave	No	Some remains	The site is set within a cairn and heavily covered in bog. It is framed by a single slab and it is unroofed and dug out. It is likely a cist grave.
Stone circle	No	Some remains	The western of two stone circles, set a few metres apart. This one is made of two concentric circles, with the outer circle containing 18 stones and the inner circle containing 17 stones.
Stone circle	No	Some remains	The eastern of two stone circles, set a few metres apart. This one is a partial circle comprising 21 stones. There are five stones set outside of this circle which may form part of an alignment running east.
Wedge grave	Partially	Substantial remains	A wedge grave which includes three orthostats and a capstone, with outer walling on both sides. When the site was first properly documented, some pottery was found underneath the capstone.
Cist graves	No	Well preserved	Two recumbent stones that are a short distance from each other. Both are likely capstones to two cist graves.
Cairn	No	Well preserved	Heather covered cairn that has been significantly dug out.
Wedge grave	No	Some remains	The small, complex, Neolithic structure is likely a wedge grave. It is one of the structures on the site most visible to visitors.
Cist grave	No	Some remains	A recumbent stone that is likely the capstone to a cist grave. It is considered part of the scheduled monument but is slightly south of the land owned by the government.
Standing stones	No	Well preserved	Two small quartz stones that may form part of a larger set of stones that remain uncovered. Only identified in 2008 due to heather burn.
Standing stones	No	Well preserved	Two small schist stones. Only identified in 2008 due to heather burn.
Stone alignment	No	Well preserved	Alignment of at least six stones over a distance of 8.5m and first identified in 2008.
Stone alignment	No	Well preserved	Alignment of at least three stones, set between 0.3m and 2m apart. First identified in 2008 due to heather burn.
Field walls	Partially	Some remains	Seven field walls have been identified within the landscape, however some of them fall outside of the area owned by the government. In 1978 a 6m square segment was excavated. Radiocarbon dating from peat samples taken from underneath a collapsed section of the wall roughly corresponded with 80 BC.
