= Mullaghmore, County Londonderry =

Peak in Northern Ireland

Coordinates: 54°50′58.909″N 6°51′3.532″W

Mullaghmore
- an Mullach Mór
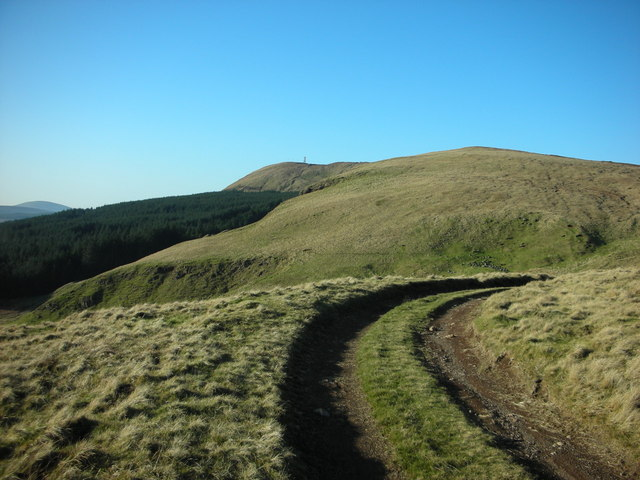

Highest point
- Elevation: 550 m (1,800 ft)
- Prominence: 235 m (771 ft)
- Listing: Marilyn

Geography
- Location: County Londonderry, Northern Ireland
- Parent range: Sperrin Mountains
- OSI/OSNI grid: C739008
- Topo map: OSNI Discoverer Series 8 (1:50000)

Mullaghmore (from Irish an Mullach Mór 'the big summit') is a mountain in County Londonderry, Northern Ireland. It is part of the Sperrins and the 359th highest point on the island of Ireland The summit is dominated by a large telecommunication tower. The peak is located 5 miles north of the village of Draperstown, and 6 miles south of Dungiven. It is also locally known as, "The Birren" hence the road name passing over it is "Birren Road"
