= River Faughan =

River in County Londonderry, Northern Ireland

Coordinates: 54.870751°N 7.070453°W

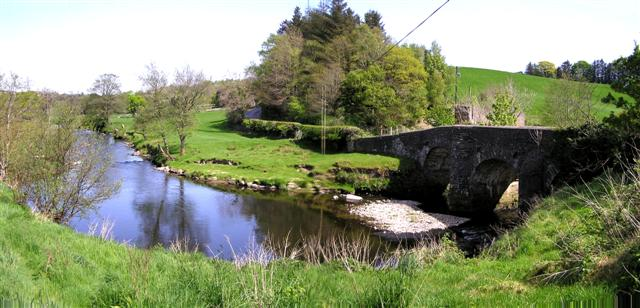
- Cumber Bridge, Claudy
- Etymology: Fochain, character in Irish legend
- Native name: An Fhochaine (Irish)

Location
- Sovereign State: United Kingdom
- Constituent Country: Northern Ireland
- Cities: Claudy, Derry

Physical characteristics
- Source
  - location: Sawel Mountain, County Londonderry
- Mouth
  - location: North Channel at Derry via Lough Foyle
- Length: 47.5 km (29.5 mi)
- Basin size: 295 km^{2} (114 sq mi)
- Discharge
  - average: 10.72 m^{3}/s (379 cu ft/s)

Basin features
- Tributaries
  - left: Glenrandall River

The River Faughan (/ˈfɒhən/; Irish: An Fhochaine) is a river in northwest Northern Ireland.

== Legend ==
According to Lebor Gabála Érenn (11th century), Fochain was a daughter of Partholón, an ancient settler of Ireland. In the Táin Bó Cúailnge, Cúchulainn meets with Medb and Fergus mac Róich in Glenn Fochaine. A more prosaic etymology could be the Old Irish fochaín, "smooth-bottomed."

== Course ==
The River Faughan rises on Sawel Mountain, north of Park and flows northwestwards through Claudy, crossing the A6 west of Drumahoe. It flows northwards on the eastern edge of Derry city, being bridged by the A2 between Campsey and Strathfoyle. The Faughan enters Lough Foyle east of Coolkeeragh power station.

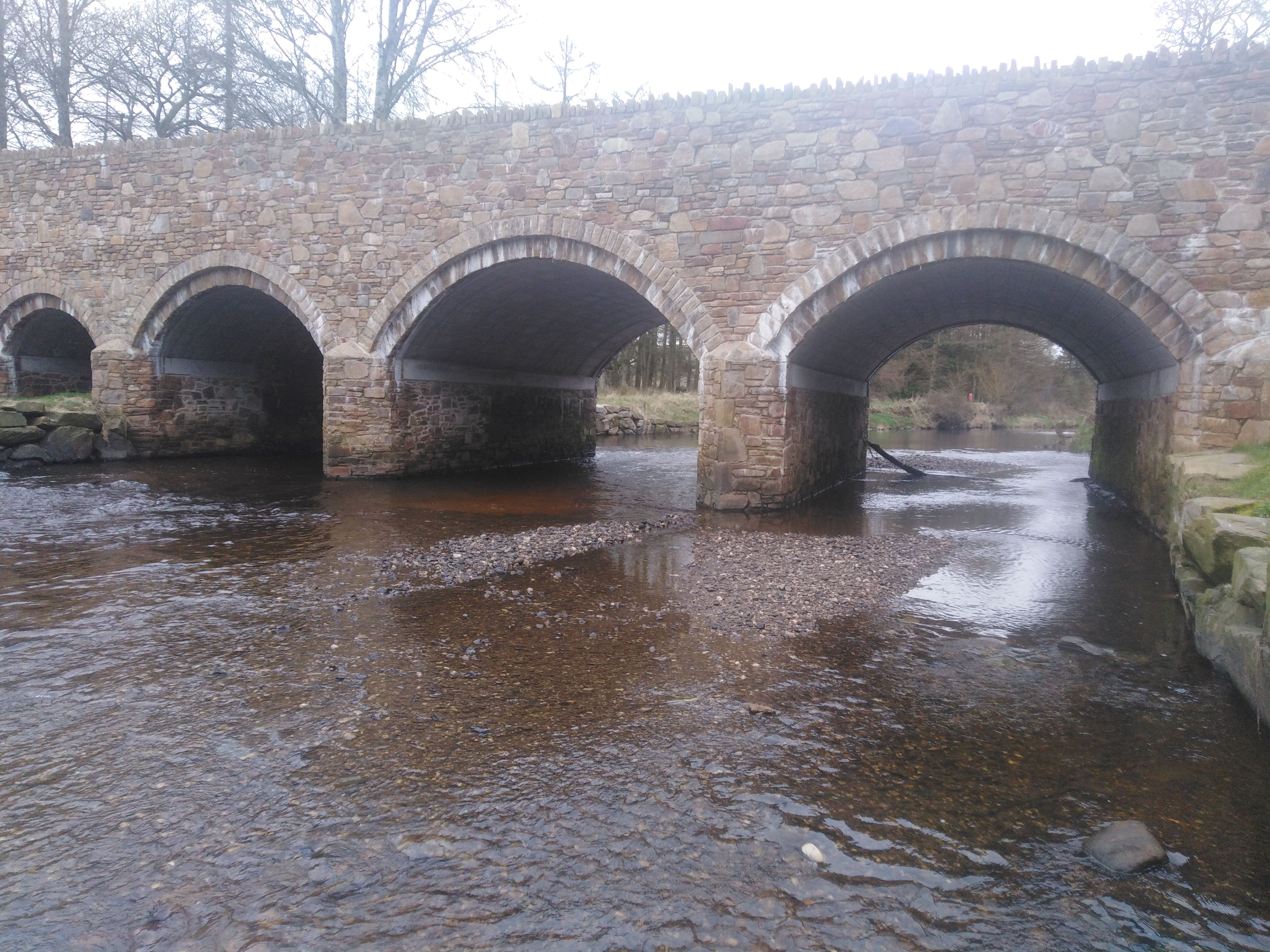
Ballynameen Bridge Claudy reconstructed in 2018 after the original bridge was washed away during the Great Flood of 2017

== Wildlife ==
The River Faughan is a brown trout and salmon fishery.

== In culture ==
"The Faughan Side" is a traditional Irish song from the early 20th century, notably collected from the singing of Eddie Butcher.

The river gives its name to Faughan Valley Golf Club, near Eglinton.

== See also ==
- Rivers of Ireland
