= Mullaghcarn =

Mountain in Northern Ireland

- Mullach Cairn
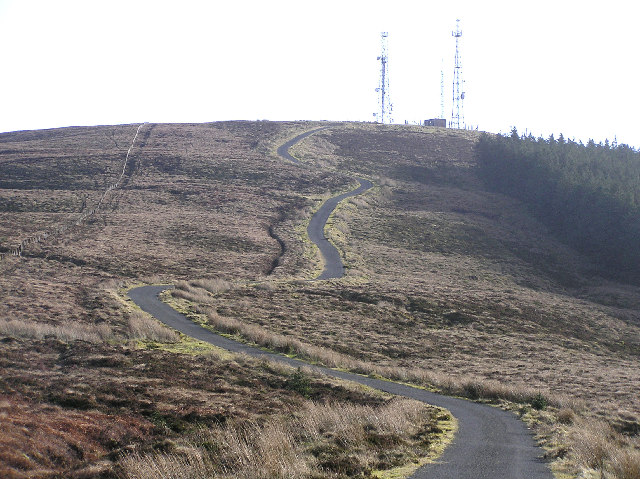
- Near the summit of Mullaghcarn

Highest point
- Elevation: 542 m (1,778 ft)
- Listing: Marilyn
- Coordinates: 54°40′27.541″N 7°12′33.941″W

Naming
- English translation: peak of the cairns
- Language of name: Irish

Geography
- Location within Northern Ireland
- Location: County Tyrone, Northern Ireland
- Parent range: Sperrins
- OSI/OSNI grid: H5180
- Topo map: OSNI Discoverer 13

Mullaghcarn (from Irish Mullach Cairn, meaning 'peak of the cairns') is a mountain in the southwest Sperrins, County Tyrone, Northern Ireland. The peak reaches a height of 542 m (1778 ft), and is the 370th highest in Ireland. Mullaghcarn is in the Fermanagh and Omagh District Council area, on the edge of Gortin Glen Forest Park, and is the most southerly peak in the Sperrins. It is 5 miles (8.0 km) northeast of Omagh, and is 3.1 miles (5.0 km) south of Gortin.

== Nature ==
Mullaghcarn is steep, and has a rocky summit. The west of the mountain is home to conifers. "Acid" grassland is the most common on Mullaghcarn, and peat is not especially common, due to the draining of the eastern mountain. Heather is most common on the northern slopes. The red grouse can be found on heathland around Mullaghcarn.

== History ==
Mullaghcarn was home to firing ranges during World War II. These were used by the police and US Army soldiers stationed in the area.

== Gallery ==
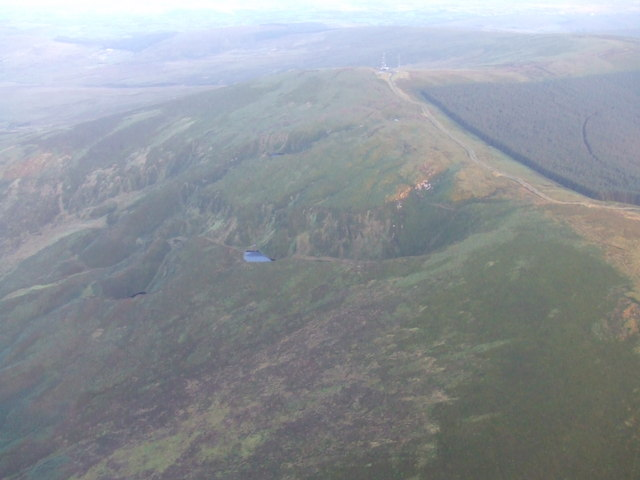
The summit of Mullaghcarn from above

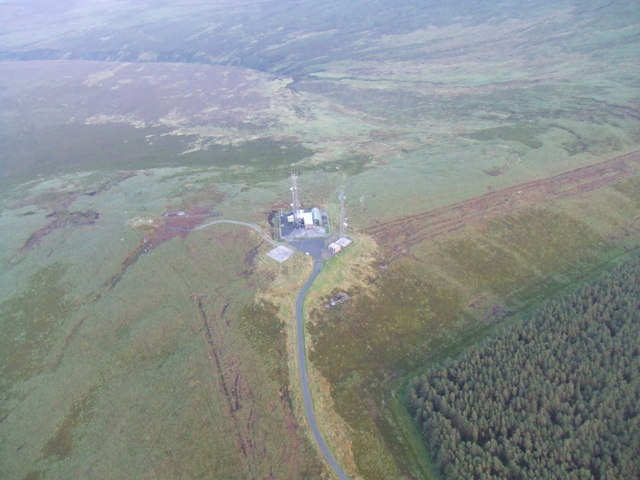
The summit of Mullaghcarn from above

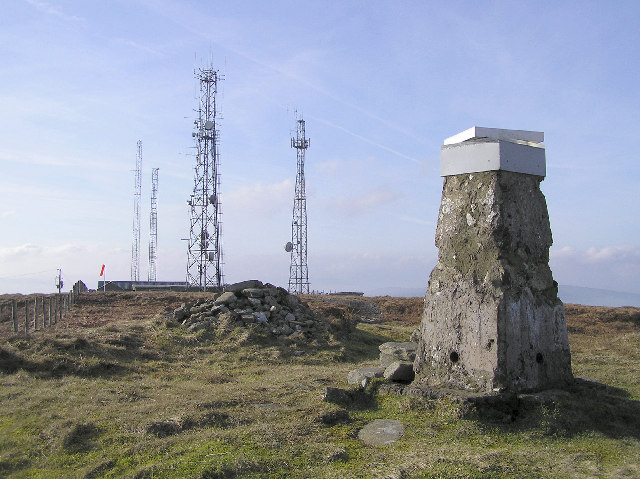
Looking east from summit, towards the cairn, two telecommunications masts and helipad
