= Sawel Mountain =

Mountain in Northern Ireland

Sawel
- Samhail or Samhail Phite Méabha
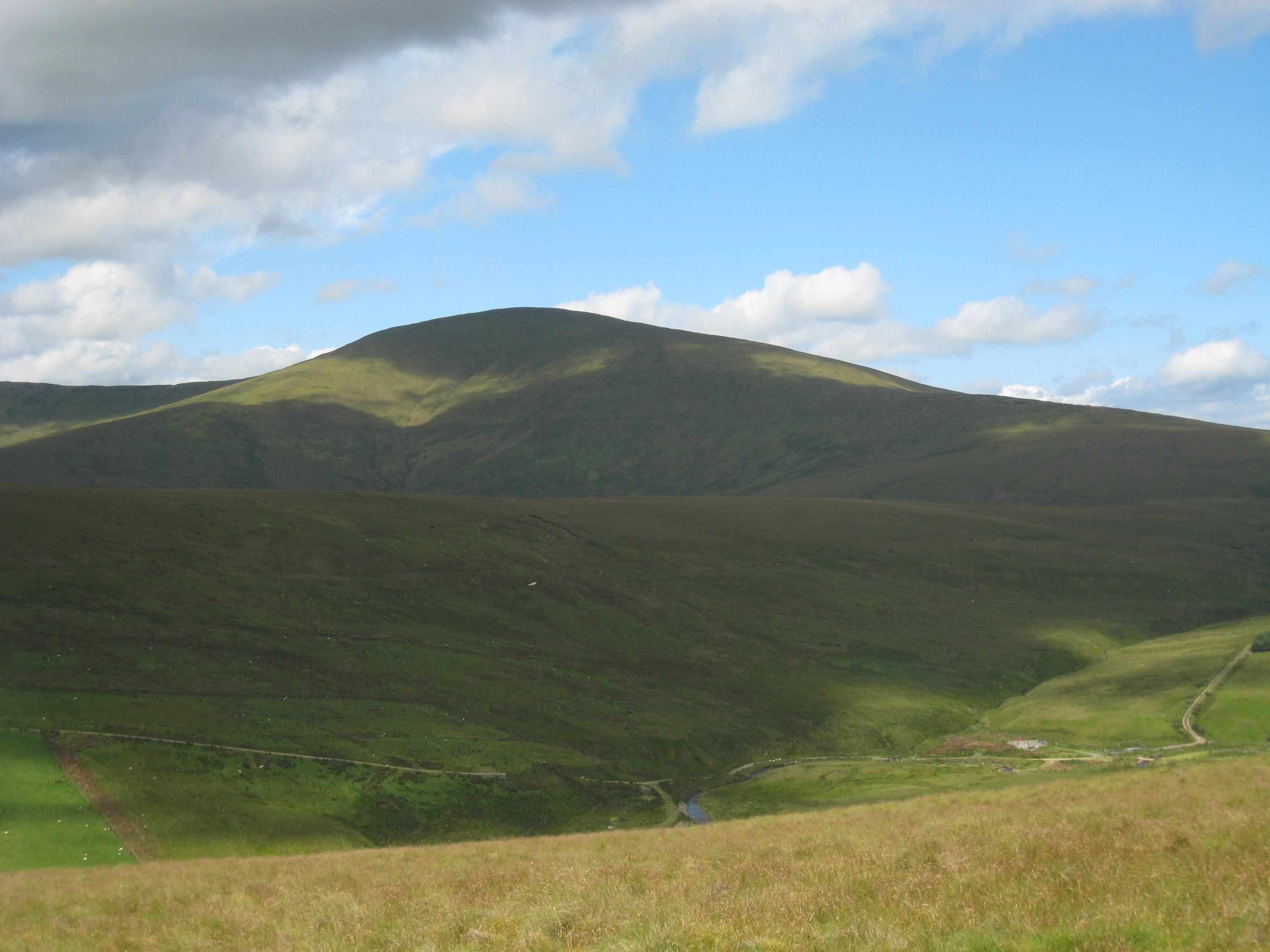
- Sawel as seen from the southeast.

Highest point
- Elevation: 678 m (2,224 ft)
- Prominence: 580 m (1,900 ft)
- Listing: County Top (Londonderry and Tyrone), Marilyn, Hewitt
- Coordinates: 54°49′N 7°02′W

Naming
- English translation: likeness to Méabh's vulva
- Language of name: Irish

Geography
- Location within Northern Ireland Location within island of Ireland Location within the United Kingdom
- Location: County Londonderry/County Tyrone, Northern Ireland
- Parent range: Sperrins
- OSI/OSNI grid: H618973
- Topo map(s): OSNI Discoverer Series 13 The Sperrins (1:50000), OSNI Activity Map Sperrins (1:25000)

Geology
- Mountain type(s): Psammite & semipellite

Sawel Mountain (from Irish Samhail Phite Méabha, meaning 'the likeness of Méabh's vulva') is the highest peak in the Sperrin Mountains, and the 8th highest in Northern Ireland. It is also the highest mountain in Northern Ireland outside of the Mourne Mountain range located in County Down.

== Geography ==
To the north of Sawel is County Londonderry and to the south, County Tyrone. The summit is 678 metres (2,224 ft) high and is composed of crystalline limestone. Around the peak, there is "montane heathland", with plant life including heather, bilberries and cowberries, although this is being damaged by hillwalking and grazing. Sawel is the source of the River Faughan, a 29 miles (47 km) long tributary of the River Foyle.

== Naming ==
The Irish name of the mountain is a reference to a glen or hollow on the side of Sawel. It was also historically called Slieve Sawel, from the Irish word sliabh ("mountain").

== Plane crash ==
On 5 January 1944 a Royal Navy Stinson Reliant (FK914) of 878 Naval Air Squadron was on a flight from RNAS Eglinton (HMS Gannet) to RNAS Machrihanish (HMS Landrail) when it crashed into Sawel Mountain in bad weather, killing all three crew. Due to snow drifts on the mountain the bodies of the crew weren't recovered until 29 January.

== See also ==
- Sliabh Beagh
- Lists of mountains in Ireland
- Lists of mountains and hills in the British Isles
- List of Marilyns in the British Isles
- List of Hewitt mountains in England, Wales and Ireland
