= Sperrins =

Mountain range in Northern Ireland

The Sperrins
- Sliabh Speirín (Irish)
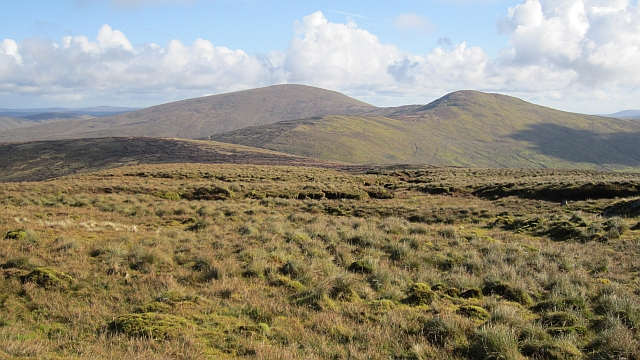
- Looking towards Sawel and Dart mountains

Highest point
- Peak: Sawel Mountain
- Elevation: 678 m (2,224 ft)

Geography
- Sovereign state: United Kingdom
- Constituent country: Northern Ireland
- Counties: County Tyrone, County Londonderry
- Range coordinates: 54°48′00″N 7°04′59″W

Geology
- Orogeny: Caledonian orogeny
- Rock type(s): Schist, quartzite, granite, basalt, rhyolite
- AONB map: Map of the AONB in Northern Ireland

The Sperrins or Sperrin Mountains (Irish: Sliabh Speirín) are a mountain range in Northern Ireland. The range stretches from Strabane and Mullaghcarn in the west, to Slieve Gallion and the Glenshane Pass in the east, in the counties of Tyrone and Londonderry. The landscape is mostly moorland and blanket bog. The region has a population of some 150,000 and is a designated Area of Outstanding Natural Beauty.

== Features ==
It has a distinctive glaciated landscape. The mountains mostly have rounded summits and the landscape is mainly moorland and blanket bog. The Glenshane Pass, part of the A6 Belfast to Derry road, is in the mountains and has notoriously bad weather in winter. Sawel Mountain is the highest peak in the Sperrins, and the eighth highest in Northern Ireland. Its summit rises to 678 m (2,224 ft). Another of the Sperrins, Carntogher (464 m), towers over the Glenshane Pass.

Geologically, the Sperrins are formed mostly from Precambrian metamorphic rocks, with some younger Ordovician igneous rocks in the southern flank of the range. The mountains are very sparsely populated and provide habitat for a diverse range of birds and mammals. Red fox, Sika Deer, Pine Marten and Red Squirrels are commonly found there alongside Peregrine Falcons, Buzzards and Sparrowhawks. Visiting Golden Eagles from the neighbouring reintroduced Donegal population have been sighted across the range from Strabane to Draperstown although no breeding population has yet been established. The mountains also provide one of the last refuges of Red Grouse in Northern Ireland.

== List ==
Rank	Name	Irish name	Height	Prominence
1	Sawel Mountain	Samhail Phite Méabha ("likeness of Méabh's vulva")	678 m (2,224 ft)	657 m (2,156 ft)
2	Mullaghclogha	Mullach Clocha ("summit of the stone")	635 m (2,083 ft)	207 m (679 ft)
3	Mullaghaneany	Mullach an Ionaidh ("summit of the wonder")	627 m (2,057 ft)	302 m (991 ft)
4	Meenard	Mín Ard ("high mountain pasture")	620 m (2,030 ft)	85 m (279 ft)
5	Dart Mountain	An Dairt ("the lump")	619 m (2,031 ft)	89 m (292 ft)
6	Mullaghasturrakeen	Mullach an Starraicín ("summit of the steeple")	581 m (1,906 ft)	46 m (151 ft)
7	Mullaghclogher	Mullach Clochair ("summit of the stony patch")	572 m (1,877 ft)	127 m (417 ft)
8	Oughtmore	Ucht Mór ("big mountain breast")	569 m (1,867 ft)	104 m (341 ft)
9	Spelhoagh	Speilg Chuach ("cuckoo rock")	568 m (1,864 ft)	20 m (66 ft)
10	Mullaghdoo	Mullach Dubh ("black summit")	568 m (1,864 ft)	20 m (66 ft)
11	Carnanelly	Carnán Aichle ("little cairn of the lookout")	562 m (1,844 ft)	307 m (1,007 ft)
12	Mullaghmore	Mullach Mór ("big summit")	550 m (1,800 ft)	235 m (771 ft)
13	Mullaghcarn	Mullach Cairn ("summit of the cairn")	542 m (1,778 ft)	377 m (1,237 ft)
14	White Mountain	Sliabh Bán ("white mountain")	537 m (1,762 ft)	42 m (138 ft)
15	Slieve Gallion	Sliabh gCallann ("mountain of the heights")	528 m (1,732 ft)	333 m (1,093 ft)
16	Crockbrack	Cnoc Breac ("speckled hill")	526 m (1,726 ft)	151 m (495 ft)
17	Mullaghcarbatagh	Mullach Carbadach ("boulder-strewn summit")	517 m (1,696 ft)	32 m (105 ft)

== Politics ==
Sperrin was the name of a proposed United Kingdom constituency in the Sixth Periodic Review of Westminster constituencies.

== See also ==
- List of mountains in Ireland
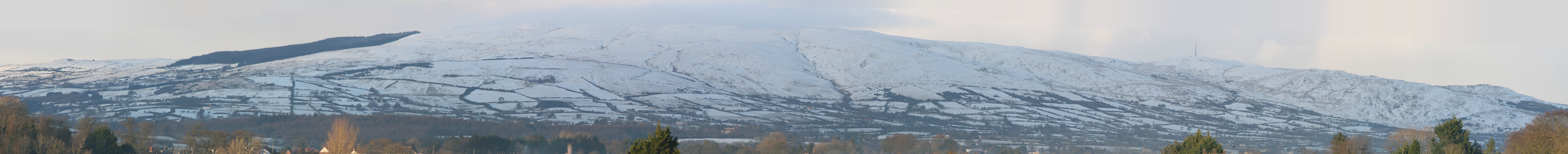
Slieve Gallion in the snow
