= Ordnance Survey Memoirs of Ireland =

Unifinished 1830s topography of Ireland

The Ordnance Memoir of Ireland was a projected 1830s topography of Ireland to be published alongside the maps of the Ordnance Survey of Ireland using materials gathered by surveyors as they traversed the country. The project was cancelled in 1840 as too expensive and beyond the survey's original scope. Material gathered before the cancellation mostly covers Ulster. Much was eventually published in the later twentieth century. The memoirs are a useful primary source for local history and genealogy of the period shortly before the Great Famine.

== Materials ==
Materials gathered for the projected memoir included:

- 1824–1830 journals of the officers of the Royal Engineers in conformance to the "blue book" of instructions from Thomas Colby as head of the Ordnance Survey of Ireland. None of these survive.
- 1830–1837 "statistical remarks" of civil parishes sent by the same officers to Thomas Larcom from his arrival in Dublin. These vary greatly in substance and reliability depending on the interests and abilities of the officer in charge of the particular parish. They are very extensive for counties Londonderry and Antrim, the first and slowest to be surveyed. As the survey matured and progressed east and south through other counties, it picked up speed in completing its primary mapping work, leaving officers less spare time in which to gather material for the memoir .
- 1834–1840 memoir material gathered by the civilian "hill sketchers" sent to revise the original survey in the wake of the Royal Engineers. By 1837 the Engineers ceased collecting material, on the assumption that it would be collected when the area would be revisited by the hill sketchers.
- Geological information gathered by Joseph Ellison Portlock; that relating to County Londonderry (and small adjacent areas) was published in 1843, after which the Geological Survey of Ireland was separated from the Ordnance Survey
- Related to, but separate from, the memoir material are the "Ordnance Survey Letters" and Name Books compiled by John O'Donovan and Eugene O'Curry, of current and historical place names in English and especially Irish, and associated dindsenchas folklore and annalistic references.

== Original publications ==
Only one parish had its memoir published by the Ordnance Survey, namely Templemore, County Londonderry (comprising Derry city and the adjacent North West Liberties of Londonderry) in 1837. This 350-page volume was a poorly edited agglomeration of material whose production cost of £1,700 was three times the original estimate for publishing the whole county. A Topographical Dictionary of Ireland, comprising two volumes plus atlas published in 1837 by Samuel Lewis, was a similar work on a smaller scale, which undermined the case for a publicly funded memoir. The decennial census of 1841 also rendered redundant much of the basic statistical information in the memoirs. Work ceased in 1840. In 1842, Robert Peel, the Prime Minister, was approached by Irish politicians about reviving the memoir, and agreed to have the question considered by a commission, whose report published in 1843 advocated revival. However, only the geological survey was continued.

== Later publications ==
The original memoir material and name books were donated by the Ordnance Survey to the Royal Irish Academy. The Public Record Office of Northern Ireland holds microfilm copies.

In 1911 The O'Rahilly formed the Irish Topographical Society to transcribe and publish the name books and letters. Some Gaelic League members, including Arthur Griffith, worked on this for several years. The project was revived by Father Michael O'Flanagan in 1927 and a typescript was completed in 1930. Local selections were subsequently published, and scans of the originals were published online in 2012.

The memoir text was published from 1990, in 40 volumes plus index, edited by Angélique Day and Patrick McWilliams of the Institute of Irish Studies at Queen's University Belfast. A separate volume of some of the pen-and-ink sketches in the memoirs was published in 2014. The number of volumes per county is: fourteen each for Londonderry and Antrim; four for Down; two each for Donegal, Fermanagh and Tyrone; one for Armagh; and one comprising parts of Cavan, Leitrim, Louth, Monaghan and Sligo. There are brief unpublished statistical remarks for parts of Cork, Galway, Laois, Longford, Mayo, Meath, Roscommon, and Tipperary.

The memoir text and sketches, as well as the name books and letters, are being published online, beginning in 2024, to mark the bicentenary of the establishment of the Irish Ordnance Survey.
