= North West Liberties of Londonderry =

Administrative division in Northern Ireland

North West Liberties of Londonderry Irish: Líbeartaí Thiar Thuaidh Dhoire
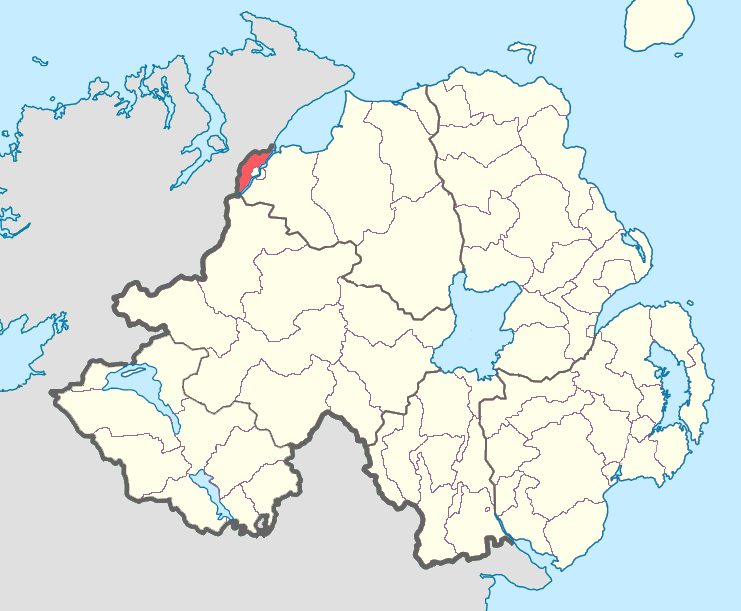
- Location of North West Liberties of Londonderry, County Londonderry, Northern Ireland.
- Sovereign state: United Kingdom
- Country: Northern Ireland
- County: Londonderry

The North West Liberties of Londonderry is a barony in County Londonderry, Northern Ireland. It is bordered by two other baronies in Northern Ireland: Tirkeeran to the east, across Lough Foyle, and Strabane Lower to the south. It also borders two baronies in County Donegal (to whom it has previously belonged to before the creation of County Londonderry) in the Republic of Ireland. It borders Raphoe North, to the south-west; and Inishowen West to the north.

== Boundaries ==
The boundaries of the North West Liberties of Londonderry consist of all parts of County Londonderry on the west bank of the River Foyle that is not a part of the City of Derry, and it borders County Donegal in the Republic of Ireland. The Liberties also historically included the shoreline of the east bank of the Foyle in addition. The original land of the Liberties originally was a part of County Donegal before being transferred to the newly created County Londonderry (comprising the former County Coleraine and parts of County Tyrone) following a redistribution of land during the administration of the Kingdom of Ireland. The North West Liberties has only one administrative parish within it, the parish of Templemore (also known as Temple Derry).

== History ==
The North West Liberties of Londonderry were established by The Honourable The Irish Society when they invested money to rebuild and expand the ruined town and monastic settlement of Derry, which had been destroyed in 1608, and enjoyed heavy influence over how the North West Liberties were run. There was originally doubt as to whether the freeholders of the North West Liberties of Londonderry were to be considered a separate barony from the City of Derry for election purposes. This was clarified in 1800 after an Act of the Parliament of Ireland affirming that freeholders from the North West Liberties of Londonderry were separate from the County Londonderry constituency and were entitled to vote in the Londonderry City constituency. The North West Liberties joined with the newly rebuilt and renamed City of Londonderry (also known as the City of Derry) in establishing a unified Town Watch in 1829, in an agreement that would eventually evolve to become the Londonderry Borough Police. The joint policing partnership between the city and the Liberties was later adsorbed into the jurisdiction of the Royal Irish Constabulary (RIC) following the abolition of the Londonderry Borough Police in 1870.

== List of major settlements ==
- Derry

== List of civil parishes ==
Below is a list of civil parishes in the North West Liberties of Londonderry:

- Templemore
