= County Londonderry =

County in Northern Ireland

County Londonderry Contae Dhoire (Irish) Coontie Lunnonderrie (Ulster-Scots)
- County
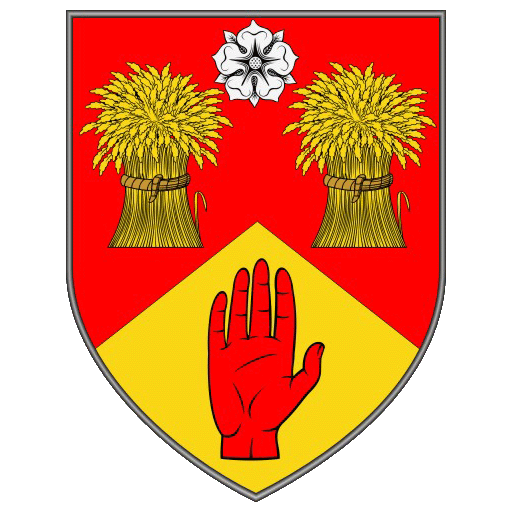
- Coat of arms
- Nickname: The Oak Leaf County
- Motto: Auxilium A Domino (Latin) "Help comes from the Lord"
- Country: United Kingdom
- Constituent country: Northern Ireland
- Province: Ulster
- Established: Date
- County Coleraine: 1585
- County Londonderry: 1613
- County town: Coleraine

Area
  - Total: 818 sq mi (2,118 km^{2})
- Highest elevation (Sawel Mountain): 2,224 ft (678 m)

Population (2021)
  - Total: 252,231
  - Rank: 6th
- Time zone: UTC±0 (GMT)
  - Summer (DST): UTC+1 (BST)
- Postcode area: BT
- Contae Dhoire is the Irish name; Coontie Lunnonderrie is its name in Ulster Scots.

County Londonderry, also known as County Derry, is one of the six counties of Northern Ireland, the nine counties of the province of Ulster, and the thirty-two counties of Ireland. Before the partition of Ireland, it was one of the counties of the Kingdom of Ireland from 1613 onward and then of the United Kingdom after the Acts of Union 1800. Adjoining the north-west shore of Lough Neagh, the county covers an area of 2,118 km^{2} (818 mi^{2}) and today has a population of about 252,231.

Since 1972, the counties in Northern Ireland, including Londonderry, are no longer used for local administration. Following the most recent local government reforms, in 2015, the area of the traditional county is now governed under three different districts: Derry and Strabane, Causeway Coast and Glens and Mid-Ulster. Despite no longer being used for local government and administrative purposes, it is sometimes used in a cultural context in All-Ireland sporting and cultural events (e.g. Derry GAA).

Since 1981, it has become one of four counties in Northern Ireland that has a Catholic majority (55.56% according to the 2001 Census and 61.3% according to the 2021 Census). The county flower is the purple saxifrage.

== Name ==
The place name Derry is an anglicisation of the Old Irish Daire (Modern Irish Doire), meaning "oak-grove" or "oak-wood".

As with the city, its name is subject to the Derry/Londonderry name dispute, with the form "Londonderry" generally preferred by unionists and "Derry" by nationalists. Unlike with the city, however, there has never been a County Derry. County Londonderry was formed mostly from the old County Coleraine (see below). British authorities use the name "Londonderry", while "Derry" is used by the Republic of Ireland.

== History ==
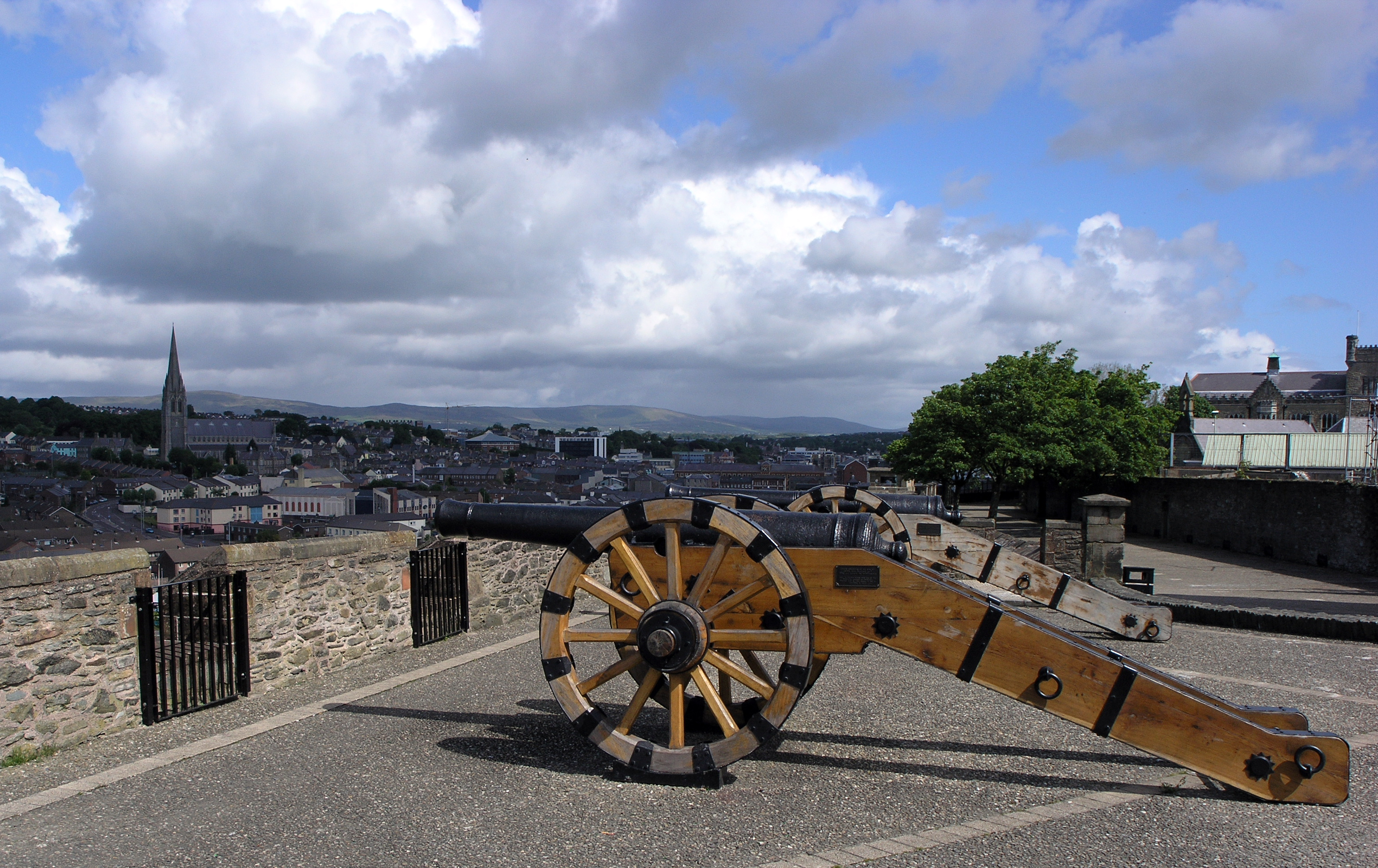
A cannon sits atop the historic Derry Walls, which look over Derry City.

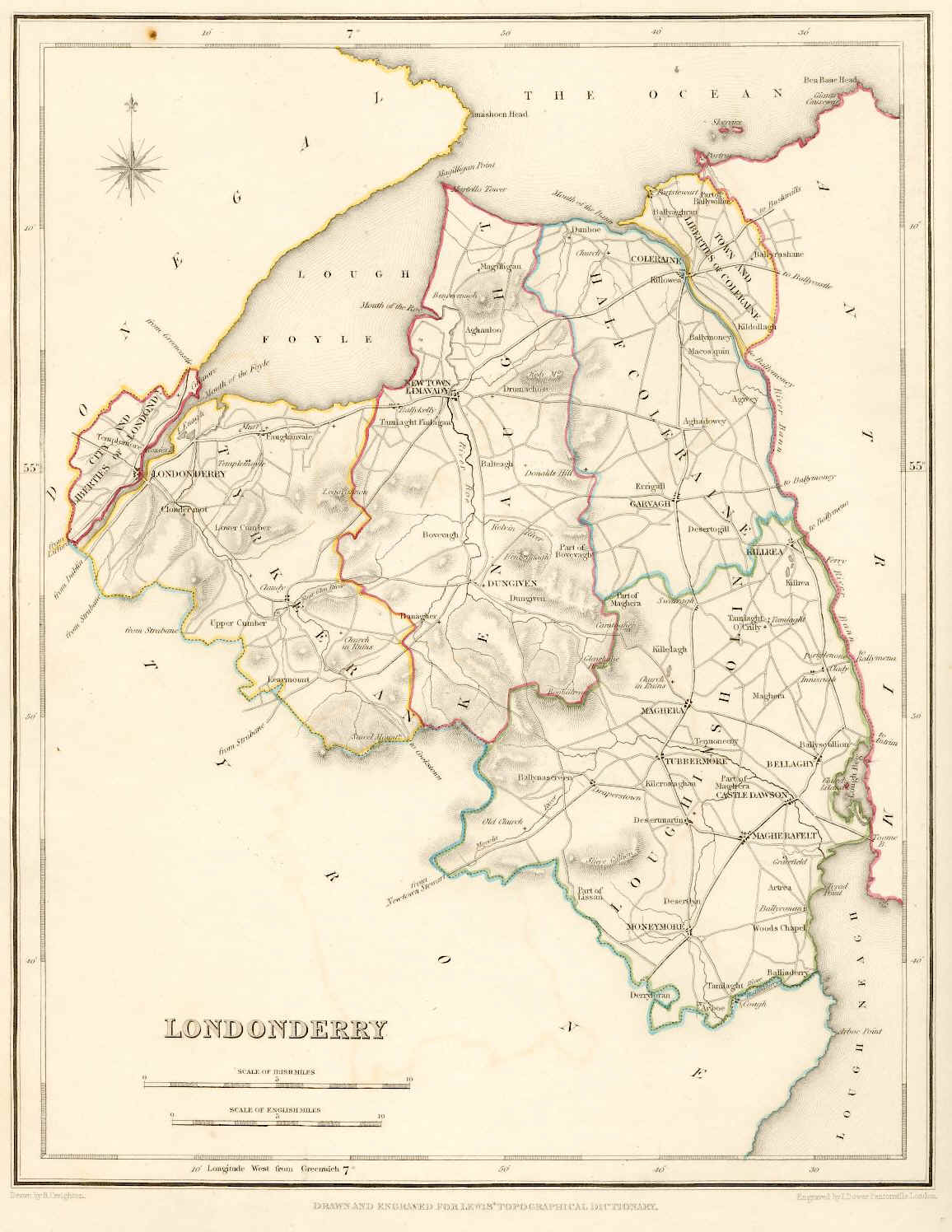
Map of County Londonderry, 1837

=== Prehistoric ===
The county has a significant of megalithic structures from prehistoric times, including Ballygroll Prehistoric Landscape, as well as numerous others. The most significant site however is Mountsandel, located near Coleraine in County Londonderry is "perhaps the oldest recorded settlement within Ireland".

=== County Coleraine and the Plantation of Ulster ===
At an early period, what became the county of Coleraine was inhabited by the O'Cahans, who were tributary to the O'Neills. Towards the close of the reign of Elizabeth I their territory was seized by England, with the purpose of checking the power of the O'Neills, and was made the county of Coleraine, named after the regional capital.

A short description of County Coleraine is given in Harris's Hibernica, and also in Captain Pynnar's Survey of the Escheated Counties of Ulster, Anno 1618:

The county of Coleraine,* otherwise called O'Cahan's country, is divided, as Tyrone, by ballyboes and doth contain, as appeareth by the survey, 547 ballyboes, or 34,187 acres, every ballyboe containing 60 acres or thereabouts.

On 2 March 1613, James I granted a charter to The Honourable The Irish Society to undertake the plantation of a new county. This county was named Londonderry, a combination of London (in reference to the Livery Companies of the Irish Society) and Derry (then name of the city). This charter declared that the "City of Londonderry" and everything contained within the new county:

shall be united, consolidated, and from hence-forth for ever be one entire County of itself, distinct and separate from all our Counties whatsoever within our Kingdom of Ireland-and from henceforth for ever be named, accounted and called, the County of Londonderry.

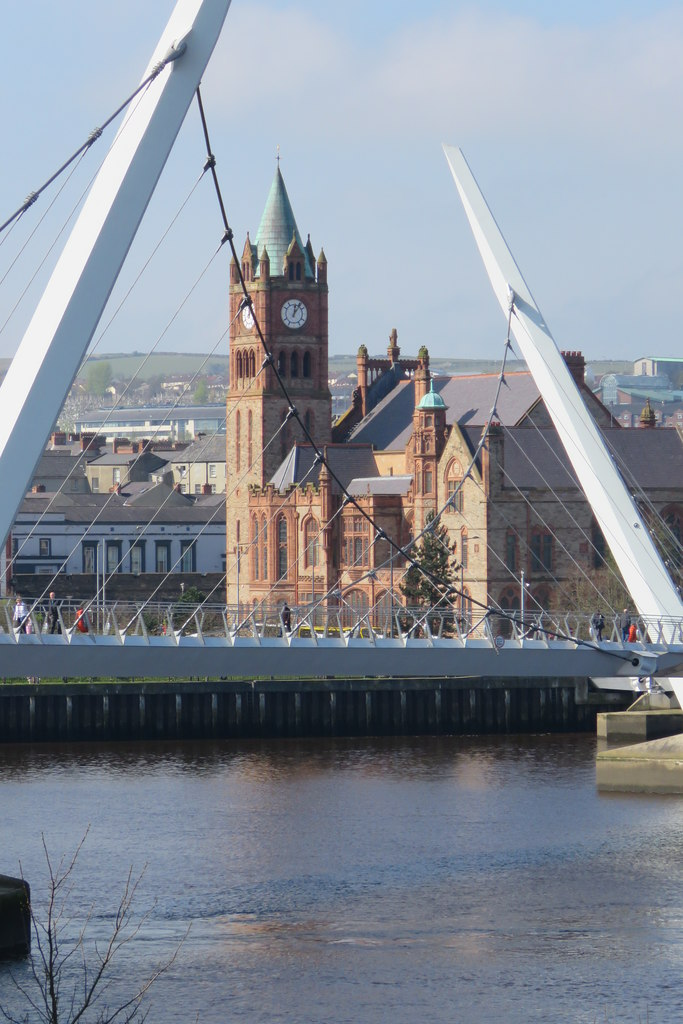
Derry, the largest city in County Londonderry

This new county would comprise the then County Coleraine—which consisted of the baronies of Tirkeeran, Coleraine, and Keenaght—and at the behest of The Irish Society the following additional territory was added: all but the south-west corner of the barony of Loughinsholin, then a part of County Tyrone, as it had sufficient wood for construction; the North East Liberties of Coleraine, which was part of County Antrim and the City of Londonderry and its Liberties, which were in County Donegal, so that they could control both banks of the River Foyle and River Bann.

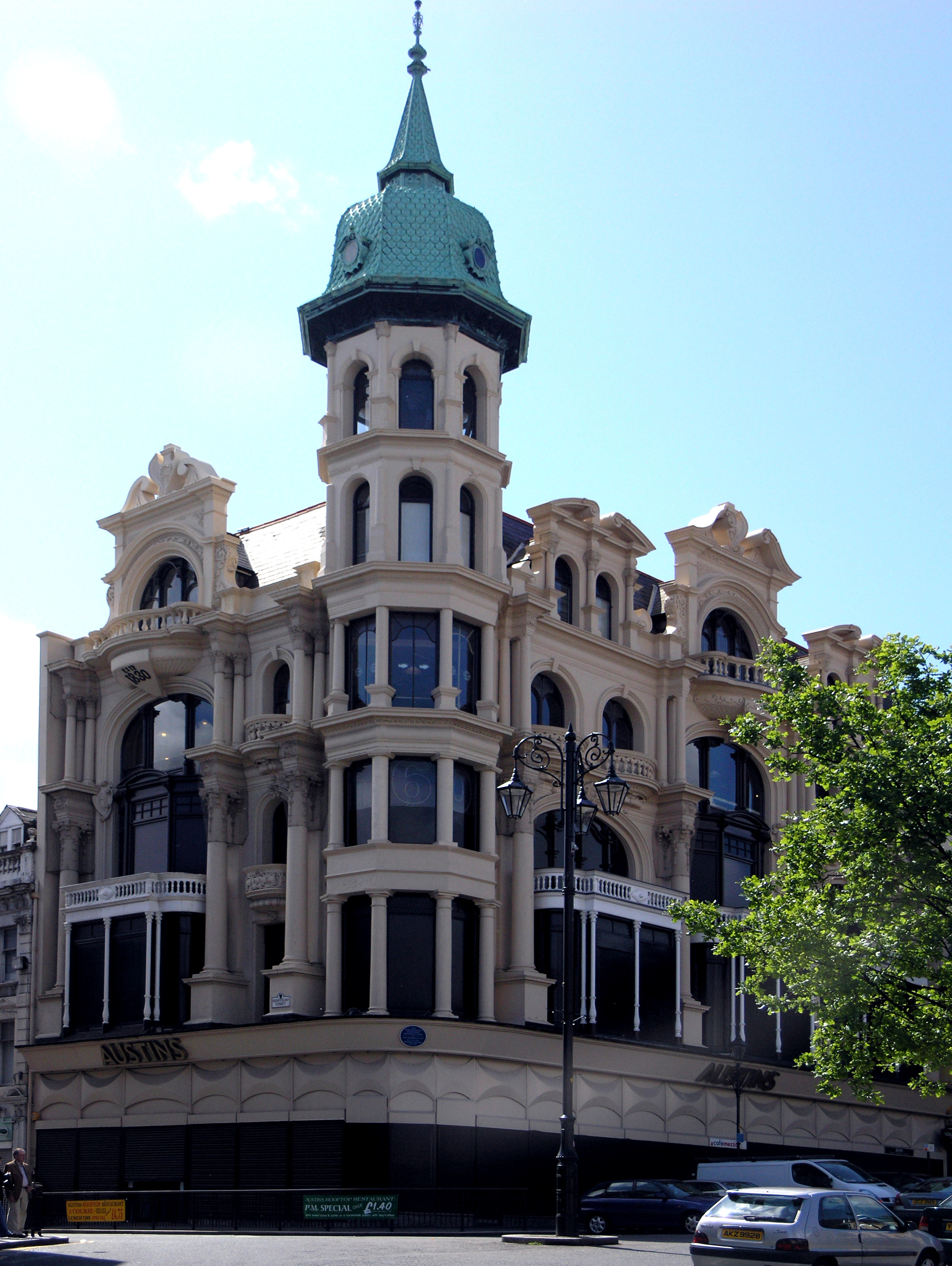
Austins, Derry, formerly the world's oldest independent department store.

The Irish Society was made up of the twelve main livery companies of London, which themselves were composed of various guilds. Whilst The Irish Society as a whole was given possession of the city of Londonderry, and Coleraine, the individual companies were each granted an estimated 3,210 acres (5.02 sq mi; 13.0 km^{2}) throughout the county. These companies and the sites of their headquarters were:

- Clothworkers, based at Killowen and Clothworker's Hall (present-day Articlave) in the barony of Coleraine;
- Drapers, based at Draper's Hall, later called Drapers Town (present-day Moneymore) in the barony of Loughinsholin;
- Fishmongers, based at Artikelly and Fishermonger's Hall (present-day Ballykelly) in the barony of Keenaght;
- Goldsmiths, based at Goldsmith's Hall (present-day Newbuildings) in the barony of Tirkeeran;
- Grocers, based at Grocer's Hall, alias Muff (present-day Eglinton) in the barony of Tirkeeran;
- Haberdashers, based at Habberdasher's Hall (present-day Ballycastle) in the barony of Keenaght;
- Ironmongers, based at Ironmonger's Hall (present-day townland of Agivey) in the barony of Coleraine;
- Mercers, based at Mercer's Hall (present-day townland of Movanagher) in the barony of Coleraine;
- Merchant Taylors, based at Merchant Taylor's Hall (present-day Macosquin) in the barony of Coleraine;
- Salters, based at Salter's Hall (present-day Magherafelt) and Salters Town in the barony of Loughinsholin;
- Skinners, based at Skinner's Hall (present-day Dungiven) in the barony of Keenaght;
- Vintners, based at Vintner's Hall, later called Vintner's Town (present-day Bellaghy) in the barony of Loughinsholin.

=== 19th century ===
As a result of the Local Government (Ireland) Act 1898, the city was detached from the county for administrative purposes, becoming a separate county borough from 1899. The county town of County Londonderry, and seat of the Londonderry County Council until its abolition in 1973, was therefore moved to the town of Coleraine.

Historical population
Year	Pop.	±%
1653	6,102	—
1659	7,102	+16.4%
1821	193,869	+2629.8%
1831	222,012	+14.5%
1841	222,174	+0.1%
1851	192,022	−13.6%
1861	184,209	−4.1%
1871	173,906	−5.6%
1881	164,991	−5.1%
1891	152,009	−7.9%
1901	144,404	−5.0%
1911	140,625	−2.6%
1926	139,693	−0.7%
1937	142,736	+2.2%
1951	155,540	+9.0%
1961	165,298	+6.3%
1966	174,658	+5.7%
1971	183,094	+4.8%
1981	197,278	+7.7%
1991	213,035	+8.0%
2001	235,864	+10.7%
2011	247,132	+4.8%
2021	252,231	+2.1%

== Geography and places of interest ==
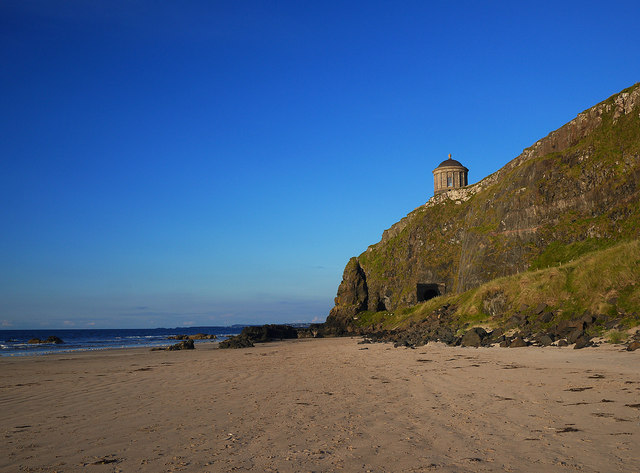
Downhill Strand.

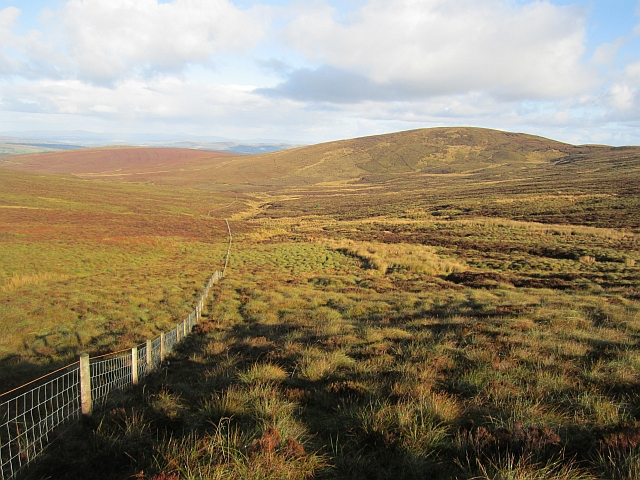
Sperrin Mountains

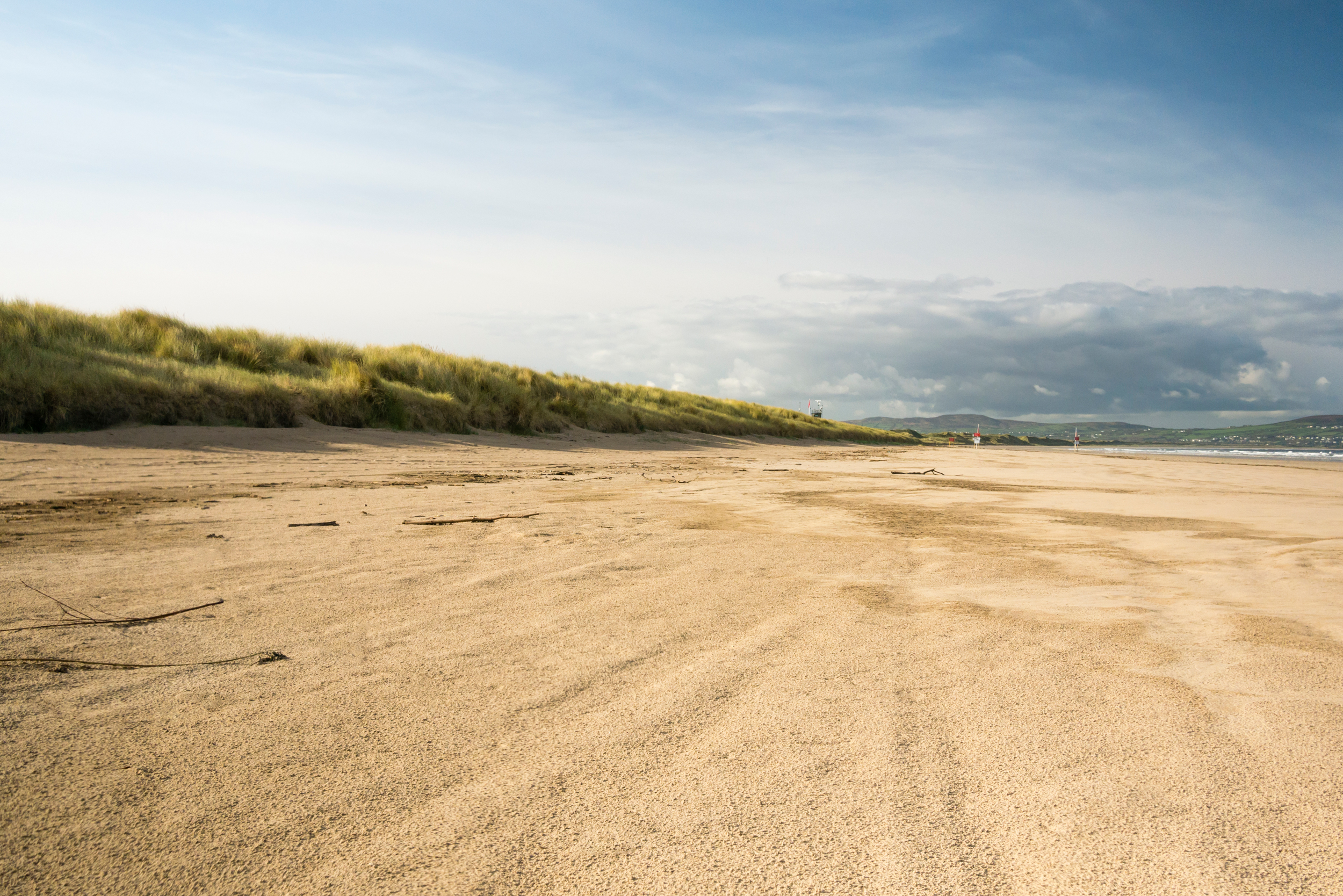
Benone Strand

The highest point in the county is the summit of Sawel Mountain (678 metres (2,224 ft)) on the border with County Tyrone. Sawel is part of the Sperrin Mountains, which dominate the southern part of the county. To the east and west, the land falls into the valleys of the Bann and Foyle rivers respectively; in the south-east, the county touches the shore of Lough Neagh, which is the largest lake in Ireland; the north of the county is distinguished by the steep cliffs, dune systems, and remarkable beaches of the Atlantic coast.

The county is home to a number of important buildings and landscapes, including the well-preserved 17th-century city walls of Derry; the National Trust–owned Plantation estate at Springhill; Mussenden Temple on the Atlantic coast; the dikes, artificial coastlines and the bird sanctuaries on the eastern shore of Lough Foyle; and the visitor centre at Bellaghy Bawn, close to the childhood home of Nobel laureate Seamus Heaney. In the centre of the county are the old-growth deciduous forests at Banagher and Ness Wood, where the Burntollet River flows over the highest waterfalls in Northern Ireland.

=== Subdivisions ===
Baronies

- Coleraine
- Keenaght
- North East Liberties of Coleraine
- North West Liberties of Londonderry
- Loughinsholin
- Tirkeeran

Parishes

Townlands

=== Settlements ===
Cities

(population of 75,000 or more with a cathedral)

- Derry

Large towns

(population of 18,000 or more and under 75,000 at 2001 Census)

- Coleraine

Medium towns

(population of 10,000 or more and under 18,000 at 2001 Census)

- Limavady

Small towns

(population of 4,500 or more and under 10,000 at 2001 Census)

- Maghera
- Magherafelt
- Portstewart

Intermediate settlements

(population of 2,250 or more and under 4,500 at 2001 Census)

- Culmore (part of Derry Urban Area)
- Dungiven
- Eglinton
- Newbuildings (part of Derry Urban Area)

Villages

(population of 1,000 or more and under 2,250 at 2001 Census)

- Ballykelly
- Bellaghy
- Castledawson
- Castlerock
- Claudy
- Draperstown
- Garvagh
- Greysteel
- Kilrea
- Moneymore
- Strathfoyle (part of Derry Urban Area)

Small villages or hamlets

(population of less than 1,000 at 2001 Census)

- Articlave
- Ballerin
- Ballymaguigan
- Ballyronan
- Clady
- Culnady
- Desertmartin
- Downhill
- Drumsurn
- Feeny
- Glenullin
- Gulladuff
- Lettershendoney
- Macosquin
- Ringsend
- Swatragh
- Tobermore
- Upperlands

== Demography ==
Religious Background in Londonderry (2021)
Religion	Per cent
Catholic	61.3%
Protestant and Other Christian	32.5%
None	5.3%
Other faiths	0.9%

It is one of four counties in Northern Ireland which currently has a majority of the population from a Catholic community background, according to the 2021 census. At the time of the 2021 census there were 252,231 residents of County Londonderry. Of these: 61.3% were from a Catholic background, 32.5% were from a Protestant and Other Christian (including Christian related), 0.9% were from other religions, and 5.3% had no religious background.

Religion or religion brought up in (2021 Census)
Religion or religion brought up in	Number	%
Catholic	154,621	61.3%
Protestant and Other Christian	81,995	32.5%
Other religions	2,368	0.9%
None (no religion)	13,247	5.3%
Total	252,231	100.00%

National identity (2021 Census)
National identity	Number	(%)
Irish only	106,343	42.2%
British only	62,562	24.8%
Northern Irish only	49,764	19.7%
British and Northern Irish only	13,148	5.2%
Irish and Northern Irish only	5,072	2.0%
British, Irish and Northern Irish only	2,475	1.0%
British and Irish only	1,388	0.6%
Other identity	11,477	4.6%
Total	252,231	100.0%
All Irish identities	116,032	46.0%
All British identities	81,097	32.2%
All Northern Irish identities	21,248	10.9%

== Administration ==
The county was administered by Londonderry County Council from 1899 until the abolition of county councils in Northern Ireland in 1973. They were replaced by district councils. These councils were: Londonderry City Council (renamed Derry City Council in 1984), Limavady Borough Council, and Magherafelt District Council, most of Coleraine Borough Council, and part of Cookstown District Council. After a reduction in the number of councils in Northern Ireland in 2011, County Londonderry is divided into three cross-county councils: Causeway Coast and Glens, Derry and Strabane, and Mid-Ulster District.

== Transport ==
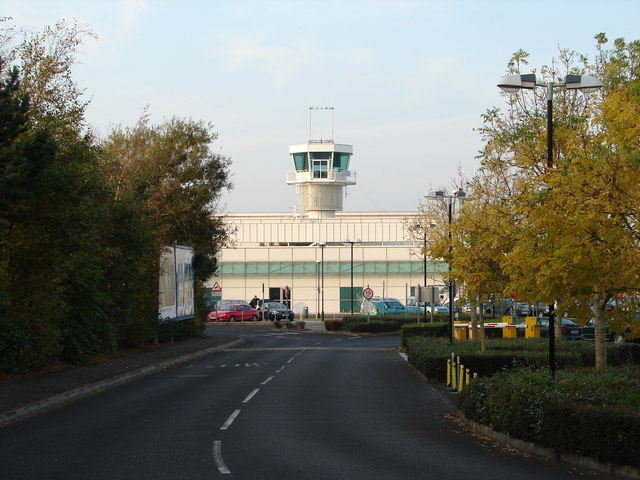
City of Derry Airport

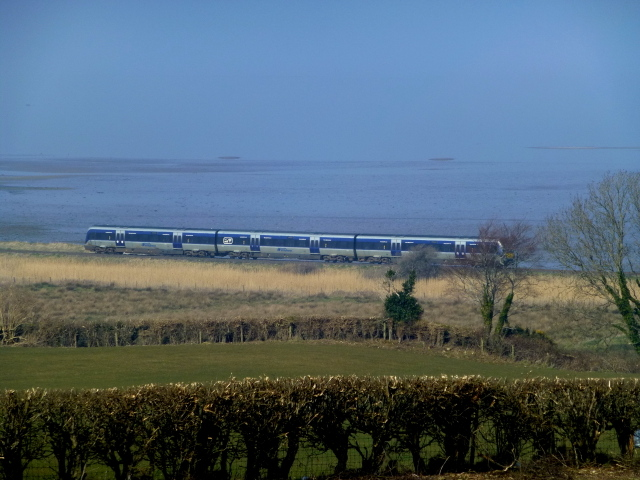
NI Railways train along Lough Foyle

=== Airports ===
The county is served by City of Derry airport, located 7mi to the north of Derry, near Eglinton. The airport is served by regular flights to Birmingham, Dublin, Edinburgh, Glasgow, London-Heathrow, Liverpool and Manchester, with occasional charter services to continental Europe. The airport is currently served by easyJet, Loganair and Ryanair.

Rail

Translink Northern Ireland Railways provide all railway services in the county, linking Derry~Londonderry, Bellarena, Castlerock and Coleraine to Belfast Grand Central, this service operates hourly on the Belfast-Derry railway line. A line also diverges from Coleraine, connecting Portrush, County Antrim on the Coleraine-Portrush railway line which also serves University, this service also operates hourly.

There is also the Foyle Valley Railway, a museum in Derry with some rolling stock from both the County Donegal Railway and the Londonderry and Lough Swilly Railway, and is located on the site of the former Londonderry Foyle Road railway station. The Londonderry and Lough Swilly Railway continued as a private bus company based in the city but operating predominantly in County Donegal until it closed in 2014. Bus services are now provided by Ulsterbus.

Sea

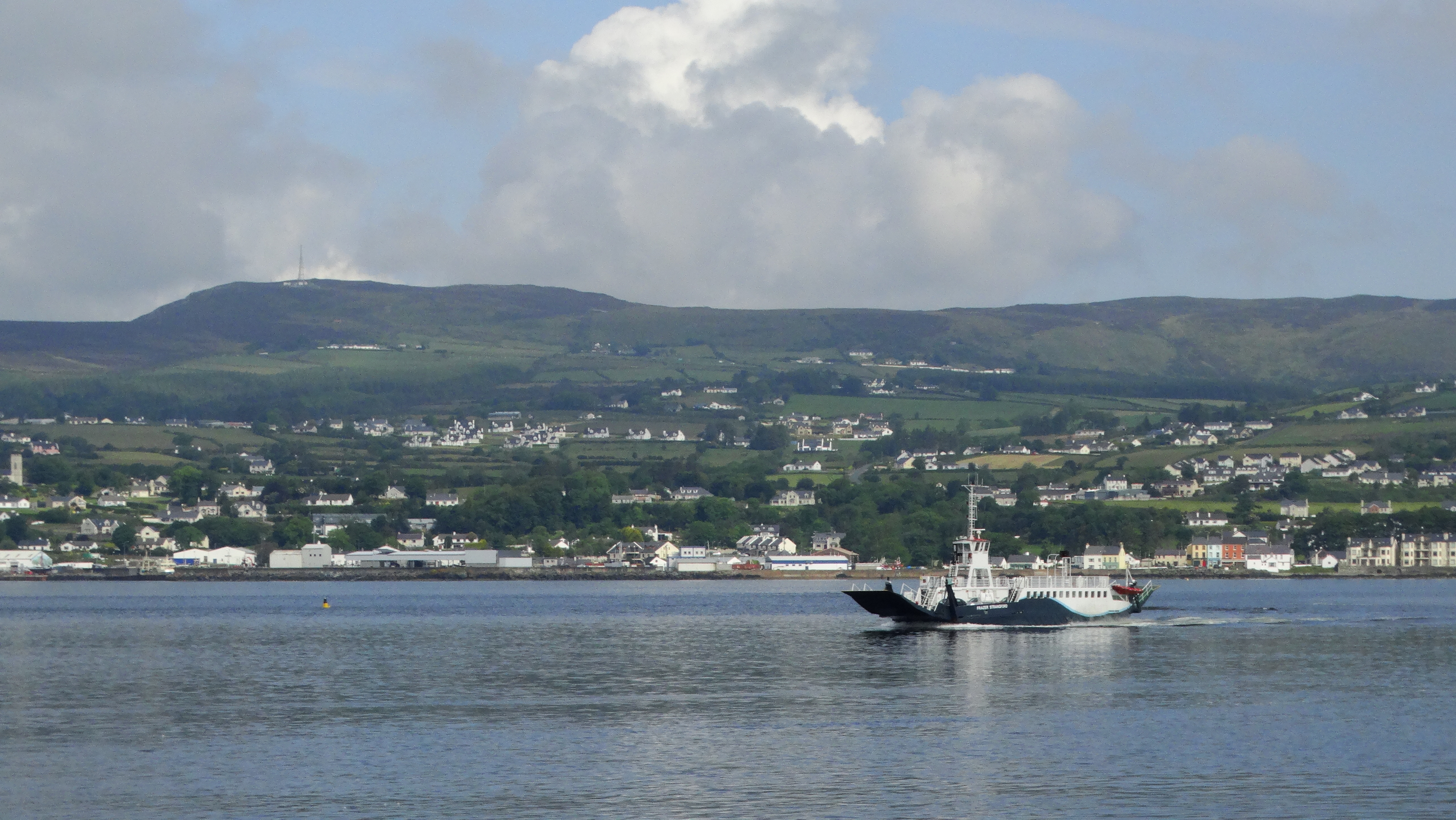
Lough Foyle Ferry approaching Magilligan Point

The county is served by Londonderry Port, now operating as Foyle Port, located on Lough Foyle at Lisahally. It is the United Kingdom's most westerly port. The main port for the city of Derry, it used to be located in the city centre, however it relocated to Lisahally in 1993. The port is used by DuPont to import raw materials for their manufacturing process and by the nearby Coolkeeragh power station to import fuel oil for their turbines. Lisahally Terminal has 440 metres (1,440 ft) of quay and can facilitate vessels up to 62,000 GT. Primarily a bulk port and major importer of oil, coal, animal feed, fertiliser and plywood. The port also accepts cruise ships at the city centre berths and at its commercial port at Lisahally.

The county also has a regular ferry service, the Lough Foyle Ferry, providing a seasonal daily shuttle service between Magilligan Point, County Londonderry and Greencastle, County Donegal. The ferry typically operates throughout the spring and summer season.

== Education ==
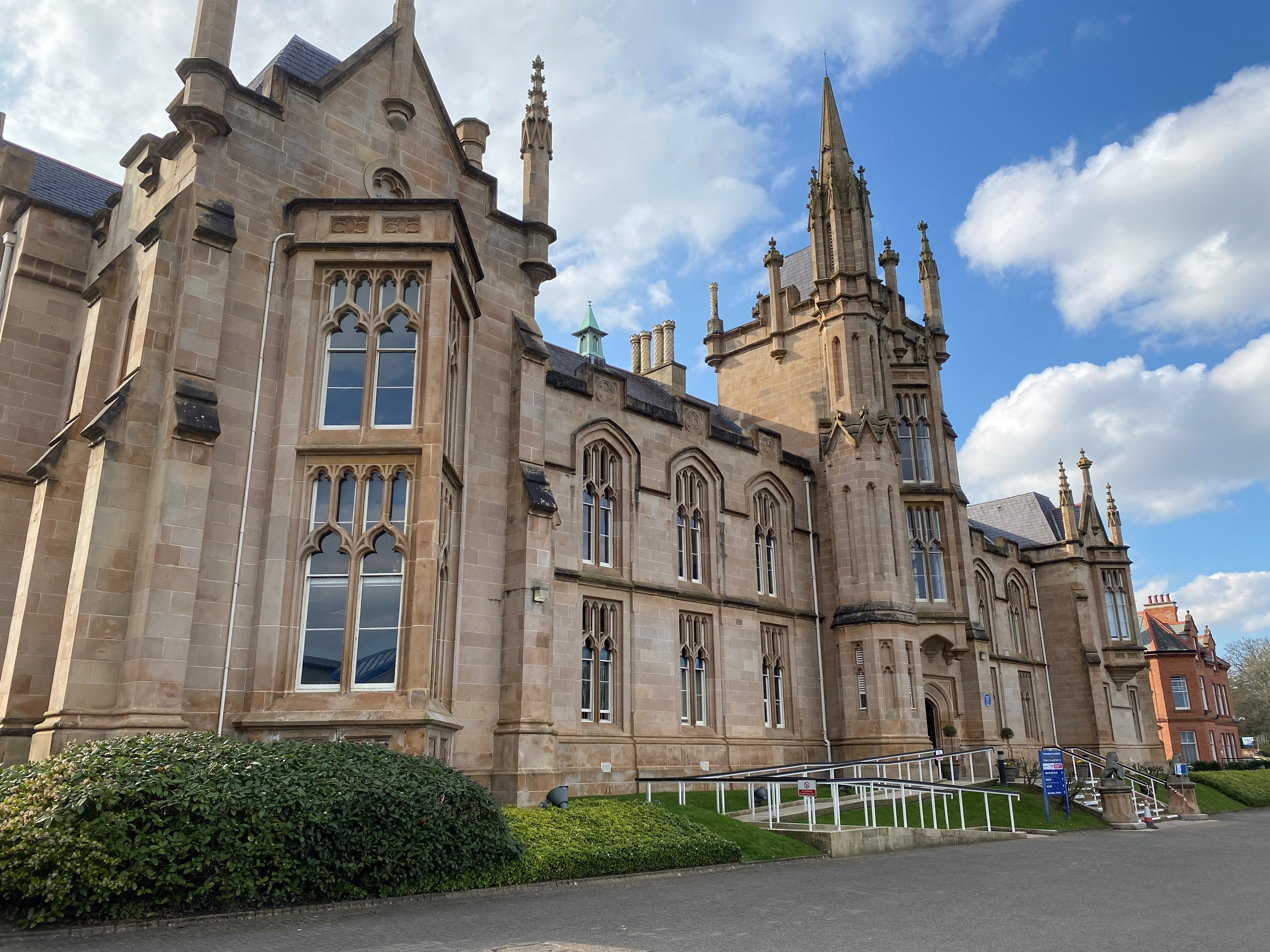
Ulster University, Magee

Government-funded education up to secondary school level is administered by the Education Authority (EA), sponsored by the Department of Education. The EA is divided into sub-regions:

- Western region: Derry, Limavady;
- North Eastern region: Coleraine, Magherafelt;
- Southern region: Cookstown.

For Catholic grant-maintained schools administration is by the Derry Diocesan Education Office.

Two major centres of the University of Ulster are in the county, including its headquarters at Coleraine and the Magee Campus in Derry.

== Sport ==
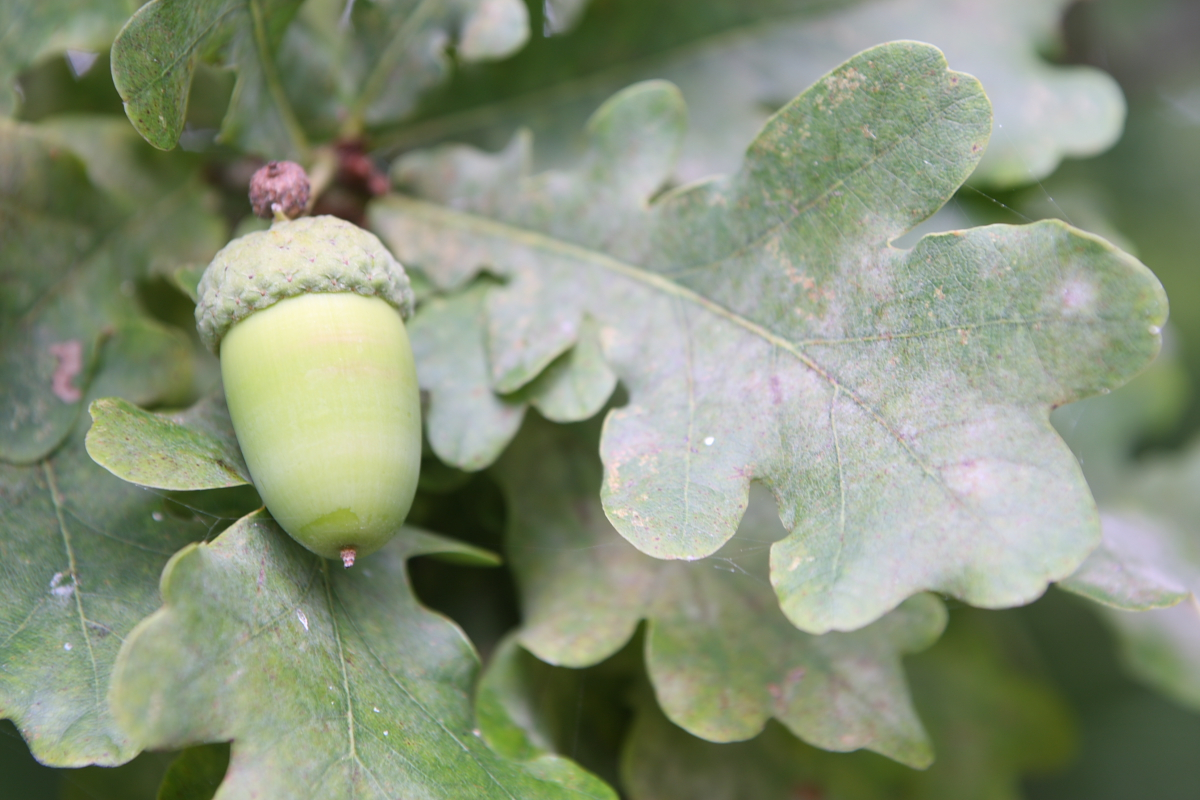
The oak leaf which represents the county's nickname.

In Gaelic games, the GAA county of Derry is more or less coterminous with the former administrative county of Londonderry, although teams from the neighbouring counties of Tyrone, Donegal and Antrim have occasionally played in Derry competitions, and vice versa. The Derry teams wear the colours red and white. There are many club teams competing in up to five leagues and three championships. The county team has won one All-Ireland Senior Football Championship (in 1993) and five National League titles. Hurling is also widely played but is not as popular as football. However, the county team is generally regarded as one of the top hurling sides in Ulster and in 2006 won the Nicky Rackard Cup – the third tier hurling competition in Ireland.

In association football, the NIFL Premiership, which operates as the top division, has two teams in the county: Coleraine F.C. and Institute F.C., with Limavady United F.C., Moyola Park F.C., Portstewart F.C. and Tobermore United F.C. competing in the NIFL Championship, which operates as levels two and three. Derry City F.C. play in the Premier Division of the League of Ireland after leaving the Northern Ireland structures in 1985, having resigned from the Irish Football League at the height of the Troubles because of not being allowed play their home games at the Brandywell due to security concerns from other clubs.

The Northern Ireland Milk Cup was established in 1983 and is regarded as one of the most prestigious youth football tournaments in Europe and the world. The competition is based at Coleraine and involves several other towns and villages in the county – Limavady, Portstewart and Castlerock – and in neighbouring County Antrim – Ballymoney, Portrush, Ballymena and Broughshane. The event, held in the last week of July, has attracted teams from 56 countries around the world including Europe, the US, Africa, the Far East, South America, the Middle East, Australia, Russia, New Zealand and Canada. Some of the biggest teams in the world have entered including English clubs Everton, Liverpool, Manchester United, Chelsea, Tottenham Hotspur as well as top European teams such as Feyenoord, F.C. Porto, FC Barcelona, Benfica, Bayern Munich and Dynamo Kiev.

In rugby union, the county is represented at senior level by Rainey RFC, based in Magherafelt, who compete in the Ulster Senior League and All-Ireland League. Limavady R.F.C, City of Derry Rugby Club, Londonderry Y.M.C.A and Coleraine Rugby Club all compete in Ulster Qualifying League One.

Cricket is popular in the north-west of Ireland, with 11 of the 20 senior clubs in the North West Cricket Union located in County Londonderry: Limavady, Eglinton, Glendermott, Brigade, Killymallaght, Ardmore, Coleraine, Bonds Glen, Drummond, Creevedonnell and The Nedd.

In rowing, Richard Archibald from Coleraine along with his Irish teammates qualified for the Beijing 2008 Olympics by finishing second in the lightweight fours final in Poznań, thus qualifying for the Beijing 2008 Olympics. Another Coleraine rower Alan Campbell is a World Cup gold medallist in the single sculls in 2006.

== Media ==
The county currently has four main radio stations:

- BBC Radio Foyle;
- Q102.9;
- Q97.2;
- Six FM (in the south of the county)

== See also ==
- Abbeys and priories in Northern Ireland (County Londonderry)
- List of archaeological sites in County Londonderry
- List of places in County Londonderry
- List of townlands in County Londonderry
- List of civil parishes of County Londonderry
- Lord Lieutenant of County Londonderry
- High Sheriff of County Londonderry
