= The Beautiful South discography =

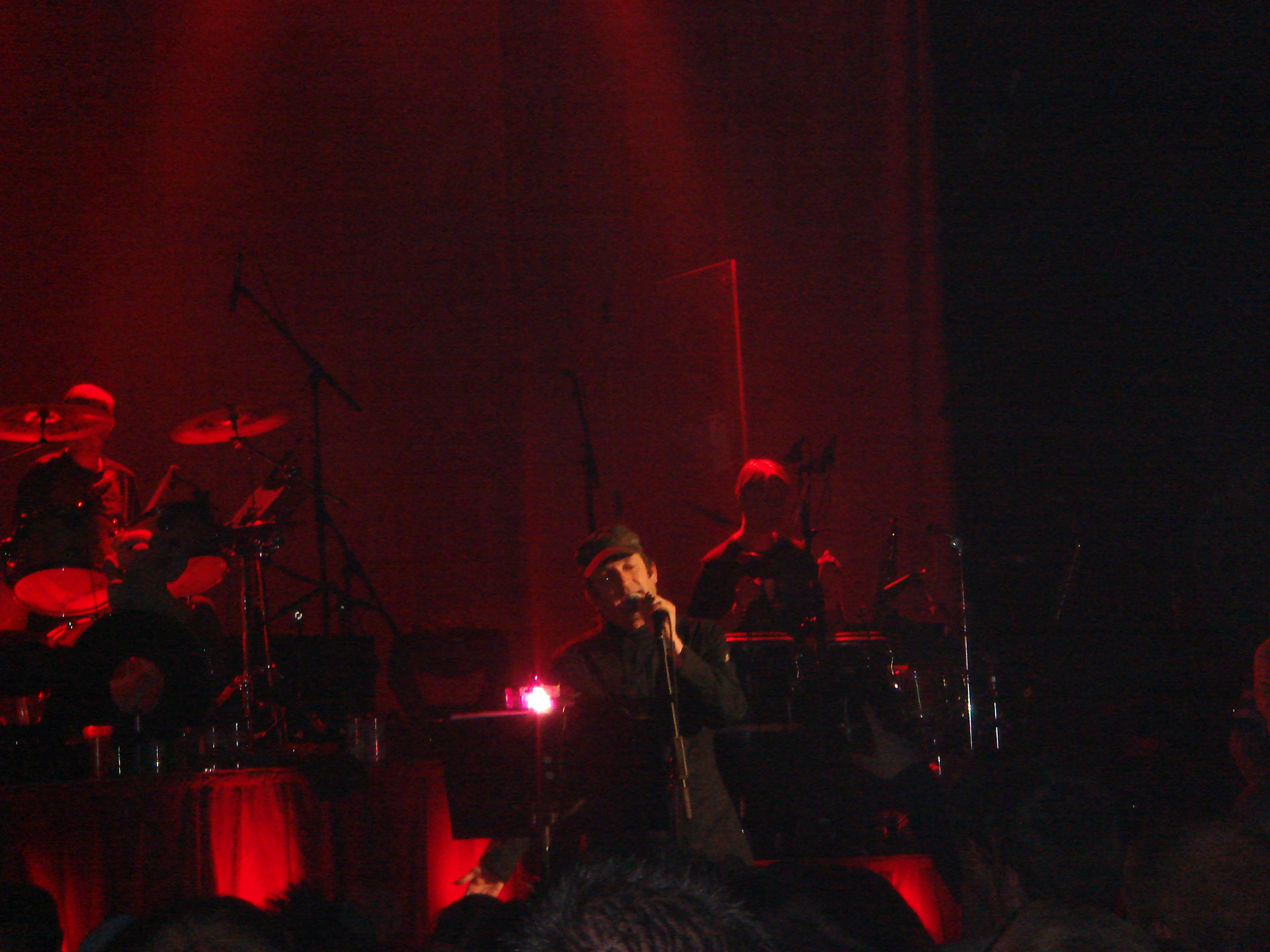
- The Beautiful South in concert
- Studio albums: 10
- Compilation albums: 6
- Singles: 34

The discography of The Beautiful South, an English pop/rock group, consists of ten studio albums, five greatest-hits compilations, thirty-four singles and a number of other releases.

== Albums ==
=== Studio albums ===
Year	Details	Peak chart positions										Certifications (sales thresholds)
Year	Details	UK	AUS	BEL (Fl)	CAN	FRA	GER	IRL	NZL	SWE	SWI	Certifications (sales thresholds)
1989	Welcome to the Beautiful South: Released: October 1989; Label: Go! Discs (#); Formats: CD, cassette, LP	2	—	—	36	39	16	—	—	—	—	BPI: Platinum
1990	Choke: Released: October 1990; Label: Go! Discs (#); Formats: CD, cassette, LP	2	69	—	—	—	30	—	46	—	—	BPI: Platinum
1992	0898 Beautiful South: Released: March 1992; Label: Go! Discs (#); Formats: CD, cassette, LP	4	—	—	47	—	40	—	—	—	—	BPI: Gold
1994	Miaow: Released: March 1994; Label: Go! Discs (#); Formats: CD, cassette, LP	6	—	—	—	—	70	—	—	—	—	BPI: Gold
1996	Blue Is the Colour: Released: October 1996; Label: Go! Discs (#); Formats: CD, cassette, LP	1	—	10	—	—	—	—	49	—	—	BPI: 5× Platinum; IFPI: Platinum
1998	Quench: Released: October 1998; Label: Go! Discs (#); Formats: CD, cassette, LP	1	—	—	—	—	26	65	—	58	28	BPI: 3× Platinum; IFPI: Platinum
2000	Painting It Red: Released: 9 October 2000; Label: Ark 21 (#); Formats: CD, cassette, LP	2	—	—	—	—	37	13	—	—	—	BPI: Gold
2003	Gaze: Released: 27 October 2003; Label: Go! Discs (#); Formats: CD, cassette, LP	14	—	—	—	—	—	—	—	—	—	BPI: Silver
2004	Golddiggas, Headnodders and Pholk Songs: Released: 25 October 2004; Label: Sony (#); Formats: CD, cassette, LP	11	—	—	—	—	—	4	—	—	—	BPI: Gold
2006	Superbi: Released: 15 May 2006; Label: Sony (#); Formats: CD, cassette, LP	6	—	—	—	—	—	17	—	—	—	BPI: Silver

=== Compilation albums ===
Year	Details	Peak chart positions				Certifications (sales thresholds)
Year	Details	UK	CAN	GER	IRL	Certifications (sales thresholds)
1994	Carry On Up the Charts: Released: November 1994; Label: Go! Discs (#); Formats: CD, cassette, LP	1	50	53	—	BPI: 6× Platinum; IFPI: 2× Platinum
2001	Solid Bronze: Released: November 2001; Label: Polygram (#); Formats: CD, cassette, LP	10	—	77	20	BPI: 2× Platinum
2006	Gold: Released: 4 April 2006; Label: Go! Discs (#); Formats: CD, cassette, LP	139	—	—	81	BPI: Silver
2007	The BBC Sessions: Released: 19 March 2007; Label: Universal Distribution (#); Formats: CD, cassette, LP	165	—	—	—	
2007	Soup: Released: 12 November 2007; Label: Mercury (#); Formats: CD, cassette, LP	15	—	—	65	BPI: Platinum
2011	Live at the BBC: Released: 2 May 2011; Label: Commercial (#); Formats: CD, CD & DVD, digital download	—	—	—	—	

== Singles ==
Year	Single	Peak chart positions										Certifications	Album
Year	Single	UK	AUS	AUT	BEL (Fl)	CAN	GER	IRL	NLD	SWI	US Alt	Certifications	Album
1989	"Song for Whoever"	2	145	30	22	81	21	5	22	—	—	BPI: Gold	Welcome to the Beautiful South
1989	"You Keep It All In"	8	155	—	—	—	37	3	—	—	19	BPI: Silver	Welcome to the Beautiful South
1989	"I'll Sail This Ship Alone"	31	—	—	—	—	74	19	—	—	—		Welcome to the Beautiful South
1990	"A Little Time"	1	72	20	17	—	47	2	18	—	—	BPI: Gold	Choke
1990	"My Book"	43	172	—	—	—	—	25	—	—	—		Choke
1990	"I've Come for My Award"	—	—	—	—	—	—	—	—	—	—	Promotional single	Choke
1991	"Let Love Speak Up Itself"	51	—	—	—	—	—	—	—	—	—		Choke
1991	"What You See Is What You Get"	—	—	—	—	—	—	—	—	—	—	Promotional single	Choke
1991	"Old Red Eyes Is Back"	22	—	—	—	—	51	21	—	—	—		0898 Beautiful South
1992	"We Are Each Other"	30	—	—	—	—	81	—	—	—	10		0898 Beautiful South
1992	"Bell Bottomed Tear"	16	—	—	—	—	—	—	—	—	—		0898 Beautiful South
1992	"36D"	46	—	—	—	—	—	—	—	—	—		0898 Beautiful South
1994	"Good as Gold (Stupid as Mud)"	23	—	—	—	—	54	—	—	—	—		Miaow
1994	"Everybody's Talkin'"	12	—	—	—	—	—	23	—	—	—		Miaow
1994	"Prettiest Eyes"	37	—	—	—	—	—	—	—	—	—		Miaow
1994	"One Last Love Song"	14	—	—	—	—	—	—	—	—	—		Carry On Up the Charts
1995	"Dream a Little Dream"	—	—	—	—	—	—	—	—	29	—		non-album singles
1995	"Pretenders to the Throne"	18	—	—	—	—	—	—	—	—	—		non-album singles
1996	"Rotterdam (Or Anywhere)"	5	—	—	—	—	72	11	—	—	—	BPI: Platinum	Blue Is the Colour
1996	"Little Blue"	—	—	—	—	—	—	—	—	—	—	Promotional single	Blue Is the Colour
1996	"Don't Marry Her"	8	—	—	50	—	89	11	—	—	—	BPI: Platinum	Blue Is the Colour
1997	"Blackbird on the Wire"	23	—	—	—	—	—	—	—	—	—		Blue Is the Colour
1997	"Liars' Bar"	43	—	—	—	—	—	—	—	—	—		Blue Is the Colour
1998	"Perfect 10"	2	—	—	—	—	64	6	—	47	—	BPI: Platinum	Quench
1998	"Dumb"	16	—	—	—	—	—	—	—	—	—		Quench
1999	"How Long's a Tear Take to Dry?"	12	—	—	—	—	—	—	—	—	—		Quench
1999	"The Table" (featuring The London Community Gospel Choir)	46	—	—	—	—	—	—	—	—	—		Quench
2000	"Closer than Most"	22	—	—	—	—	—	—	—	—	—		Painting It Red
2001	"The River" / "Just Checkin'" (Double A-side)	59	—	—	—	—	—	—	—	—	—		Painting It Red
2001	"The Root of All Evil"	50	—	—	—	—	—	—	—	—	—		Solid Bronze
2003	"Just a Few Things That I Ain't"	30	—	—	—	—	—	—	—	—	—		Gaze
2003	"Let Go with the Flow"	47	—	—	—	—	—	—	—	—	—		Gaze
2004	"Livin' Thing"	24	—	—	—	—	—	26	—	—	—		Golddiggas, Headnodders and Pholk Songs
2004	"This Old Skin" (featuring Chip Taylor)	43	—	—	—	—	—	—	—	—	—		Golddiggas, Headnodders and Pholk Songs
2005	"This Will Be Our Year"	36	—	—	—	—	—	28	—	—	—		Golddiggas, Headnodders and Pholk Songs
2005	"Stone in Love with You"	—	—	—	—	—	—	—	—	—	—	Ireland-only promotional single	Golddiggas, Headnodders and Pholk Songs
2006	"Manchester"	41	—	—	—	—	—	43	—	—	—		Superbi
2006	"The Rose of My Cologne"	99	—	—	—	—	—	—	—	—	—		Superbi
"—" indicates the single did not chart or was not released in given territory

== Music videos ==
Year	Single	Director	Album
1989	"Song For Whoever"	Jeff Baynes	Welcome to the Beautiful South
1989	"You Keep It All In"	Jeff Baynes	Welcome to the Beautiful South
1989	"I’ll Sail This Ship Alone"	Jeff Baynes	Welcome to the Beautiful South
1990	"A Little Time"	Nick Brandt	Choke
1990	"My Book"	Pedro Romhanyi	Choke
1991	"Let Love Speak Up Itself"	Pedro Romhanyi	Choke
1991	"Old Red Eyes Is Back"	Pedro Romhanyi	0898 Beautiful South
1992	"We Are Each Other"	Pedro Romhanyi	0898 Beautiful South
1992	"Bell Bottomed Tear"	Jeff Baynes	0898 Beautiful South
1992	"36D"	David Mould	0898 Beautiful South
1994	"Good as Gold"	Tim Pope	Miaow
1994	"Everybody’s Talkin"	Willy Smax	Miaow
1994	"Prettiest Eyes"	Liam & Grant	Miaow
1994	"One Last Love Song"	Liam & Grant	Carry On Up the Charts
1995	"Dream a Little Dream"	Pedro Romhanyi	non-album singles
1995	"Pretenders to the Throne"	Liam & Grant	non-album singles
1996	"Rotterdam"	Liam & Grant	Blue Is the Colour
1996	"Don’t Marry Her"	Liam & Grant	Blue Is the Colour
1997	"Blackbird on the Wire"	Pedro Romhanyi	Blue Is the Colour
1997	"Liars' Bar"	Liam & Grant	Blue Is the Colour
1998	"Perfect 10"	Liam & Grant	Quench
1998	"Dumb"	Liam & Grant	Quench
1999	"How Long’s a Tear Take to Dry?"	Liam & Grant	Quench
1999	"The Table"	Liam & Grant	Quench
2000	"Closer Than Most"	Liam & Grant	Painting It Red
2003	"Just a Few Things That I Ain’t"	TBC	Gaze
2003	"Let’s Go with the Flow"	TBC	Gaze
2004	"Livin' Thing"	Sven Harding	Golddiggas, Headnodders and Pholk Songs
2004	"This Old Skin"	TBC	Golddiggas, Headnodders and Pholk Songs
2006	"Manchester"	Sara Dunlop	Superbi
