= Solid Bronze – Great Hits =

Solid Bronze

Greatest hits album by the Beautiful South
- Released: November 2001
- Genres: Alternative rock, Pop rock, jangle pop, Indie rock, Jazz, Country
- Label: Mercury Records/Go! Discs

The Beautiful South chronology
Painting It Red (2000)	Solid Bronze (2001)	Gaze (2003)

Singles from Solid Bronze
- 1. "The Root of All Evil" Released: November 2001

Professional ratings
Review scores
Source	Rating
AllMusic	2.5/5 stars

Solid Bronze: Great Hits is the Beautiful South's ninth album and second greatest hits compilation. It was released in November 2001 and contains 19 tracks. The album contains two songs ("Pretenders to the Throne" and "Dream a Little Dream") that were released between Carry on up the Charts and Blue Is the Colour, and never made it onto any album.

It produced one single, "The Root of All Evil", released the same month as the album, which reached number 50 in the UK Singles Chart. The album got to number 10. The name of the album parodies other compilation albums, e.g., "Solid Gold - Greatest Hits" by self-deprecating the popularity of the band.

== Track listing ==
All tracks are written by Dave Rotheray/Paul Heaton, except where noted.

No.	Title	Notes	Length
1.	"Rotterdam (or Anywhere)"	(Taken from the album Blue is the Colour)	3:38
2.	"Perfect 10"	(Taken from the album Quench)	3:39
3.	"You Keep It All In"	(Taken from the album Welcome to the Beautiful South)	2:54
4.	"Don't Marry Her [Single Version]"	(Taken from the album Blue is the Colour)	3:24
5.	"A Little Time"	(Taken from the album Choke)	2:59
6.	"Everybody's Talkin'" (Fred Neil)	(Taken from the album Miaow)	2:38
7.	"Good as Gold (Stupid as Mud)"	(Taken from the album Miaow)	3:49
8.	"Dream a Little Dream" (Fabian Andre, Gus Kahn, Wilbur Schwandt)	(Taken from the US version of the compilation Carry On up the Charts)	3:35
9.	"Song for Whoever [Single Edit]"	(Original taken from the album Welcome to the Beautiful South)	4:06
10.	"Old Red Eyes Is Back"	(Taken from the album 0898 Beautiful South)	3:35
11.	"The Root of All Evil" (Rotheray, Heaton, Shields, Slattery)	(New Song)	2:39
12.	"One Last Love Song"	(Taken from the compilation Carry On up the Charts)	3:33
13.	"Dumb"	(Taken from the album Quench)	3:47
14.	"How Long's a Tear Take to Dry? [Single Edit]"	(Original taken from the album Quench)	3:18
15.	"Blackbird on the Wire [Radio Edit]"	(Original taken from the album Blue is the Colour)	3:12
16.	"Closer Than Most"	(Taken from the album Painting It Red)	3:08
17.	"The River [Single Edit]"	(Original taken from the album Painting It Red)	4:12
18.	"Pretenders to the Throne"	(Non-Album single from 1995)	3:14
19.	"The Mediterranean [ Morcheeba Mix]"	(Original taken from the album Painting It Red)	3:42

== CD Single/CDEP B-Sides ==
As was their usual modus operandi, The Beautiful South included unreleased material on the B-sides of the singles taken from their albums. Three tracks on this compilation, all singles, had not previously appeared on a Beautiful South album in the UK.

from the "Dream A Little Dream" CD (only available on import in the UK in 1995 - the first two tracks also later appeared on "Don't Marry Her" CD2 in 1996)

- "Dream A Little Dream"
- "Les Yeux Ouverts"
- "Good As Gold (Stupid As Mud)"

from the "Pretenders To The Throne" CD (1995 non-album single)

- "Pretenders To The Throne"
- "Virgin"
- "A Long Day in the Field"

from "The Root of all Evil" CD1 Enhanced (2001 single released to promote the compilation)

- "The Root Of All Evil"
- "Free For All"
- "Perfect 10" (video)

from "The Root of all Evil" CD2 Enhanced (2001 single released to promote the compilation)

- "The Root Of All Evil"
- "Chicken Wings" (Original Version)
- "Rotterdam" (video)

== Personnel ==
- Paul Heaton - vocals
- Dave Hemingway - vocals
- Jacqui Abbott - vocals (except 3, 5 & 10)
- Briana Corrigan - vocals (3, 5 & 10)
- Dave Rotheray - guitar
- Sean Welch - bass
- Dave Stead - drums

== Charts ==
=== Weekly charts ===
Chart (2001)	Peak position
German Albums (Offizielle Top 100)	77
Irish Albums (IRMA)	20
Scottish Albums (Official Charts)	8
UK Albums (Official Charts)	10

=== Year-end charts ===
Chart (2001)	Position
UK Albums (OCC)	33
Chart (2002)	Position
UK Albums (OCC)	172

== Certifications and sales ==
Region	Certification	Certified units/sales
United Kingdom (BPI)	3× Platinum	940,694
