= Carry On Up the Charts =

Carry On Up the Charts: The Best of the Beautiful South

Greatest hits album by the Beautiful South
- Released: 7 November 1994
- Recorded: 1994
- Genres: Alternative rock, jangle pop, pop rock
- Length: 50:58
- Label: Go! Discs
- Producers: Mike Hedges; Jon Kelly; John Brough; The Magic Pumpkin

The Beautiful South chronology
Miaow (1994)	Carry On Up the Charts: The Best of the Beautiful South (1994)	Blue Is the Colour (1996)

Singles from Carry On Up the Charts: The Best of the Beautiful South
- 1. "One Last Love Song" Released: 24 October 1994

Professional ratings
Review scores
Source	Rating
AllMusic	4.5/5 stars
Christgau's Consumer Guide	A−
Q	4/5 stars
The Rolling Stone Album Guide	4.5/5 stars

Carry On Up the Charts: The Best of the Beautiful South is an album by English alternative rock band the Beautiful South. It is the group's fifth album and their first greatest hits collection. It was a major commercial success, reaching number one in the UK Albums Chart and going on to become the second-biggest-selling album of 1994.

== Release ==
Carry On Up the Charts was released in November 1994, the same year as the band's previous album Miaow, with its only single, "One Last Love Song", being released in October 1994 - only two months after "Prettiest Eyes", the last single to be taken from Miaow. "One Last Love Song" reached number 14 in the UK Singles Chart.

The album includes all of the single releases from the band's first five years in order of their release. Its title is a reference to the Carry On film series. A two-disc Limited Edition version was also released, with the bonus disc containing Non-LP/CD B-sides from the singles.

== Chart performance ==
Released at a time when the group's album sales had been waning, it proved to be a surprise success. The album reached no. 1 on the UK Albums Chart on 3 December 1994 and went on to become the second biggest selling album of 1994. By the summer of 1995 it was certified as 5× platinum in the UK. Such was the album's popularity, it was claimed that one in seven British households owned a copy.

== Track listing ==
All tracks are written by Dave Rotheray/Paul Heaton, except where noted.

Carry On Up the Charts track listing
No.	Title	Album	Length
1.	"Song for Whoever" (single edit)	Welcome to the Beautiful South	4:06
2.	"You Keep It All In"	Welcome to the Beautiful South	2:54
3.	"I'll Sail This Ship Alone"	Welcome to the Beautiful South	4:07
4.	"A Little Time"	Choke	3:00
5.	"My Book"	Choke	2:53
6.	"Let Love Speak Up Itself"	Choke	4:20
7.	"Old Red Eyes Is Back"	0898 Beautiful South	3:36
8.	"We Are Each Other"	0898 Beautiful South	3:37
9.	"Bell Bottomed Tear"	0898 Beautiful South	4:35
10.	"36D"	0898 Beautiful South	4:02
11.	"Good as Gold"	Miaow	3:49
12.	"Everybody's Talkin'" (Fred Neil)	Miaow	2:37
13.	"Prettiest Eyes"	Miaow	3:49
14.	"One Last Love Song"	Non-LP/CD single	3:33
Total length:			50:58

- Initial copies of the double-CD pack had a 1994 BBC Radio 1 session version of "Let Love Speak Up Itself" with Jacqueline Abbott on vocals instead of the single version fronted by Paul Heaton.
- Copies of the Canadian release also include the album tracks "I Think the Answer's Yes" and "I'm Your No.1 Fan".
- The US, German and Japanese releases also include a cover of "Dream a Little Dream" (music by Fabian Andre & Wilbur Schwandt, lyric by Gus Kahn).
- The Japanese release also includes "Les Yeux ouverts" (music by Fabian Andre & Wilbur Schwandt, French lyric by Brice Homs & Kurin Ternovizeff). Both it and "Dream a Little Dream" were recorded for the movie French Kiss. It was re-used in the film The Devil Wears Prada.

== Limited edition bonus disc ==
The limited-edition bonus disc contains non-LP/CD B-sides from their single releases.

All tracks are written by Dave Rotheray/Paul Heaton, except where noted.

No.	Title	Notes	Length
1.	"Diamonds" (M.G. Greaves)	(Taken from the single "Old Red Eyes Is Back")	2:27
2.	"They Used to Wear Black"	(Taken from the single "Bell Bottomed Tear")	3:07
3.	"Throw His Song Away"	(Taken from the single "36D")	2:54
4.	"Trevor You're Bizarre"	(Taken from the single "36D")	3:37
5.	"Love Wars" (Womack & Womack)	(Edited version of track taken from the single "Love Speak Up Itself" – originally 3:54)	3:41
6.	"You Just Can't Smile It Away" (Bill Withers)	(Taken from the single "You Keep It All In")	3:28
7.	"But 'Til Then"	(Taken from the single "I'll Sail This Ship Alone")	4:09
8.	"Size"	(Edited version of track taken from the single "Prettiest Eyes" – originally 5:40)	3:34
9.	"Frank and Delores" (M.G. Greaves)	(Taken from the single "Good as Gold")	3:39
10.	"I Started a Joke" (Barry, Robin & Maurice Gibb)	(Edited version of track taken from the single "We Are Each Other" – originally 4:33)	3:57
11.	"Woman in the Wall" (Recorded live at St. Georges Hall, Blackburn, 25 April 1992)	(Taken from the single "Bell Bottomed Tear")	5:17
12.	"Danielle Steel (The Enemy Within)"	(Edited version of track taken from the single "Let Love Speak Up Itself" – originally 3:39)	3:06
13.	"In Other Words I Hate You"	(Taken from the single "A Little Time")	1:52
14.	"His Time Ran Out"	(Taken for the single "We Are Each Other")	2:11

- Copies of the Canadian release also include "Fleet St. BC" (from "Old Red Eyes Is Back") and "Mr. Obsession" (from "One Last Love Song").

== CD single/CDEP B-sides ==
As was their usual modus operandi, the Beautiful South included unreleased material on the B-sides of the singles taken from their albums. One new single was released for this compilation. Details of CD singles for the other 13 tracks can be found under the entries for their original studio albums.

from the "One Last Love Song" CD1

- "One Last Love Song"
- "Right Man for the Job"
- "Java"

from the "One Last Love Song" CD2

- "One Last Love Song"
- "Mr Obsession"
- "You're Only Jealous"

== Personnel ==
- Paul Heaton – vocals
- Dave Hemingway – vocals
- Briana Corrigan – vocals (tracks 1–10)
- Jacqui Abbott – vocals (tracks 11–14)
- Dave Rotheray – guitar
- Sean Welch – bass
- Dave Stead – drums

== Charts ==
Chart performance for Carry On Up the Charts
Chart (1994–1995)	Peak position
Canada Top Albums/CDs (RPM)	50
German Albums (Offizielle Top 100)	53
Scottish Albums (Official Charts)	1
UK Albums (Official Charts)	1

== Certifications and sales ==
Certifications and sales for Carry On Up the Charts
Region	Certification	Certified units/sales
United Kingdom (BPI)	6× Platinum	1,828,890
