= Blue Is the Colour =

Studio album by the Beautiful South
- Released: 21 October 1996
- Genre: Alternative rock, pop rock
- Length: 49:56
- Label: Go!, Ark 21
- Producer: Jon Kelly

The Beautiful South chronology
Carry On Up the Charts (1994)	Blue Is the Colour (1996)	Quench (1998)

Singles from Blue Is the Colour
- 1. "Rotterdam (or Anywhere)" Released: 23 September 1996; 2. "Don't Marry Her" Released: 2 December 1996; 3. "Blackbird on the Wire" Released: 17 March 1997; 4. "Liars' Bar" Released: June 1997

Professional ratings
Review scores
Source	Rating
AllMusic	4/5 stars
Christgau's Consumer Guide	A
The Guardian	4/5 stars
NME	5/10
Q	4/5 stars
The Rolling Stone Album Guide	4/5 stars
Vox	8/10

Blue Is the Colour is the fifth studio album from English band the Beautiful South, released in October 1996 through Go! Discs and in America through Ark 21 Records. The album was released following the two singles "Pretenders to the Throne" and "Dream a Little Dream", which never featured on any album until the release of the second greatest hits Solid Bronze in 2001.

The album continued the melancholic tone of its predecessor Miaow, and is generally considered to be the band's darkest effort, reflecting Heaton's life at the time. This comes across in songs such as "Liars’ Bar" (about alcoholism), "The Sound of North America" (a sardonic look at capitalism), "Mirror" (prostitution), "Blackbird on the Wire", "Have Fun" (which Heaton has cited as his saddest song), and the self-explanatory "Alone".

The album spawned four singles, the first being "Rotterdam", which peaked at No. 5 on the UK Singles Chart in September 1996. The follow-ups were "Don't Marry Her", which reached No. 8 in December, "Blackbird on the Wire", which peaked at No. 23 in March 1997, and "Liar's Bar", which stalled outside the top 40 in June. On "Liars' Bar", Paul Heaton's vocal consciously imitates the style of Tom Waits, while in "Alone" the bass line serves as another allusion to him. The album debuted at #1 on the UK album chart on 2 November 1996 and went on to sell over 1.5m copies, becoming the group's best-selling studio album.

== Track listing ==
All tracks by Paul Heaton & Dave Rotheray (except where noted)

1. "Don't Marry Her" – 3:23
2. "Little Blue" – 3:17
3. "Mirror" – 4:05
4. "Blackbird on the Wire" – 4:57
5. "The Sound of North America" – 4:02
6. "Have Fun" – 4:44
7. "Liars' Bar" – 5:53
8. "Rotterdam (or Anywhere)" – 3:37
9. "Foundations" – 2:44
10. "Artificial Flowers" – 3:58 (Sheldon Harnick & Jerry Bock)
11. "One God" – 4:12
12. "Alone" – 4:58

== B-sides ==
As was their usual modus operandi, The Beautiful South included unreleased material on the B-sides of the singles taken from their albums.

from the "Rotterdam" CD5

- "Rotterdam" (single version)
- "A Minute's Silence"
- "Pollard"

from the "Don't Marry Her" CD1

- "Don't Marry Her" (clean version)
- "God Bless the Child" (Arthur Herzog, Jr. & Billie Holiday)
- "Without Her" (Harry Nilsson)

from the "Don't Marry Her" CD2

- "Don't Marry Her" (clean version)
- "Dream a Little Dream" aka "Dream a Little Dream of Me") (music by Fabian Andre & Wilbur Schwandt, lyrics by Gus Kahn)
- "Les Yeux Ouverts"* (music by Fabian Andre & Wilbur Schwandt, French lyrics by Brice Homs & Kurin Ternovizeff)

Note: The French version of "Dream a Little Dream of Me" ("Les Yeux Ouverts") was recorded for the movie French Kiss. It was re-used in the film The Devil Wears Prada.

from the "Blackbird on the Wire" CD1

- "Blackbird on the Wire"
- "Lean on Me" (Bill Withers) (featuring Paul with the London Community Gospel Choir from Later... with Jools Holland 24 Dec 1996)
- "You Just Can't Smile It Away" (Bill Withers) (featuring Paul with Jools Holland and Courtney Pine from Later... with Jools Holland 12 March 1994)

from the "Blackbird on the Wire" CD2

- "Blackbird on the Wire" (featuring Jools Holland on piano, taken from Later... with Jools Holland Special)
- "I'll Sail This Ship Alone" (taken from Later... with Jools Holland Special)
- "The Sound of North America" (featuring The Black Dyke Mills Band, taken from Later... with Jools Holland Special)

from the "Liars’ Bar" CD1

- "Liars' Bar" (remix, featuring The Black Dyke Mills Band, taken from Later... with Jools Holland Special)
- "Dumb" (an earlier, shorter version with an expletive. Re-recorded for the 1998 single on Quench, adding a bridge and replacing the expletive)
- "You've Done Nothing Wrong" (Iris DeMent) (with Jools Holland (piano) and Iris DeMent (vocals), taken from Later... with Jools Holland Special)

from the "Liar's Bar" CD2

- "Liars' Bar" (live remix, featuring The Black Dyke Mills Band, taken from Later... with Jools Holland Special)
- "The Opening of a New Book"
- "Hold On to What?" (taken from Later... with Jools Holland Special)

== Personnel ==
The Beautiful South

- Paul Heaton – vocals
- Dave Hemingway – vocals
- Jacqui Abbott – vocals
- Dave Rotheray – guitar
- Sean Welch – bass
- Dave Stead – drums

Additional musicians

- Damon Butcher – Keyboards, Programming, String Arrangements
- Martin Ditcham – Percussion
- Andy Duncan – Percussion, Programming

Technical

- John Brough – Producer, engineer
- Jon Kelly – Producer
- Ryan Art – Design
- Art Murphy – Paintings, Cover Painting
- Lawrence Watson – Photography

== Charts ==
=== Weekly charts ===
Chart (1996–1997)	Peak position
Belgian Albums (Ultratop Flanders)	10
New Zealand Albums (RMNZ)	49
Scottish Albums (OCC)	1
UK Albums (OCC)	1

=== Year-end charts ===
Chart (1996)	Position
UK Albums (OCC)	9
Chart (1997)	Position
UK Albums (OCC)	21

== Certifications ==
Region	Certification	Certified units/sales
United Kingdom (BPI)	5× Platinum	1,500,000^{^}
^{^} Shipments figures based on certification alone.
