= Gaze (album) =

Studio album by the Beautiful South
- Released: 27 October 2003 (UK)
- Genre: Alternative rock
- Length: 47:52
- Label: Go! Discs Records/Mercury
- Producers: Jon Kelly, John Brough, Paul Heaton

The Beautiful South chronology
Solid Bronze – Great Hits (2001)	Gaze (2003)	Golddiggas, Headnodders and Pholk Songs (2004)

Singles from Gaze
- 1. "Just a Few Things That I Ain't" Released: October 2003; 2. "Let Go with the Flow" Released: December 2003

Professional ratings
Review scores
Source	Rating
AllMusic	2.5/5 stars
The Guardian	2/5 stars
RTÉ	3/5 stars

Gaze is the eighth studio album by the rock band the Beautiful South. It was released in 2003 on Mercury Records. The release was accompanied by the Gaze With The Beautiful South tour. This was also the band's debut for Alison Wheeler, who replaced the departing Jacqui Abbott. All songs were written by Paul Heaton and Dave Rotheray.

== Track listing ==
All tracks composed by Paul Heaton and Dave Rotheray

1. "Pretty" 3:19
2. "Just a Few Things That I Ain't" 2:47
3. "Sailing Solo" 3:17
4. "Life Vs. The Lifeless" 3:35
5. "Get Here" 3:35
6. "Let Go with the Flow" 3:13
7. "The Gates" 4:11
8. "Angels and Devils" 2:49
9. "101% Man" 3:05
10. "Half of Him" 4:27
11. "Spit It All Out" 4:08 (UK only)
12. "The Last Waltz" (3:55)
13. "Loneliness" (4:52) (UK only hidden track)

== CD Single/CDEP B-Sides ==
As was their usual modus operandi, The Beautiful South included unreleased material on the B-sides of the singles taken from their albums.

from the "Just A Few Things That I Ain't" ECD1

- "Just A Few Things That I Ain't"
- "Cheap"
- "Care As You Go"
- "Just A Few Things That I Ain't" (music video)

from the "Just A Few Things That I Ain't" CD2

- "Just A Few Things That I Ain't"
- "The New Fence"
- "A Long Time Coming"

from the "Let Go With The Flow" CD1

- "Let Go With The Flow"
- "School Daze"

from the "Let Go With The Flow" CD2

- "Let Go With The Flow"
- "Don't Stop Moving" (BBC Radio 2 Session) (S. Ellis/S. Solomon/S Club 7)
- "Song For Whoever" (BBC Radio 2 Session)

== Personnel ==
The Beautiful South

- Paul Heaton - vocals
- Dave Hemingway - vocals
- Alison Wheeler - vocals
- Dave Rotheray - guitar
- Sean Welch - bass
- Dave Stead - drums

with:

- Damon Butcher - piano, keyboards
- Gary Hammond - percussion
- Tony Robertson - trumpet
- Kevin Brown - saxophone
- Gary Wallis - programming
