= Golddiggas, Headnodders and Pholk Songs =

Studio album by the Beautiful South
- Released: 25 October 2004
- Recorded: 2004
- Genre: Alternative rock
- Length: 43:41
- Label: Sony International
- Producers: Paul Heaton, Jon Kelly

The Beautiful South chronology
Gaze (2003)	Golddiggas, Headnodders and Pholk Songs (2004)	Gold (2006)

Singles from Golddiggas, Headnodders and Pholk Songs
- 1. "Livin' Thing" Released: October 2004; 2. "This Old Skin" Released: December 2004; 3. "This Will Be Our Year" Released: February 2005

Professional ratings
Review scores
Source	Rating
AllMusic	3.5/5 stars

Golddiggas, Headnodders and Pholk Songs is the ninth and penultimate album by the Beautiful South, released in 2004. It is almost entirely a covers album, with one notable exception. The track "This Old Skin" was originally claimed to have been written by Bobby Cristiansand and Barry Klein, and to have been originally performed by an obscure band called "The Heppelbaums" in the 1970s, but it was later revealed to have been an original composition by the usual Beautiful South writing team, Paul Heaton and Dave Rotheray. This was confirmed in 2006 by frontman Paul Heaton during a Question and Answer session entitled "Ask the Band". Prior to that, a website for The Heppelbaums had been created, in which many more clues to the real identity of the band were revealed. The domain was created on 5 August 2004 and registered to Sony, the band's record label. Although the website no longer exists, the contents can still be found on

"Livin' Thing", "This Old Skin", and "This Will Be Our Year" were all released as singles.

== Track listing ==
1. "You're The One That I Want" (originally recorded by John Travolta and Olivia Newton-John)
2. "Livin' Thing" (Electric Light Orchestra)
3. "This Will Be Our Year" (The Zombies)
4. "Ciao!" (Lush)
5. "Valentine" (Willie Nelson)
6. "Don't Fear the Reaper" (Blue Öyster Cult)
7. "This Old Skin" (an original Beautiful South song)
8. "Don't Stop Moving" (S Club 7)
9. "Till I Can't Take It Anymore" (Ben E. King)
10. "Rebel Prince" (Rufus Wainwright)
11. "Blitzkrieg Bop" (The Ramones)
12. "I'm Stone in Love with You" (The Stylistics)

== Personnel ==
The Beautiful South

- Paul Heaton - vocals
- Dave Hemingway - vocals
- Alison Wheeler - vocals
- Dave Rotheray - guitar
- Sean Welch - bass
- Dave Stead - drums

Additional instrumentation

- Damon Butcher - keyboards
- Gary Hammond - percussion
- Chip Taylor - guest vocal ("This Old Skin")
- Danny Thompson - double bass ("Livin' Thing")
- Martin Ditcham - additional percussion
- Jay Reynolds - programming ("I'm Stone in Love With You")
- Simon Hale - strings arranger
- The London Session Orchestra - strings

== CD Single/ECD B-Sides ==
Per their usual modus operandi, The Beautiful South included unreleased material on the B-sides of the singles taken from the album. All are cover versions in keeping with the album's theme.

from the "Livin' Thing" CD1

- "Livin' Thing" (Jeff Lynne) (Electric Light Orchestra)
- "I'm Living Good" (Dan Penn & Spooner Oldham) (The Ovations)

from the "Livin' Thing" CD2

- "Livin' Thing" (Jeff Lynne) (Electric Light Orchestra)
- "Lovin' You" (John Sebastian) (The Lovin' Spoonful)
- "Another Night with the Boys" (Gerry Goffin & Carole King) (The Drifters)

from the "This Old Skin" CD1

- "This Old Skin" (The Hepplebaums) (The Hepplebaums)
- "Lipstick Traces" aka "Lipstick Traces (on a Cigarette)" (Allen Toussaint) (Benny Spellman)

from the "This Old Skin" ECD2

- "This Old Skin" (The Hepplebaums) (The Hepplebaums)
- "Heaven Knows I'm Miserable Now" (Johnny Marr & Steven Morrissey) (The Smiths)
- "Livin' Thing" (music video)

from the "This Will Be Our Year" CD1

- "This Will Be Our Year" (Chris White) (The Zombies)
- "For the Good Times" (Kris Kristofferson) (Ray Price)

from "This Will Be Our Year" ECD2

- "This Will Be Our Year" (Chris White) (The Zombies)
- "Never Mind" (Harlan Howard) (Nanci Griffith)
- "This Old Skin" (music video)
