= How Long's a Tear Take to Dry? =

1999 single by the Beautiful South

Single by the Beautiful South

from the album Quench
- B-side: "Big Coin" (acoustic)
- Released: 8 March 1999
- Length: 3:20
- Label: Mercury; Go! Discs
- Songwriters: Paul Heaton; Dave Rotheray
- Producers: Jon Kelly; Paul Heaton

The Beautiful South singles chronology
"Dumb" (1998)	"How Long's a Tear Take to Dry?" (1999)	"The Table" (1999)

"How Long's a Tear Take to Dry?" is a single by British pop rock group the Beautiful South from their sixth album, Quench (1998). It was written by Paul Heaton and Dave Rotheray. The lyrics, which take the form of a conversation between two reconciling lovers, are noted for a reference to the TARDIS from Doctor Who. According to the book Last Orders at the Liars Bar: the Official Story of the Beautiful South, "How Long's a Tear Take to Dry?" was originally to be called "She Bangs the Buns" due to its chord structure reminiscent of Manchester's the Stone Roses. The song reached number 12 on the UK Singles Chart, becoming the band's 12th and final top-20 hit.

== Single release ==
"How Long's a Tear Take to Dry?" reached number 12 in the UK Singles Chart in March 1999. Although not released on vinyl, it was given a dual-CD release in the UK. B-sides included a remix of "How Long's a Tear Take to Dry?" as well as acoustic versions of three other songs: "Perfect 10", "Big Coin", and "Rotterdam". On 18 March 1999, the band performed "How Long's a Tear Take to Dry?" live on the BBC music programme Top of the Pops.

== Music video ==
The music video, available on The Beautiful South's compilation DVD Munch, is a humorous account of The Beautiful South on a world tour in order to pay for drinks at the local bar. The band is portrayed by cartoon versions of themselves, in a style reminiscent of 1960s-era Hanna-Barbera cartoons, and Scooby-Doo in particular. In the commentary track on the Munch DVD, Paul Heaton explains that the video was actually produced by Hanna-Barbera.

== Track listings ==
UK CD1

1. "How Long's a Tear Take to Dry?"
2. "How Long's a Tear Take to Dry?" (remix)
3. "Perfect 10" (acoustic)

UK CD2

1. "How Long's a Tear Take to Dry?"
2. "Big Coin" (acoustic)
3. "Rotterdam" (acoustic)

UK cassette single

1. "How Long's a Tear Take to Dry?"
2. "How Long's a Tear Take to Dry?" (remix)

European CD single

1. "How Long's a Tear Take to Dry?" (radio edit)
2. "How Long's a Tear Take to Dry?" (remix)
3. "Perfect 10" (acoustic)
4. "Rotterdam" (acoustic)

German CD single

1. "How Long's a Tear Take to Dry?"
2. "Dumb"
3. "I Sold My Heart to the Junkman"
4. "Suck Harder"

== Personnel ==
Personnel are adapted from the Quench liner notes.

- Paul Heaton – writing, vocals, production
- Dave Rotheray – writing, guitar
- Jacqueline Abbott – vocals
- Dave Hemingway – vocals
- Sean Welch – bass
- David Stead – drums
- Damon Butcher – keyboards
- Gary Hammond – percussion
- Kick Horns – brass
- Norman Cook – rhythm consultant
- Jon Kelly – production
- John Brough – engineering, mixing

== Charts ==
Chart (1999)	Peak position
Europe (Eurochart Hot 100)	51
Iceland (Íslenski Listinn Topp 40)	26
Scottish Singles Sales (Official Charts)	13
UK Singles (Official Charts)	12
