= Choke (album) =

Studio album by the Beautiful South
- Released: 29 October 1990 (UK)
- Recorded: 1990
- Genre: Alternative rock; pop rock
- Length: 36:55
- Label: GO! Discs; Elektra
- Producer: Mike Hedges

The Beautiful South chronology
| Welcome to the Beautiful South (1989) | Choke (1990) | 0898 (1992) |

Singles from Choke
- 1. "A Little Time" Released: 24 September 1990; 2. "My Book" Released: November 1990; 3. "Let Love Speak Up Itself" Released: 4 March 1991

Professional ratings
Review scores
| Source | Rating |
|---|---|
| AllMusic | 3.5/5 stars |
| Robert Christgau | (3-star Honorable Mention) |
| The Encyclopedia of Popular Music | 3/5 stars |
| MusicHound Rock: The Essential Album Guide | 3.5/5 stars |
| New Musical Express | 8/10 |
| The Rolling Stone Album Guide | 2/5 stars |

Choke is the second studio album by the English pop-rock group the Beautiful South, released in the UK on 29 October 1990. Upon its release, it was pushed to number 2 in the charts after the release of the band's only number one single, "A Little Time". It would remain in the charts for 22 weeks.

The album was followed by two more singles, both of which were flops. "My Book", which became the band's first single to chart outside the top 40, peaked at number 43, and "Let Love Speak Up Itself" reached number 51.

The original release of the album contained 11 tracks. The twelfth track, exclusive to the German release, was intended for the album from the beginning but was removed at a late stage of production. The cassette release of the standard version feature a long silence at the end of the first side, possibly indicating that this would have been the location originally intended for the track.

== Critical reception ==
Trouser Press wrote that "Choke makes it clear that the Beautiful South has ample pop sense and pure venom to keep its unique act going for quite a while." The New York Times wrote positively that the album "reads like an 11-chapter novella from a criminally sane mind."

In 1995, Q included Choke in its publication "In Our Lifetime: Q's 100 Best Albums 1986–94", a list compiled to celebrate its 100th issue.

== Track listing ==
All tracks by Paul Heaton, David Rotheray unless otherwise noted

1. "Tonight I Fancy Myself" – 3:26
2. "My Book" – 3:18
3. "Let Love Speak Up Itself" – 5:04
4. "Should've Kept My Eyes Shut" – 3:27
5. "I've Come for My Award" – 3:14
6. "Lips" – 1:11
7. "I Think the Answer's Yes" – 5:15
8. "A Little Time" – 3:00
9. "Mother's Pride" – 2:03
10. "I Hate You (But You're Interesting)" – 3:46
11. "The Rising of Grafton Street" – 3:05
12. "What You See Is What You Get" (Tony Hester) – 4:28 (German release only)

== Non-LP/CD B-Sides ==
The Beautiful South included unreleased material on the B-sides of the singles taken from their albums.

from the "A Little Time" 12" single and CDEP

- "A Little Time"
- "In Other Words I Hate You"
- "What You See Is What You Get" (Tony Hester)

from the "My Book" 12" single and CDEP

- "My Book"
- "Big Beautiful South"
- "Bigger Doesn't Mean Better"
- "Speak To Me"

from the "Let Love Speak Up Itself" 12" single and CDEP

- "Let Love Speak Up Itself"
- "Danielle Steel (The Enemy Within)" (this is a longer version of 3:39 later edited to 3:06, using an earlier fade-out for the limited edition bonus disc of Carry on up the Charts)
- "Love Wars" (Womack & Womack) (this is a longer version of 3:54 later edited to 3:41, using an earlier fade-out for the limited edition bonus disc of Carry on up the Charts)
- "Headbutting Husband"

== Personnel ==
- Paul Heaton - vocals
- Dave Hemingway - vocals
- Briana Corrigan - vocals
- Dave Rotheray - guitar
- Sean Welch - bass
- Dave Stead - drums

Additional personnel

- Gary Barnacle – Flute, Saxophone
- Kevin Brown – Saxophone
- Damon Butcher – Piano, Keyboards
- Rupert Coulson – Engineer
- Mike Hedges – Producer
- Ben Kape – Engineer
- Jody Kitson – Percussion
- Lance Phillips – Engineer
- Tony Robinson – Trumpet
- Pete Wingfield – Piano
