= Gold (The Beautiful South album) =

Greatest hits album by the Beautiful South
- Released: 10 March 2006 (UK)
- Recorded: 1988–2005
- Genre: Alternative rock, pop rock
- Length: 2:13:55 (133 Minutes)
- Label: Mercury
- Producer: The Beautiful South

The Beautiful South chronology
Golddiggas, Headnodders and Pholk Songs (2004)	Gold (2006)	Superbi (2006)

Professional ratings
Review scores
Source	Rating
AllMusic	4.5/5 stars

Gold by the Beautiful South is the third greatest hits album to be released by the band. It is similar in design to other "Gold" albums released by bands either currently or previously of various labels under the Universal Music Group. The album is a 2 disc collection of both single and album tracks taken from the first 8 of the band's back catalogue. It was released without the band's consent and had zero input from the band.

Although billed as being "packed with all their major hits", the album had several significant omissions. It also had a random play order, but did receive positive critical reception including a review in Allmusic which stated the album has a "good gathering of what is arguably some of the most popular British pop music of the 1990s".

== Track listing ==
=== Disc one ===
1. "Song for Whoever"
2. "A Little Time"
3. "Prettiest Eyes"
4. "Don't Marry Her"
5. "Alone"
6. "The Table"
7. "Old Red Eyes Is Back"
8. "Window Shopping for Blinds"
9. "Good as Gold (Stupid as Mud)"
10. "Closer Than Most"
11. "Baby Please Go"
12. "You Keep It All In"
13. "Dumb"
14. "36D"
15. "From Under the Covers"
16. "Let Love Speak Up Itself"
17. "Masculine Eclipse"
18. "Perfect 10"

=== Disc two ===
1. "Rotterdam (Or Anywhere)"
2. "Let Go with the Flow"
3. "Bell Bottomed Tear"
4. "I'll Sail This Ship Alone"
5. "Just a Few Things That I Ain't"
6. "Liars' Bar"
7. "Have You Ever Been Away"
8. "We Are Each Other"
9. "The Root of All Evil"
10. "Hit Parade"
11. "My Book"
12. "Losing Things"
13. "Everybody's Talkin'"
14. "Property Quiz"
15. "One Last Love Song"
16. "Mirror"
17. "One God"
18. "Blackbird on the Wire
