= Miaow (album) =

Studio album by the Beautiful South
- Released: 28 March 1994
- Recorded: Autumn 1993
- Genre: Alternative rock
- Length: 54:19
- Label: GO! Discs
- Producer: Jon Kelly

The Beautiful South chronology
| 0898 (1992) | Miaow (1994) | Carry On Up the Charts (1994) |

Singles from Miaow
- 1. "Good as Gold" Released: 28 February 1994; 2. "Everybody's Talkin'" Released: 16 May 1994; 3. "Prettiest Eyes" Released: 22 August 1994

Professional ratings
Review scores
| Source | Rating |
|---|---|
| AllMusic | 3/5 stars |
| Christgau's Consumer Guide | (3-star Honorable Mention) |
| The Encyclopedia of Popular Music | 3/5 stars |
| Music Week | 4/5 stars |
| NME | 5/10 |
| Select | 3/5 medals |

Miaow is the fourth album by English pop rock group the Beautiful South. It was released in 1994 via GO! Discs. As with most Beautiful South albums, the songs were written by Dave Rotheray and Paul Heaton. The cover originally depicted numerous dogs seated in a music hall with a gramophone on the stage. However, EMI (the owner of the His Master's Voice intellectual property at the time) made the band withdraw it as they felt it mocked their trademark, and the band put out a second cover depicting four dogs in a boat. Both paintings were created by Michael Sowa.

The album's tracks reflect a depressing period in Heaton's life, and this continues with the follow-up album Blue is the Colour (1996). The songs also led the group's first female singer, Briana Corrigan, to leave the band; after Heaton sent her copies of the songs, including "Mini-correct" and "Worthless Lie", she swiftly made the decision to leave. Heaton employed the then-unknown Jacqui Abbott, who went on to appear on every album up to Painting It Red, to replace Corrigan.

Miaow reached number six on the UK Album Charts, and three singles were released from it: "Good as Gold", "Everybody's Talkin'", and "Prettiest Eyes". Norman Cook, former band member of the Housemartins with Paul Heaton, is credited in the sleeve notes as doing the "Programming on Hooligans" (track 7). The song later appeared on The Beautiful Game, the various artists UEFA Euro 1996 tie-in album.

The album is now owned by EMI Records.

== Singles ==
- "Good as Gold" – released: February 1994 chart position: 23
- "Everybody's Talkin'" – released: May 1994, chart position: 12
- "Prettiest Eyes" – released: August 1994, chart position: 37

== Track listing ==
All songs written by Paul Heaton and Dave Rotheray, except where noted.

1. "Hold On to What?" 6:28
2. "Good as Gold (Stupid as Mud)” 3:50
3. "Especially for You" 3:49
4. "Everybody's Talkin'" (Fred Neil) 2:39
5. "Prettiest Eyes" 4:10
6. "Worthless Lie" 6:39
7. "Hooligans Don't Fall in Love" 4:47
8. "Hidden Jukebox" 3:26
9. "Hold Me Close (Underground)" 5:28
10. "Tattoo" 4:42
11. "Mini-Correct" 3:48
12. "Poppy" 4:26

== CD single/CDEP B-sides ==
As was their usual modus operandi, The Beautiful South included unreleased material on the B-sides of the singles taken from their albums.

from the "Good As Gold" CD1

- "Good As Gold (Stupid As Mud)"
- "Love Adjourned"
- "Minicorrect" (Demo Version )

from the "Good As Gold" CD2

- "Good As Gold (Stupid As Mud)"
- "Frank And Delores" (M.G. Greaves)
- "One Man's Rubbish" (Klivington/Greaves)

from the "Everybody's Talkin'" (Fred Neil) CD1

- "Everybody's Talkin'" (single version)
- "A Way With The Blues" (M.G. Greaves)
- "Let Love Speak Up Itself" (Recorded for the Emma Freud Show, Radio One, March 1994)

from the "Everybody's Talkin'" (Fred Neil) CD2

- "Everybody's Talkin'" (LP/CD version)
- "Nearer To God" (M.G. Greaves)
- "A Piece Of Sky" (M.G. Greaves)

from the "Prettiest Eyes" CD1

- "Prettiest Eyes"
- "The Best We Can"
- ”Size” (this is a longer version of 5:40 later edited to 3:24, using an earlier fade-out on the instrumental for the limited edition bonus disc of Carry on up the Charts)

from the "Prettiest Eyes" CD2

- "Prettiest Eyes"
- "Why Can't I" (M.G. Greaves)
- "Missing Her Now" (M.G. Greaves)

== Personnel ==
- Paul Heaton – vocals
- Dave Hemingway – vocals
- Jacqui Abbott – vocals
- Dave Rotheray – guitar
- Sean Welch – bass
- Dave Stead – drums

with:

- Damon Butcher – keyboards
- Martin Ditcham – percussion
