= The Cross Eyed Rambler =

Studio album by Paul Heaton
- Released: 7 July 2008
- Genre: Pop
- Length: 52:42
- Label: W14 Music
- Producer: Jay Reynolds

Paul Heaton chronology
| Under the Influence (2004) | The Cross Eyed Rambler (2008) | Acid Country (2010) |

Professional ratings
Review scores
| Source | Rating |
|---|---|
| BBC Music | (Positive) |
| In The News | (8/10) |
| Planet Sound | (8/10) |
| The Independent | (Positive) |
| The Skinny | 3/5 stars |
| The Times | 4/5 stars |

The Cross Eyed Rambler is a 2008 album by Paul Heaton. It was his first album since the breakup of The Beautiful South in 2007 and his second solo album after 2001's Fat Chance. The album contains the single "Mermaids and Slaves".

== Track listing ==
1. "The Cross Eyed Rambler"
2. "I Do"
3. "Mermaids and Slaves"
4. "The Pub"
5. "A Good Old Fashioned Town"
6. "The Ring From Your Hand"
7. "The Balcony"
8. "Deckchair Collapsed"
9. "Little Red Rooster"
10. "God Bless Texas"
11. "The Kids These Days"
12. "Everything Is Everything"

Bonus tracks

13. "She Rolled Her Own" (Digi Packaging Release Only)
14. "Loving You Like I Do (Is Killing Me)" (Digi Packaging Release Only)
