= Painting It Red =

Studio album by the Beautiful South
- Released: 9 October 2000
- Genres: Indie rock, pop rock
- Label: Ark 21
- Producers: Jon Kelly, Paul Heaton

The Beautiful South chronology
Quench (1998)	Painting It Red (2000)	Solid Bronze (2001)

Singles from Painting It Red
- 1. "Closer Than Most" Released: September 2000; 2. "The River"/"Just Checkin'" Released: December 2000

Professional ratings
Review scores
Source	Rating
AllMusic	3/5 stars
Pitchfork	6.1/10
Robert Christgau	B+

Painting It Red is the seventh album by the Beautiful South, released in 2000. A concept album about impending middle age, Painting it Red is among the band's longest. A two-disc UK bonus version contains 20 tracks. The American release on Ark21 has only 17 tracks.

The album made it to number 2 in the charts, and two singles were produced: "Closer Than Most", which reached number 22 in September, and the double A-side "The River"/"Just Checkin'", which reached number 59 in December.

== Critical reception ==
Exclaim! wrote that the album "shows the strains of a band running out of new ideas [although] the music is certainly not terrible and there are good moments, such as 'Baby Please Go' or '10,000 Feet'." The Washington Post wrote that it "does occasionally muster an assertive beat--in part thanks to the assistance of Norman 'Fatboy Slim' Cook, who formerly played with Heaton and Hemingway in the Housemartins."

== Track listing ==
=== British, European, Canadian & Japanese versions ===
1. "Who's Gonna Tell?" - 2:37 (UK, Canada, Europe & Japan only)
2. "Closer Than Most" - 3:07
3. "Just Checkin'" - 3:38
4. "Hit Parade" - 3:45
5. "Masculine Eclipse" - 3:55
6. "'Til You Can't Tuck It In" - 3:30
7. "If We Crawl" - 4:14
8. "Tupperware Queen" - 3:34
9. "Half-Hearted Get (Is Second Best)" - 4:24
10. "White Teeth" - 3:04 (UK two-disc set only)
11. "The River" - 5:23
12. "Baby Please Go" - 2:46
13. "You Can Call Me Leisure" - 4:31
14. "Final Spark" - 5:03
15. "10,000 Feet" - 3:01
16. "Hot on the Heels of Heartbreak" - 4:00
17. "The Mediterranean" - 4:02
18. "A Little Piece of Advice" - 3:55
19. "Property Quiz" - 3:50
20. "Chicken Wings" - 4:29 (UK, Canada, Europe & Japan only)

=== US version ===
All songs written by Paul Heaton and David Rotheray.

1. "Closer Than Most"
2. "Just Checkin'"
3. "Hit Parade"
4. "Masculine Eclipse"
5. "'Til You Can't Tuck It In"
6. "If We Crawl"
7. "Tupperware Queen"
8. "Half-Hearted Get (Is Second Best)"
9. "The River"
10. "Baby Please Go"
11. "You Can Call Me Leisure"
12. "Final Spark"
13. "10,000 Feet"
14. "Hot on the Heels of Heartbreak"
15. "The Mediterranean"
16. "A Little Piece of Advice"
17. "Property Quiz"

== CD single/CDEP B-sides ==
As was their usual practice, the Beautiful South included unreleased material on the B-sides of the singles taken from their albums.

from "Closer Than Most" (CD1)

- "Closer Than Most"
- "Moths"
- "The Table" (Acoustic, recorded live at The Cambridge Folk Festival, July 29, 2000)

from "Closer Than Most" (CD2)

- "Closer Than Most"
- "The State That I'm In"
- "Blackbird On The Wire" (Acoustic, recorded live at The Cambridge Folk Festival, July 29, 2000)

from "The River/Just Checkin'" (CD1)

- "The River" (Edit)
- "Just Checkin'" (Remixed by David Bascombe & Norman Cook)
- "Valentine's Day W**k"

from "Just Checkin'"/The River" (CD2)

- "Just Checkin'" (Remixed by David Bascombe & Norman Cook)
- "The River" (Edit)
- "Little Chef"

== Personnel ==
The Beautiful South
- Paul Heaton - vocals
- Dave Hemingway - vocals
- Jacqui Abbott - vocals
- Dave Rotheray - guitar
- Sean Welch - bass
- Dave Stead - drums
