= Michael Sowa =

German artist (born 1945)

Michael Sowa (born 1945) is a German artist known mainly for his paintings, which are variously whimsical or surreal. His paintings often feature animals and are titled in English and German. His art is widely available as posters, notecards, postcards, and calendars.

Sowa studied at the Berlin State School of Fine Arts for seven years and worked briefly as an art teacher before focusing entirely on his career as a painter and illustrator. A book of 50 paintings titled Sowa's Ark : An Enchanted Bestiary was published in 1996. He also illustrated Esterhazy, The Rabbit Prince by Irene Dische and Hans M. Enzensberger. He is the illustrator of The Little King December and A Bear Called Sunday, both authored by Axel Hacke.

He was the cover artist for several albums, including Mad Season by Matchbox Twenty and two covers for The Beautiful South's Miaow and for their single "Everybody's Talkin'."

He gained new followers for his work on the 2001 film Amélie where his art on the walls comes to life. Sowa contributes illustrations to the satirical German magazine, Titanic, and he also did the art work for magazine covers of several well-known periodicals, most notably the December 2, 2002 issue of The New Yorker.

When Sowa's children grew older he began painting in both Berlin and in the country.
