= Acid Country =

Studio album by Paul Heaton
- Released: 13 September 2010
- Genres: Alternative, rock
- Length: 49:26
- Label: Proper
- Producer: Paul Heaton

Paul Heaton chronology
The Cross Eyed Rambler (2007)	Acid Country (2010)	Paul Heaton Presents the 8th (2012)

Professional ratings
Review scores
Source	Rating
PopMatters	6/10

Acid Country is the third solo album by British artist Paul Heaton, following his debut album (under the guise of Biscuit Boy a.k.a. Crackerman) Fat Chance and second solo album as himself, The Cross Eyed Rambler.

The album was officially released for download and purchase in the shops on 13 September 2010 and charted at number 51. Heaton had done a UK "pub tour", cycling around various pubs all across the UK performing to promote his new album. Heaton has also had numerous recent radio and television appearances to promote the release of Acid Country.

== Track listing ==
All tracks by Paul Heaton and Jonny Lexus, except where noted.

1. "The Old Radio" – 4:05
2. "Even A Palm Tree" – 3:55
3. "It's A Young Man's Game" – 6:58
4. "Welcome To The South" – 3:08
5. "Life Of A Cat" – 4:23
6. "House Party" – 5:57 (Heaton)
7. "This House" – 4:03
8. "The Ladder's Bottom Rung" – 3:57
9. "Acid Country" – 7:59
10. "A Cold One In The Fridge" – 5:01 (Heaton)
11. "The World Over" – 5:12 (download only)

== Personnel ==
- Tom Delgety – mixing
- Sally Ellyson – vocals
- Shirlaine Forrest – photography
- Paul Heaton – harmonica, producer, vocals
- Tom Knott – mixing
- Dawn Landes – engineer
- Jonny Lexus – guitar, backing vocals
- Christian Madden – mellotron, omnichord, organ, piano, electric piano, producer, synthesizer
- Nicky Madden – bass harmonica, engineer, saxophone
- Pete Marshall – drums, glockenspiel, violin, backing vocals
- Ruth Skipper – vocals
- Jonny Wright – bass, backing vocals
