= This Old Skin =

Single by The Beautiful South

from the album Golddiggas, Headnodders and Pholk Songs
- Released: December 2004 (UK)
- Genre: Pop rock
- Label: Sony Music UK
- Songwriters: Paul Heaton and Dave Rotheray

The Beautiful South singles chronology
"Livin' Thing" (2004)	"This Old Skin" (2004)	"This Will Be Our Year" (2005)

"This Old Skin" is a song by The Beautiful South which appeared on their 2004 covers album, Golddiggas, Headnodders and Pholk Songs, and was the second single released from the album. It was purportedly written by Bobby Cristiansand and Barry Klein of the band The Heppelbaums, supposedly appearing on their album Hunt For The White Nightingale. In fact, it was written by Paul Heaton and Dave Rotheray of the Beautiful South. When performed live, the song was accompanied by a pastiche of a 1970s music documentary, with The Beautiful South appearing as The Heppelbaums.

The song appeared on the UK charts for 2 weeks, entering at #63 on 18 December 2004 and peaked at #43 the following week.

The Beautiful South single comprised two CDs with the following tracks:

== CD1 ==
1. "This Old Skin" (3:55)
2. "Lipstick Traces" (3:18)

== CD2 ==
1. "This Old Skin" (3:55)
2. "Heaven Knows I'm Miserable Now" (4:03)
3. "Livin' Thing" (Video) (3:13)
