= 36D =

Single by The Beautiful South

from the album 0898 Beautiful South
- Released: 14 September 1992
- Genre: Alternative rock
- Length: 5:16
- Label: Go! Discs
- Songwriters: Paul Heaton, Dave Rotheray
- Producers: Jon Kelly, The Beautiful South

The Beautiful South singles chronology
"Bell Bottomed Tear" (1992)	"36D" (1992)	"Good as Gold (Stupid as Mud)" (1994)

"36D" is a song written by Paul Heaton and Dave Rotheray and performed by The Beautiful South. The song was originally found on the album 0898 Beautiful South and later appeared on two greatest hits compilations - 1994's Carry on up the Charts and 2007's Soup. As a single it reached no. 46 in the UK Singles Chart, spending two weeks in the Top 75 in 1992. The album version ran for 5 minutes 15 seconds.

The overtly sexual content of the song may be a reason why it did not chart highly as a single, as opposed to many of their other tongue-in-cheek songs like "Song for Whoever" and "Don't Marry Her". The song was one of the catalysts for Briana Corrigan leaving as she thought it painted glamour models, especially Page 3 girls, in a bad light when the media who put them there should be blamed instead.
