= Whatcha See Is Whatcha Get (song) =

Single by The Dramatics

from the album Whatcha See Is Whatcha Get
- B-side: "Thank You For Your Love"
- Released: June 1971
- Genre: R&B, soul
- Length: 3:57 (album version); 3:34 (single version)
- Label: Volt/Stax
- Songwriter: Tony Hester

The Dramatics singles chronology
"Your Love Was Strange" (1969)	"Whatcha See Is Whatcha Get" (1971)	"Get Up and Get Down" (1972)

"Whatcha See Is Whatcha Get" is a 1971 single written and produced by Tony Hester and performed by The Dramatics. The rhythm charts, strings and horns were arranged by Johnny Allen. The tracks were recorded at United Sound Recording Studio in Detroit, Michigan.

== Song Background ==
The song is noted for its scatting by the lead singer William "Wee Gee" Howard, and for the bass singer, Willie Ford, saying "Look at me." The song was co-led by Ron Banks, with other lead parts shared by the other members, Larry "Squirrel" Demps and Elbert Wilkins.

== Chart performance ==
The song was a #3 hit on the Billboard R&B charts, and broke into the Top 10 of the Billboard Hot 100, peaking at #9. In Canada, it reached #44.

== Cover versions ==
- The song has been covered by British pop group The Beautiful South on their 1990 album Choke
- American singer and drag queen RuPaul covered it on the 1993 soundtrack album Addams Family Values: Music from the Motion Picture
- The American experimental rock band When People Were Shorter and Lived Near the Water covered it on their 1994 album Bill Kennedy's Showtime
- Duo Hall & Oates included it on their 2004 album Our Kind of Soul
- Gerald Albright included it, as an instrumental, on his 2008 album Sax For Stax as "What You See Is What You Get".

== Later uses ==
- "Whatcha See Is Whatcha Get" is featured in Mel Stuart's 1973 documentary film Wattstax. This film chronicles the historic 1972 Wattstax concert at the Los Angeles Memorial Coliseum which includes a legendary lineup of R&B, Soul, Pop, and gospel artists from the Stax Records label.
- The Dramatics performed "Whatcha See Is Whatcha Get" in the racially charged and raunchy Darktown Strutters, a blaxploitation comedy film produced by Gene Corman in 1975.
- In 2007, "Whatcha See Is Whatcha Get" was included in the soundtrack for the American 1960s/1970s period film Talk to Me, starring Don Cheadle.
- The song was featured in the second season of the FX series Fargo, in the episode "The Gift of the Magi". It also features in the closing credits of the James Randi documentary, An Honest Liar (2014).

== Samples ==
It was sampled by hip-hop trio Injury Reserve on "Yo", the opening track of their 2015 album Live from the Dentist Office. The intro was also sampled on "Big Daddy Kane vs. Dolemite" (1990) by rapper Big Daddy Kane, featuring comedian Rudy Ray Moore, from Kane's album Taste of Chocolate.
