= Live at the BBC (The Beautiful South album) =

Album by The Beautiful South

Live At The BBC is a compilation album by The Beautiful South. It was released in May 2011 and features three CDs and one DVD.
