= Boothill Foot Tappers =

- Genres: English folk music, skiffle
- Instruments: Squeezeboxes, fiddle, guitar, vocals, banjo, washboard, accordion, drums
- Years active: 1982–1985, 2011
- Labels: Go! Discs / Phonogram

The Boothill Foot Tappers was a British folk/skiffle/bluegrass band that was formed in 1982 and associated with the folk music revival in the United Kingdom.

They were featured in the Ben Elton-presented show South of Watford on London Weekend Television in 1984, as part of the emerging British roots movement based in London, along with other acts including the Pogues. The Boothill Foot Tappers had a minor hit in July of that year, in the UK Singles Chart with "Get Your Feet Out of My Shoes". The band split up at the end of 1985.

== Members ==
- Danny Heatley (drums)
- Kevin Walsh (acoustic guitar, vocals)
- Slim (Clive Pain) (accordion)
- Chris Thompson (banjo, vocals)
- Marnie Stephenson (washboard, vocals)
- Merrill Heatley (vocals)
- Wendy May (Billingsley) (vocals)
- Lloyd Winter (double bass, vocals)

== Discography ==
=== Albums ===
Ain't That Far from Boothill (1985)

1. "Love and Affection"
2. "Jealousy"
3. "Pride Takes a Fall"
4. "Nothing Ventured"
5. "Feelings"
6. "Sunday Evening"
7. "Get Your Feet Out of My Shoes"
8. "Have You Got the Confidence for the Trick?"
9. "Stand or Fall"
10. "What's the Matter?"
11. "There's No Way (I Can Leave You Alone)"
12. "Too Much Time"

=== Singles ===
- "Get Your Feet Out of My Shoes" (1984) - UK No. 64
- "Jealousy" (1985) - UK No. 77
- "Too Much Time" (1985)
- "Love and Affection" (1985)
