= Alison Wheeler =

British singer (born 1972)

- Born: 4 March 1972 (age 54)
- Genres: Pop
- Occupation: Singer-songwriter
- Instruments: Vocals, piano
- Member of: The South
- Formerly of: Melt City; Treehouse; Citizen K; The Beautiful South

Alison Wheeler (born 4 March 1972) is a British singer, best known as the female vocalist for The Beautiful South from 2003 until they disbanded in 2007.

Wheeler's career in music began at university in a cover band called Melt City, alongside Hal Ritson, now of The Young Punx, Kev Dowd, now of Lowbrow, James Woods, now of Jam Sandwich and Dom Wilhelm, (of 1990s UK pop punk act Satellite Beach). Upon arriving in London, she joined indie band Junk, subsequently renamed Treehouse.

In 2002, her work with London gospel band Citizen K led to an introduction to Dave Hemingway of the Beautiful South. After working on Hemingway's yet unreleased solo album, Hemingway promised a recommendation to the Beautiful South's Paul Heaton, since a new album was in the making, despite the unexpected departure of the former band member Jacqui Abbott. By 2003, with the release of Gaze, Wheeler was a member of the band. Gaze was followed by albums Goldiggas Headnodders and Pholk Songs and Superbi.

She was nicknamed Alison 'Lady' Wheeler jokingly by her bandmates in The Beautiful South who felt that her demeanour and her education at Trinity College, Cambridge, were in contrast to the band's trademark working-class northern image.

The band split in January 2007 due to "musical similarities". She spent some time enjoying motherhood and recorded a solo project.

== The Beautiful South ==
Members of Beautiful South (including Wheeler and singer Dave Hemingway but minus ex-lead singers Paul Heaton and Jacqui Abbott) got back together as The New Beautiful South (as a touring band rather than a recording act), which, in time, was re-branded as The South.

In 2010, she recorded the track "Move A Little Closer" with Jon Windle (formerly of Little Man Tate) for his debut solo album Step Out The Man. Since 2008, Wheeler has been working with Amanda Frolich recording children's albums for "Amanda's Action Club".

During 2012 and 2013, she toured the UK with The South, playing old Beautiful South songs as well as songs from her album with Dave Hemingway called Sweet Refrains.

Wheeler is still a member of The South despite Dave Hemingway leaving the band in 2017.
