= Old Red Eyes Is Back =

Single by The Beautiful South

from the album 0898 Beautiful South
- Released: 30 December 1991
- Genre: Pop rock, alternative rock
- Length: 3:35
- Label: Go! Discs
- Songwriters: Paul Heaton, Dave Rotheray
- Producers: Jon Kelly, The Beautiful South

The Beautiful South singles chronology
""Let Love Speak Up Itself"" (1991)	"Old Red Eyes Is Back" (1991)	"We Are Each Other" (1992)

"Old Red Eyes Is Back" is a song written by Paul Heaton and Dave Rotheray and performed by the Beautiful South. The song was originally released on their third album, 0898 Beautiful South (1992). It features as the opening track and was the first single released from the album in late 1991 by Go! Discs. Heaton wrote the song following a heavy night of drinking Guinness with a Contractor from Hartburn, Stockton-on-Tees. The single reached a peak of No. 22 in the UK and became the band's 5th UK top 40 single.

Lead vocals are provided by Paul Heaton, with co-vocalists Briana Corrigan and Dave Hemingway featured occasionally in the background.

The song title is a play on that of Frank Sinatra's 1973 album Ol' Blue Eyes Is Back. Heaton's lyrics deal with a man named 'Old Red', clearly a man suffering with alcoholism, as Heaton has at several times in his life. The verses detail Old Red's drinking habits and how it is affecting his health ("he pours another drink and listens to his body thaw") before the final verse announces "Old Red, he died..." The chorus reminisces about the things he has sacrificed for his drink: "all the things I could have done instead". The subject matter is a common theme throughout the Beautiful South's material, but "Old Red Eyes Is Back" is arguably the most graphic account of the perils of alcoholism amongst their song catalogue.

The music video is fittingly set in a pub and features two Paul Heatons. One, a sober looking man who sings the lyrics telling the story of 'Old Red'. The other, who sings the chorus, is presumably meant to be 'Old Red', with messy long hair and his face looking rough from heavy drinking.

== Charts ==
Chart (1992)	Peak position
UK Singles (OCC)	22
UK Airplay (Music Week)	3

== Certifications ==
Certifications for "Old Red Eyes Is Back"
Region	Certification	Certified units/sales
United Kingdom (BPI) Sales since 2004	Silver	200,000^{‡}
^{‡} Sales+streaming figures based on certification alone.
