= A Little Time =

1990 single by the Beautiful South

Single by the Beautiful South

from the album Choke
- B-side: "In Other Words I Hate You"; "What You See Is What You Get"
- Released: 24 September 1990
- Genre: Pop
- Length: 2:58
- Label: Go! Discs
- Songwriters: Paul Heaton; David Rotheray
- Producer: Mike Hedges

The Beautiful South singles chronology
"I'll Sail This Ship Alone" (1989)	"A Little Time" (1990)	"My Book" (1990)

"A Little Time" is a song by English pop rock group the Beautiful South, the first single to be released from their second album, Choke (1990). It was released in September 1990 by Go! Discs and consists of a duet featuring vocalists Dave Hemingway and Briana Corrigan. Produced by Mike Hedges, "A Little Time" is the band's only single to reach number one on the UK singles chart, and it peaked inside the top 20 in Austria, Belgium, Ireland, Luxembourg and the Netherlands. Its accompanying music video was directed by Nick Brandt and won the British Video of the Year award at the 1991 Brit Awards.

== Lyrical content ==
The Beautiful South have given different interpretations about the song's meaning. Songwriter Paul Heaton stated that "A Little Time" is about relationships in general, while co-writer David Rotheray considers it an unconventional love song. Briana Corrigan explained that the song encapsulates an everyday situation, as love is not always a good thing and can lead to conflict.

== Critical reception ==
Upon its release, Nick Duerden, writing for Record Mirror, described the song as "a sloping country lilt that unfolds so gracefully and quietly that it is truly touching" and added that the band's "sardonic humour is present as ever". Nick Robinson of Music Week praised it as a "beautiful ballad" and "a tale of a crumbling relationship softly sung over a light rhythm complete with strings and piano".

== Awards ==
The music video for "A Little Time", directed by English photographer Nick Brandt, won the 1991 Brit Awards for British Video of the Year and is their only Brit Award to date. It features a fighting couple (played by Hemingway and Corrigan), a trashed house, a load of flour and feathers, and a teddy bear's head impaled on the end of a kitchen knife.

== Track listings ==
- 7-inch single and Australasian CD single
1. "A Little Time"
2. "In Other Words I Hate You"
- UK and European CD single
1. "A Little Time"
2. "In Other Words I Hate You"
3. "What You See Is What You Get"

== Charts ==
=== Weekly charts ===
Chart (1990–1991)	Peak position
Australia (ARIA)	72
Austria (Ö3 Austria Top 40)	20
Belgium (Ultratop 50 Flanders)	17
Europe (Eurochart Hot 100)	3
Germany (GfK)	47
Ireland (IRMA)	2
Luxembourg (Radio Luxembourg)	2
Netherlands (Dutch Top 40)	24
Netherlands (Single Top 100)	18
UK Singles (OCC)	1

=== Year-end charts ===
Chart (1990)	Position
UK Singles (OCC)	12

== Certifications ==
Region	Certification	Certified units/sales
United Kingdom (BPI)	Gold	400,000^{^}
^{^} Shipments figures based on certification alone.

== Release history ==
Region	Date	Format(s)	Label(s)	Ref.
United Kingdom	24 September 1990	—N/a	Go! Discs	
Australia	4 February 1991	7-inch vinyl; cassette	Go! Discs; London; Polydor	
Australia	10 June 1991	CD	Go! Discs; London; Polydor	
