= Enzo Enzo =

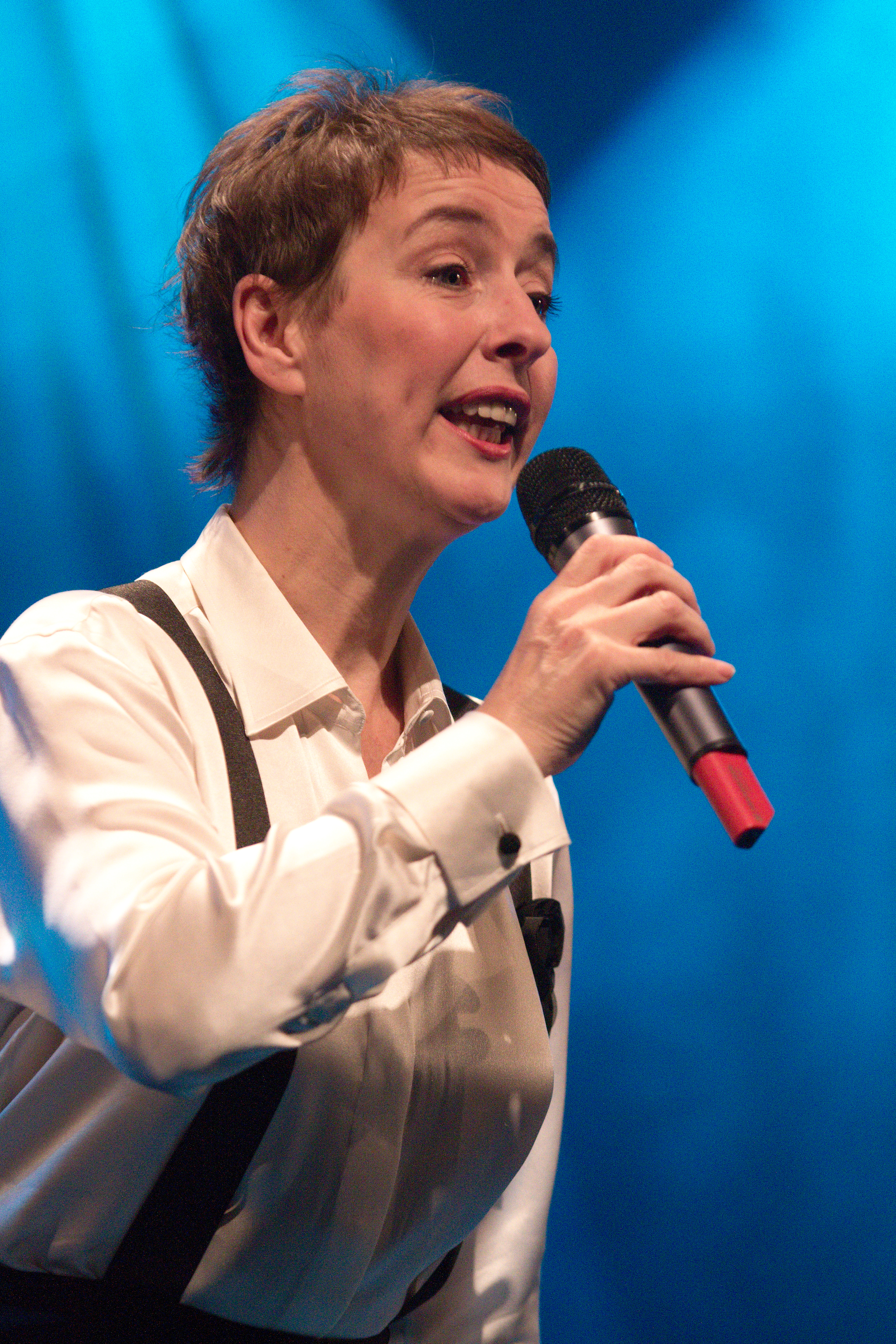
Enzo Enzo in 2010

Körin Ternovtzeff, known professionally as Enzo Enzo (born 29 August 1959), is a French singer and multi-instrumentalist, known for her songs for children and her versions in French of popular songs.

== Life ==
Körin Ternovtzeff was born from a Russian family in Paris on 29 August 1959.

She worked as a roadie for the French rock band Téléphone in 1978, and was the bass player of Lili Drop from 1981 to 1985.

She released her first solo album in 1990.

== Albums ==
- 1990: Enzo Enzo
- 1994: Deux
- 1997: Oui
- 1999: Enfin seuls (with Kent)
- 2001: Le jour d'à côté
- 2004: Paroli
- 2007: Chansons d'une maman
- 2008: 3 histoires comme ça
- 2009: Clap!
- 2010: Têtue
- 2011: Chansons d'une maman pour culottes courtes
- 2021: Eau calme
