= Paul Heaton =

British musician (born 1962)

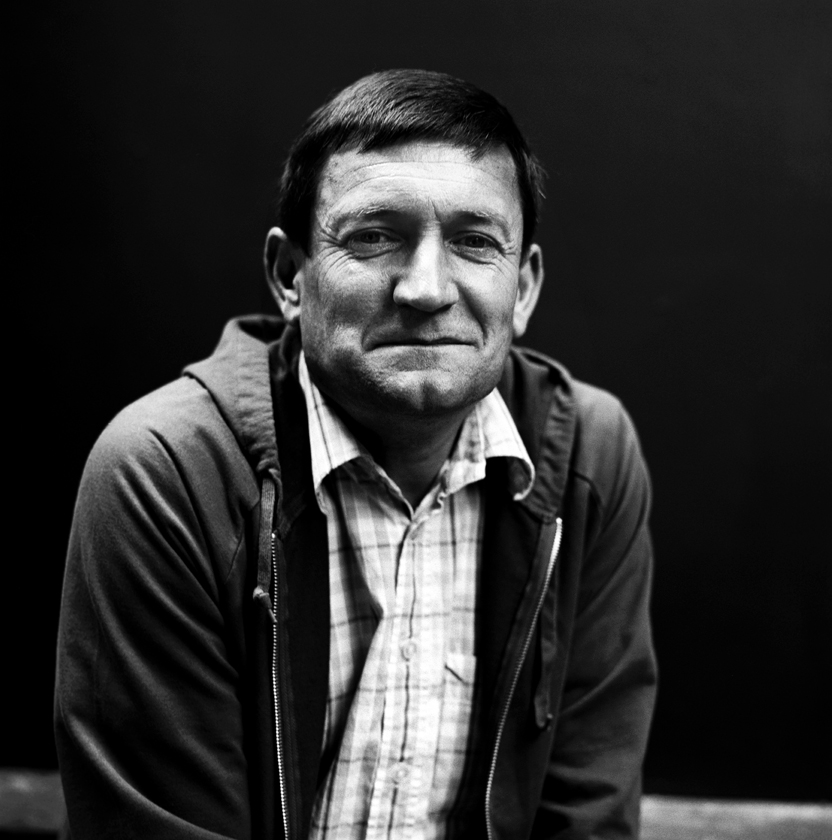
- Heaton in 2009

Background information
- Born: Paul David Heaton; 9 May 1962 (age 64); Bromborough, Cheshire, England
- Genres: Indie pop; pop; alternative rock
- Occupations: Musician, singer-songwriter
- Instruments: Vocals, harmonica, guitar, piano
- Years active: 1982–present
- Labels: Go! Discs, Universal, Ark 21, Mercury, Sony BMG
- Website: paulheaton.co.uk

Paul David Heaton (born 9 May 1962) is an English singer-songwriter. He was the lead singer and main lyricist of the Housemartins, who had commercial success in the UK and other European countries from 1985 to 1988, releasing several singles, including "Happy Hour" and the UK number one "Caravan of Love" in 1986, before the group disbanded. Heaton then formed the Beautiful South with the Housemartins' drummer, Dave Hemingway. The band's debut single, "Song for Whoever", and debut album, Welcome to the Beautiful South, were released in 1989 to commercial success. They had a series of hits throughout the 1990s, including the number-one single "A Little Time", and disbanded in 2007.

Heaton pursued a solo career, which produced three albums, and in 2014 he released What Have We Become?, a collaboration with former Beautiful South vocalist Jacqui Abbott. As of 2022, he has recorded four more albums with her: Wisdom, Laughter and Lines in 2015, Crooked Calypso in 2017, Manchester Calling in 2020, and N.K-Pop in 2022.

The British newspaper The Guardian described Heaton as "one of our finest songwriters: his music reveals an exuberant ear for melody, his lyrics a keen eye and a brilliant wit". AllMusic said: "The warm, mellifluous voice of Paul Heaton often masks the jagged satirical content of his lyrics."

== Early life ==
Paul David Heaton was born in Bromborough, Wirral, Merseyside (formerly Cheshire), on 9 May 1962 to parents Doris and Horace Heaton. When he was aged four his family, including his two older brothers Mark and Adrian Heaton, relocated to Sheffield, where Heaton's father took a job in management. Heaton described his childhood as being "fairly middle-class, although you wouldn't know it given the schools I went to and the friends I had".

Heaton moved to Chipstead, Surrey, during his adolescent years, an early life Heaton described as "bred in Sheffield, fed in Surrey". While in Surrey he, and his brother Adrian, formed their first band "Tools Down" with friends John Box and Stuart Mair. After this he met Norman Cook and Chris Lang and formed a band called the Stomping Pond Frogs, but this band broke up when Cook and others went to university. Heaton did not go to university, but held a number of office jobs, which would influence his later songwriting. After leaving Surrey, Heaton spent time hitch-hiking around Europe before moving to Hull in 1983.

Throughout his childhood, Heaton's main interest was football, and he regularly attends Sheffield United games. Heaton played over 700 competitive games at junior and amateur level, often insisting on driving back from gigs on a Friday or Saturday night to attend his Saturday and Sunday matches.

== The Housemartins ==
Heaton, then billing himself as P.d. Heaton, formed the Housemartins in 1983, initially with Stan Cullimore on guitar, before recruiting Ted Key on bass and Hugh Whitaker on drums. Norman Cook replaced Key in 1985, and Dave Hemingway replaced Whitaker in 1987.

The Housemartins released a number of singles and two studio albums, London 0 Hull 4 and The People Who Grinned Themselves to Death. Their most popular hit was an a cappella cover version of "Caravan of Love" (originally by Isley-Jasper-Isley), which reached number 1 on 16 December 1986, their only number 1 hit in the UK.

The Housemartins' lyrics were a mixture of Marxist politics and Christianity (the inner sleeve of London 0 Hull 4 contained the mantra "Take Jesus – Take Marx – Take Hope").

== The Beautiful South ==
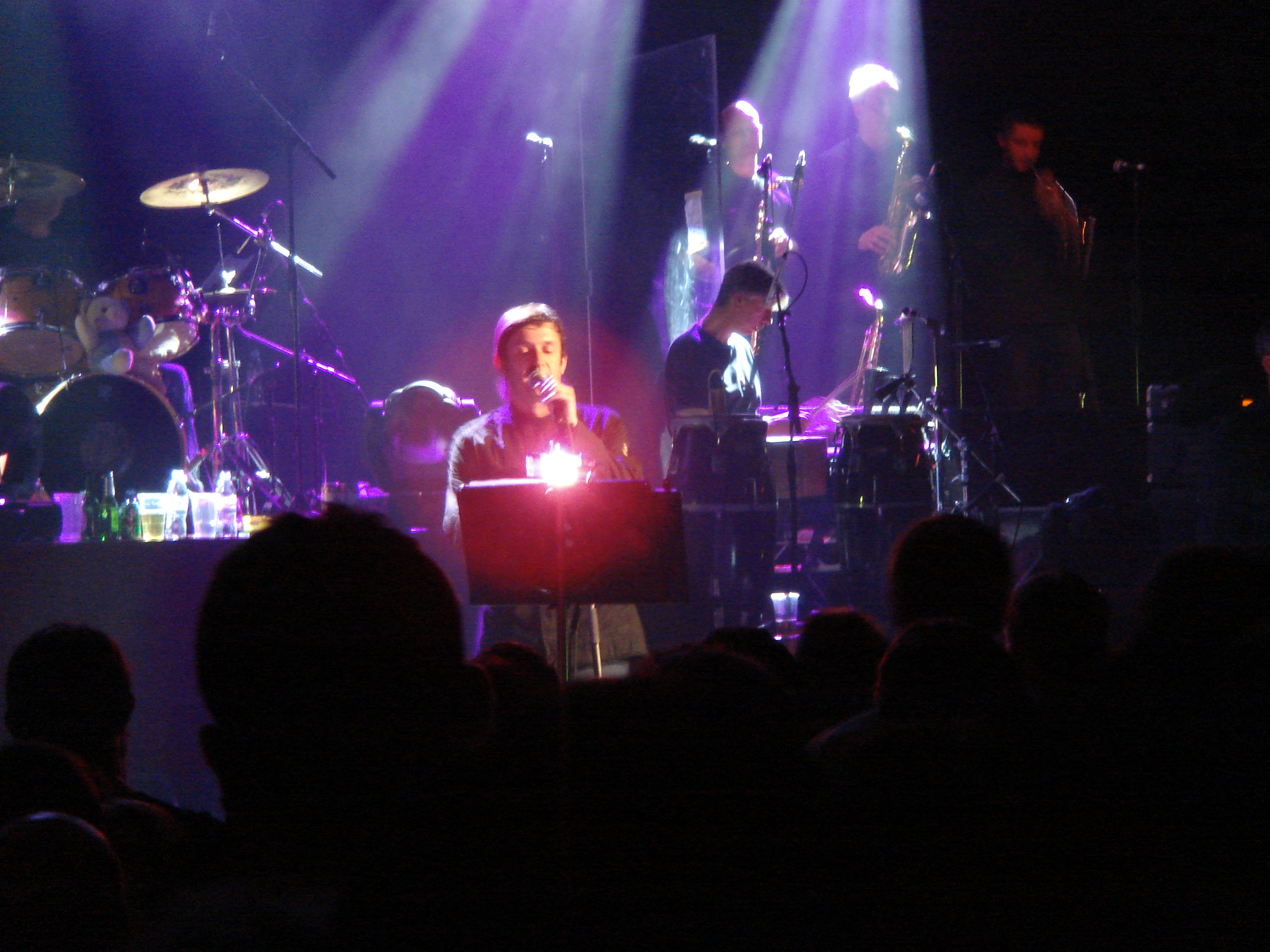
Heaton with the Beautiful South, 2006

In 1988, Heaton formed the Beautiful South. The initial lineup consisted of Heaton, Dave Rotheray on lead guitar, former Housemartins roadie Sean Welch on bass, David Stead on drums and Housemartins former drummer Dave Hemingway, now in the role of joint lead singer and frontman. The writing partnership of Heaton and Rotheray proved very successful. The Beautiful South released two top ten singles, "Song for Whoever" and "You Keep It All In"; the latter featured Irish singer Briana Corrigan on vocals. In 1989, the band released an album, Welcome to the Beautiful South. The band's biggest success to date is the single "A Little Time", released in 1990; it reached number 1 on the UK chart.

The band went on to release eight more albums, including two (1996's Blue Is the Colour and 1998's Quench) that reached the number 1 on the UK Albums Chart, as well as releasing the best-of compilation Carry on up the Charts, which also reached number 1 and achieved platinum status, before the band split up.

After a band meeting on 30 January 2007, they decided to split. They released a statement on 31 January, in which their reasons for splitting were "musical similarities".

== Solo albums ==
In 2001, Heaton released a solo album using the persona of Biscuit Boy (a.k.a. Crackerman). This double name, including the parenthetical a.k.a., was the official project name on all early releases.

The solo album, called Fat Chance, was not a commercial success, peaking at number 95 for one week on the UK albums chart. Also, "Mitch", the lone single credited to Biscuit Boy (a.k.a. Crackerman), reached only number 75 in the UK Singles Chart.

In an attempt to relaunch the album, Mercury Records re-issued Fat Chance in 2002. The album featured new artwork, and was now credited to Paul Heaton. However, this record charted even lower in the album chart, hitting number 168. "The Perfect Couple", a single pulled from this re-release also did poorly, peaking at number 102 in the UK. Heaton subsequently rejoined the Beautiful South from 2002 to 2007.

With the 2007 dissolution of the Beautiful South, Heaton formed a new band, The Sound of Paul Heaton.

Heaton's second solo album, The Cross Eyed Rambler, was released on 7 July 2008, preceded by the single "Mermaids and Slaves" on 30 June, and he toured in support of it throughout July. The album charted at number 43.

Heaton released his third solo album, Acid Country, in September 2010.

In August 2026 Heaton's LP Jenius became his first solo UK number one album.

== The 8th ==
In 2011, the Manchester International Festival endorsed the writing by Heaton of an anthology of songs based on the 7 deadly sins, to be called The 8th. The song was broken down into a section for each sin, which was to be performed by a different artist. The singers for the original piece were: Wayne Gidden, Aaron Wright, King Creosote, Simon Aldred, Jacqui Abbott, Yvonne Shelton and Mike Greaves. The individual sections were incorporated with a narration written by Che Walker and performed by Reg E. Cathey.

The 8th debuted in July 2011 at the Festival Pavilion Theatre in Manchester's Albert Square. Six further performances took place in the summer of 2012. Accompanying Heaton on the 2012 tour were various other artists including Gareth Paisey of Los Campesinos!, Christian Madden of the Earlies, Simon Aldred, and Steve Menzies.

Along with the live shows in July 2012, a recording of The 8th was released on a CD/DVD format, including tracks by Simon Aldred of Cherry Ghost, Aaron Wright, Mike Greaves, Yvonne Shelton, Jacqui Abbott and Heaton himself.

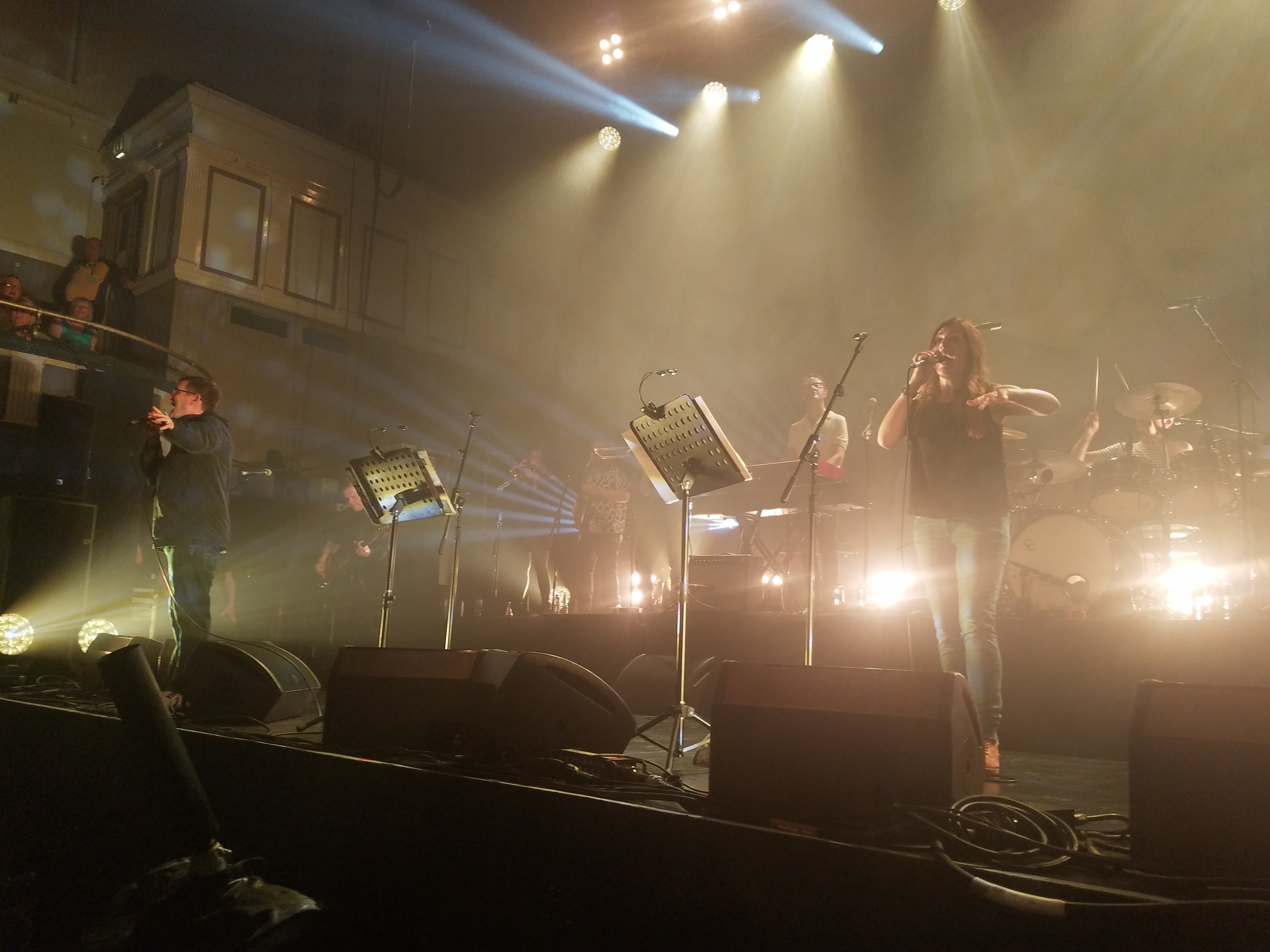
Paul Heaton and Jacqui Abbott performing live in Warrington England in June 2017

== Paul Heaton and Jacqui Abbott ==
Heaton reunited with former Beautiful South vocalist Jacqui Abbott in 2013 to record new material. What Have We Become? was released on 19 May 2014. The album reached number 3 in the UK Albums Chart. The album contained 12 new songs (the deluxe version an additional four new songs). The majority of the songs were written by Heaton and his current songwriting partner Jonny Lexus, with "D.I.Y", "When it Was Ours" and "You're Gonna Miss Me" written by Heaton only.

On working with Abbott again, Heaton said: "Working with Jacqui again was like going into your garage and discovering a beautiful, covered up Rolls-Royce that hadn't been started in years. Jacqui is one of the best singers I've worked with and is also part of my past. It was only a matter of time before I asked her."

On Sunday 29 June 2014 they appeared live on BBC Two at Glastonbury Festival performing acoustic versions of second single "Moulding of a Fool" and a cover version of Kenny Rogers and Dolly Parton's "Islands in the Stream". During the summer of 2014 Heaton and Abbott performed at a series of festivals across the UK and Ireland including Glastonbury Festival, Latitude Festival, V Festival and Festival N°6.

On 11 November 2014, BBC Radio 2 broadcast a world premiere of "Real Hope", featuring the Grimethorpe Colliery Band, from the deluxe edition of What Have We Become?.

Heaton and Abbott's next two albums together, Wisdom, Laughter and Lines (2015) and Crooked Calypso (2017), both reached the UK top 10, and their fourth, Manchester Calling (2020), became their first UK Number 1 album for over twenty years. They followed this up with a further UK Number 1 album, N.K-Pop in 2022 and a UK and Ireland arena tour, which included a night at the London O2 Arena. During the tour in December 2022, Abbott became ill which forced Heaton to continue the tour solo, before adding guest singers for the Ireland shows in early 2023 and his subsequent summer festival appearances.

Heaton performed together with Scottish singer Rianne Downey at TRNSMT 2023 and at Glastonbury Festival on 28 June 2024. A new album, The Mighty Several, produced by Ian Broudie, was released on the 11th of October 2024, consisting of 12 songs in the album, which then went on to reach Number 2 on the charts in the United Kingdom.

== The Last King of Pop ==
On 16 November 2018, a career-spanning collection of Heaton's music titled The Last King Of Pop was released on the Virgin EMI label. It featured 23 of the songs written by Heaton throughout his career in the Housemartins, The Beautiful South, his solo years, and his collaboration with Jacqui Abbott.

The track listing included the Housemartins' 1985 debut single "Flag Day", The Beautiful South's "Don't Marry Her", "Rotterdam" and "Perfect 10" through to 2017's Heaton & Abbott single "I Gotta Praise" + a 2018 re-record by Paul and Jacqui of the Beautiful South song "A Little Time", and a brand new song, entitled "7' Singles".

The album reached Number 10 in the UK Charts and was certified Gold on 11 January 2019.

To coincide with the album release, Heaton and Abbott performed three shows at Sheffield City Hall, Blackpool Empress Ballroom and London's Royal Albert Hall, performing the album in full.

Following the success of the shows, it was announced that Heaton and Abbott would perform The Last King Of Pop at an outdoor headline show at Stockport County's Edgeley Park on 21 June 2019. All 15,000 tickets sold out and a second night was announced to take place on 20 June 2019. Richard Hawley was announced as special guest at both shows.

A television documentary covering Paul Heaton's life and career was broadcast on Wednesday 12 December 2018 on Channel 4. The documentary included archived material and interviews with many key figures from throughout Heaton's life.

== Personal life ==
Heaton lives in Manchester with his wife and three children.

Heaton has on occasion referred to the Beautiful South as having a heavy-drinking culture. Many songs by the Beautiful South, such as "Woman in the Wall", "Liars' Bar", "I May Be Ugly", "The Slide", "Look What I Found in My Beer" and "Old Red Eyes Is Back", have referred to alcoholism or drink-fuelled violence.

In December 2011, Heaton purchased the lease of the King's Arms public house on Bloom Street in Salford. He sold the pub in December 2015.

Heaton is known for his diverse range of collections, which include football memorabilia, crisp packets, beer mats, shoe horns, postcards and comics.

== Other appearances ==
During the 1990s, Heaton regularly appeared on Football Italia, Channel 4's coverage of Italian Serie A football as a pre-match guest alongside host James Richardson.

Heaton appeared on BBC One talking head programme Why We Love the Royle Family, along with Noel Gallagher, in his capacity as a fan of the television sitcom The Royle Family.

In May 2012, Heaton set off on his 50:50 cycle tour of British and Irish pubs, promoting his latest album, British pubs, and cycling. He covered 2,500 miles (4,000 km) – 50 miles (80 km) for each year of his life.

In 2022, unable to do another cycling tour, he sent money to 60 pubs across the UK and Ireland to enable them to give free pints to celebrate his 60th birthday.

In February 2023, Heaton and his crisp packet collection appeared on the Channel 4 documentary Grayson Perry's Full English, with Heaton donating a display of Murphy's Crisps flavours to Perry's exhibition of Englishness.

== Discography ==
=== The Housemartins ===
- London 0 Hull 4 (1986)
- The People Who Grinned Themselves to Death (1987)
- Now That's What I Call Quite Good (1988)

=== The Beautiful South ===
- Welcome to the Beautiful South (1989)
- Choke (1990)
- 0898 Beautiful South (1989)
- Miaow (1994)
- Blue Is the Colour (1996)
- Quench (1998)
- Painting It Red (2000)
- Gaze (2003)
- Golddiggas, Headnodders and Pholk Songs (2004)
- Superbi (2006)

==== Compilations ====
- Carry on up the Charts (1994)
- Carry on up the Charts (1994) - 2CD Limited Edition
- Solid Bronze (2001)
- Gold (2006)
- Soup (2007)
- The BBC Sessions (2007) - 2-CD Set
- Live at the BBC (2011) - 3CD+DVD Set

=== Paul Heaton (solo artist) ===
==== Studio albums ====
- Fat Chance (2001) as Biscuit Boy (AKA Crackerman)
- The Cross Eyed Rambler (2008)
- Acid Country (2010)
- Paul Heaton Presents the 8th (2012)
- What Have We Become? (2014) with Jacqui Abbott
- Wisdom, Laughter and Lines (2015) with Jacqui Abbott
- Crooked Calypso (2017) with Jacqui Abbott
- Manchester Calling (2020) with Jacqui Abbott
- N.K-Pop (2022) with Jacqui Abbott
- The Mighty Several (2024) with Rianne Downey
- Jenius (2026) with Rianne Downey
