= Dream a Little Dream of Me =

Song composed by Fabian Andre and Wilbur Schwandt with lyrics by Gus Kahn

Song
- Genre: Vocal jazz; pop
- Composers: Fabian Andre; Wilbur Schwandt
- Lyricist: Gus Kahn

"Dream a Little Dream of Me" is a 1930 song with music by Fabian Andre and Wilbur Schwandt and lyrics by Gus Kahn. It was first recorded in February 1931 by Ozzie Nelson and his Orchestra, soon followed by Wayne King and his Orchestra with vocals by Ernie Birchill.

The song enjoyed its highest-charting success when it was covered in 1968 by Cass Elliot with the Mamas & the Papas, and followed the same year with a recording by Anita Harris. More than 400 other versions have been recorded, including by the Mills Brothers, Henry Mancini, the Beautiful South, Chicago, Anne Murray, Ella Fitzgerald, Erasure, and Michael Bublé.

While published in 1931, the song's earliest copyright was registered on December 29, 1930, and thus it entered the public domain on January 1, 2026.

== Background ==
Music producer Thom Donovan has described "Dream a Little Dream of Me" as both a lullaby and a love song, noting its “comforting, childlike quality.” The lyrics by Gus Kahn portray two lovers parting reluctantly, with one asking the other to remember them through dreams while asleep.

In 1930, a handwritten manuscript titled Dream a Little Dream of Me, dated January 6, 1930, and written in the hand of composer Milton Adolphus, documents the melody of the song prior to its commercial publication. Contemporary newspaper accounts report that Adolphus sold the song outright that year for $12.50, receiving no royalty interest.

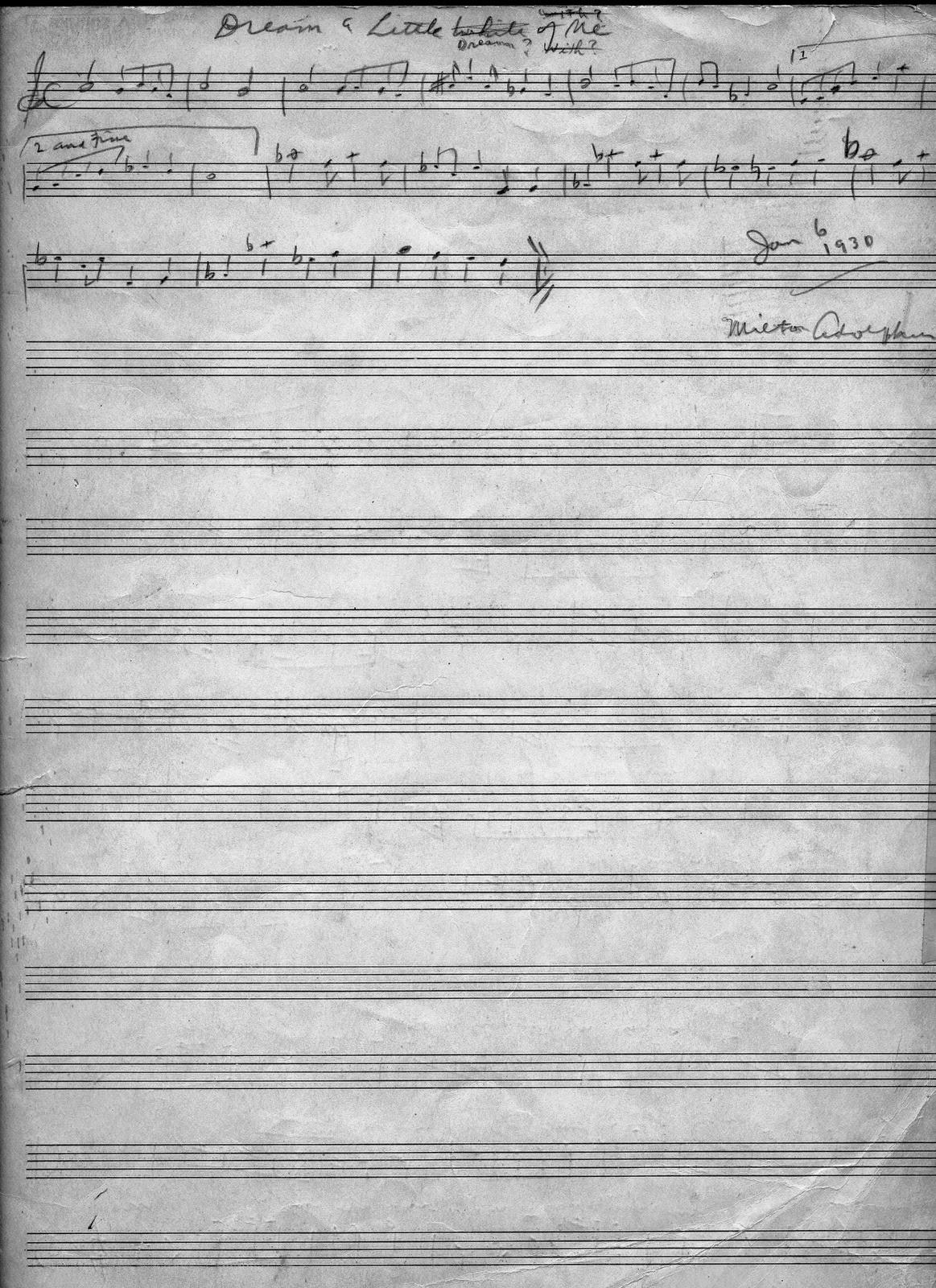
Handwritten musical manuscript titled Dream a Little Dream of Me, dated January 6, 1930, in the hand of Milton Adolphus.

The melody preserved in the manuscript corresponds to the later published version of the song. Adolphus did not receive formal songwriting credit when the song was subsequently registered and published, and he did not pursue ownership or attribution in later years. The song was later credited to Fabian Andre and Wilbur Schwandt as composers, with lyrics by Kahn, and went on to become a widely recorded popular standard.

Accounts from Andre and Schwandt indicate that the song entered the commercial publishing process during their touring activities in the Midwest in 1930. Schwandt gave differing recollections over time regarding the specific location where the melody was finalized, citing both Paw Paw, Michigan and Milwaukee in separate statements. As was common in the period, the song’s authorship and publication history reflects the informal and often fragmented practices of early twentieth-century popular music production, in which melodies circulated among performers and publishers before being formally registered.

== Early recordings ==
"Dream a Little Dream of Me" was recorded by Ozzie Nelson and his Orchestra, with vocals by Nelson in New York City, on February 16, 1931, for Brunswick Records. Two days later, Wayne King and his Orchestra, with vocals by Ernie Birchill, recorded the song for Victor Records. "Dream a Little Dream of Me" was also an early signature tune of Kate Smith.

In the summer of 1950, seven recordings of "Dream a Little Dream of Me" were in release, with the versions by Frankie Laine and Jack Owens reaching the US top 20, respectively at numbers 18 and 14; the other versions were by Cathy Mastice, Ella Fitzgerald with trumpet backing by Louis Armstrong, Louis Jordan, Vaughn Monroe, Dinah Shore, and a duet by Bob Crosby and Georgia Gibbs. Other traditional pop acts to record "Dream a Little Dream of Me" include Louis Armstrong, Barbara Carroll, Nat King Cole, Doris Day, Joni James, Dean Martin, and the Mills Brothers.

== The Mamas and the Papas version ==
"Dream a Little Dream of Me"
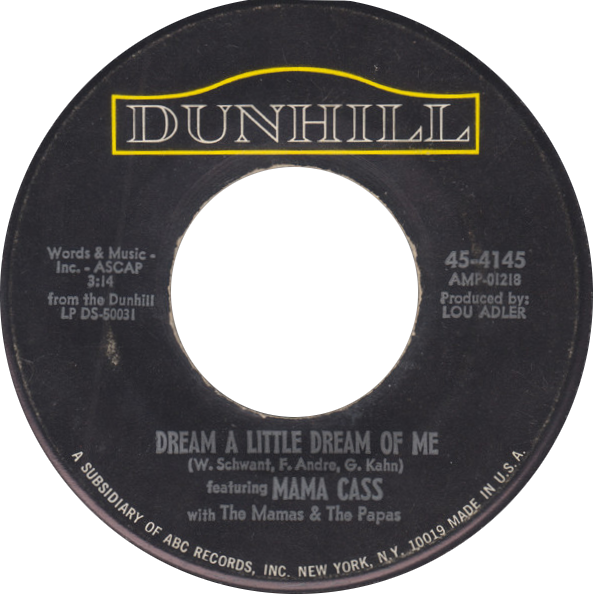
- One of side-A labels of the US single

Single by the Mamas & the Papas

from the album The Papas & the Mamas
- B-side: "Midnight Voyage"
- Released: June 1968
- Genre: Pop
- Length: 3:14
- Label: Dunhill
- Composers: Fabian Andre; Wilbur Schwandt
- Lyricist: Gus Kahn
- Producer: Lou Adler

The Mamas & the Papas singles chronology
"Safe in My Garden" (1968)	"Dream a Little Dream of Me" (1968)	"For the Love of Ivy" (1968)

Audio
- "Dream a Little Dream of Me" by Mama Cass with The Mamas & The Papas on YouTube

Performance video
- "Dream a Little Dream of Me" (from It's Lulu, July 25, 1970) by Cass Elliot on YouTube

"Dream a Little Dream of Me" was recorded for the Mamas & the Papas April 1968 album release The Papas & the Mamas with lead vocals by Cass Elliot. The group had often sung the song for fun, having been familiarized with it by member Michelle Phillips, whose father had been friends with the song's co-writer, Fabian Andre, in Mexico City, where Michelle Phillips' family had resided when she was a young girl. The song was recorded after the group heard about Andre's death; Philips recalled: "It was very shocking...we had never thought about [the song] again until we were all sitting around that day discussing his death, when we started to pick out the song...to see if we could remember the lyrics to it.

Cass Elliot suggested to group leader John Phillips that the group record "Dream a Little Dream of Me". According to him, she was unhappy while recording the song, objecting to its "campiness". Elliot herself, though, later told Melody Maker: "I tried to sing it like it was 1943 and somebody had just come in and said, 'Here's a new song.' I tried to sing it as if it were the first time." On the recording, Cass is heard in the introduction speaking in the background behind the acoustic guitar, mentioning a drink, and then Phillips gives an introduction ("And now, to sing this lovely ballad, here is Mama Cass."), as Cass clears her throat. Cass did her own whistling, which is heard before the song's fade.

Musically, early versions of the song consistently preserve the same tonal relationship between the main key and the bridge. The original manuscript by Milton Adolphus notates the song in C major, with the bridge modulating to A♭ major. The well-known Louis Armstrong recording transposes the song to G major, with the bridge moving to E♭ major, maintaining the same intervallic relationship found in the manuscript, and early published sheet music followed this key scheme. The Mamas and the Papas recording departs from this pattern: although it returns the song to C major, its bridge shifts to A major rather than A♭ major, raising the bridge by a semitone compared to earlier versions. This change necessitates a brief chromatic progression near the end of the bridge to reestablish the home key for the final section.

By the time of the album's release, strong indications has arisen that the Mamas and the Papas were set to disband, a perception strengthened by the failure of their recent single, "Safe in My Garden". Having an opportunity to promote the group's best-known member as a soloist, Dunhill Records gave a June 1968 single release to the "Dream a Little Dream of Me" track with the credit reading—to John Phillips' displeasure—"Mama Cass with the Mamas & the Papas"; on the UK release, the artist credit simply read "Mama Cass". Promoted in the US press and on billboards with a photograph of a discreetly, but obviously, nude Elliot lying in a bed of daisies, "Dream a Little Dream of Me" was their last major hit, peaking at number 12 on the Billboard Hot 100 that August (its Cash Box peak was number 10 and in Record World it reached number eight). The Billboard Easy Listening chart ranked the single as high as number two.

In the UK, "Dream a Little Dream of Me" reached number 11 that September; the track also afforded Mama Cass a hit in Ireland (number 13) and South Africa (number eight). In Australia, the Go-Set Top 40 chart ranked "Dream a Little Dream of Me" at number one for the weeks of 4 and 11 September 1968, and was the 16th-biggest hit of 1968.

A slightly different version of the song, with a different and longer intro and outro, was included on Elliot's debut solo album, Dream a Little Dream.

== Smothers Brothers appearance ==
Cass Elliot appeared on the Smothers Brothers Comedy Hour on September 29, 1968. She performed "Dream a Little Dream of Me" while in a bed with Tom Smothers, who is fooling around, trying to fall asleep and jolting awake and mugging for the camera.

Following a fashion retailers' TV commercial, the song was released as a single in Europe in 1992 – credited to the Mamas and the Papas and featuring that group's number-one hit "Monday, Monday" as the B-side – to reach number five in Germany and number 22 in Switzerland.

=== Chart performance ===
1968 weekly chart performance for "Dream a Little Dream of Me"
Chart (1968)	Peak position
Australia	1
Canada RPM Top Singles	7
Ireland	13
South Africa	8
UK Singles (Official Charts)	11
US Billboard Hot 100	12
US Billboard Adult Contemporary	2
US Cash Box Top 100	10
US Record World	8

1992 weekly chart performance for "Dream a Little Dream of Me"
Chart (1992)	Peak position
Germany	5
Switzerland	22

Year-end chart performance for "Dream a Little Dream of Me"
Chart (1968)	Position
Australia	14
Canada	72
UK	94
US (Joel Whitburn's Pop Annual)	105
US Cash Box	85

=== Certifications ===
Certifications for "Dream a Little Dream of Me"
Region	Certification	Certified units/sales
United States (RIAA)	Platinum	1,000,000^{‡}
^{‡} Sales+streaming figures based on certification alone.

== Anita Harris version ==
Anita Harris' version of "Dream a Little Dream of Me", recorded at Olympic Studios in a session produced by Mike Margolis with Alan Tew as musical director, was released 26 July 1968, the week prior to the US Top 40 debut of the Cass Elliot version. Harris would deny deliberately covering Elliot's "Dream a Little Dream of Me": (Anita Harris quote:)"I [loved] the song on the Mamas & Papas album...so I decided to record it...There were [then] no plans to release the other version [in the UK]. It was rushed out [here] when it was known that my version was coming out." Cass Elliot herself would deny any awareness of the UK single release of Harris' version.

Elliot's version had its UK release the week subsequent to Harris', with both versions debuting in the UK Top 50 dated 10 August 1968, Harris' version at #46 ahead of the Cass Elliot version at #49. However, the Elliot version would vault into the Top 30 and then Top 20 over the next two weeks while the Harris version would never reach the Top 30, although Harris's version of "Dream a Little Dream of Me" would maintain a lower chart presence throughout the ascendancy of the Elliot version, with Harris's single peaking at #33 the week after Cass's peak at #11.

== Enzo Enzo version ==
"Les Yeux ouverts"

Single by Enzo Enzo

from the album Enzo Enzo
- B-side: "Chanson confidentielle"
- Released: 1991
- Recorded: 1990
- Genre: Ballad; pop; jazz
- Length: 3:23
- Label: Ariola

Enzo Enzo singles chronology
"Pacifico" (1988)	"Les Yeux ouverts" (1991)	"Deux minutes de soleil en plus" (1991)

Audio
- "Les yeux ouverts" by Enzo Enzo on YouTube

In 1990, "Dream a Little Dream of Me" was covered in French-language with new lyrics by singer Enzo Enzo under the title "Les Yeux ouverts" (transl. French for "With Eyes Open"). Adapted from the original version by Brice Homs and Kurin Ternovtzeff, it was released in the first quarter of 1991 as the first single from the debut album Enzo Enzo, on which it is the third track, and became the well-known adaptation of the original song in this language.

=== Reception ===
A review in Pan-European magazine Music & Media praised the song stating: "Keep your eyes wide open, sings this French singer. Better keep your ears wide open, too, listening to cool jazz of this high calibre". Retrospectively, in 2021, Nathalie Lacube of French magazine La Croix wrote that "the singer's caressing voice and intimate phrasing worked wonders" on this song.

In France, the single debuted at number 49 on the SNEP chart edition of 23 March 1991, reached number 18 eleven weeks later and stayed in the top 50 for a total of 15 weeks. It charted for five non-consecutive weeks on the pan-European Hot 100 Singles compiled by Music & Media, peaking at number 87 on 8 June 1991. It was a moderate hit in Quebec, peaking at number 44 with a three-week chart run.

=== Track listings ===
- 7-inch single / 12-inch maxi / cassette
1. "Les Yeux ouverts" – 3:23
2. "Chanson confidentielle" – 3:42
- CD maxi
1. "Les Yeux ouverts" – 3:23
2. "Chanson confidentielle" – 3:42
3. "14e étage" – 3:16

=== Charts ===
Chart performance for "Les Yeux ouverts"
Chart (1991)	Peak position
Europe (European Hot 100)	87
France (Airplay Chart [AM Stations])	4
France (SNEP)	18
Quebec (ADISQ)	44

== Robbie Williams version ==
"Dream a Little Dream"

Single by Robbie Williams

from the album Swings Both Ways
- Released: 13 December 2013
- Genre: Swing; pop
- Length: 3:33
- Label: Island
- Composers: Fabian Andre; Wilbur Schwandt
- Lyricist: Gus Kahn
- Producer: Guy Chambers

Music video
- "Dream A Little Dream" by Robbie Williams on YouTube

English singer-songwriter Robbie Williams recorded "Dream a Little Dream of Me" (retitled "Dream a Little Dream") for his tenth studio and second swing album, Swings Both Ways (2013). While the album version is a duet with Lily Allen, she was omitted from the single version, which was released on 13 December 2013 as the album's second single.

=== Music video ===
The video features Williams singing the song whilst presenting a Christmas show in the style of The Dean Martin Show.

=== Track listings ===
- Irish digital download
1. "Dream a Little Dream" – 3:10
- German, Swiss, and Austrian digital download
1. "Dream a Little Dream" (single version) – 3:11
2. "You Got Old" – 3:43
3. "Puttin' on the Ritz" (remix) – 2:18

=== Charts ===
Chart performance for "Dream a Little Dream"
Chart (2013)	Peak position
Belgium (Ultratip Bubbling Under Flanders)	16
Belgium (Ultratip Bubbling Under Wallonia)	34
Denmark (Tracklisten)	18
France (SNEP)	160
Germany (GfK)	88
Switzerland (Schweizer Hitparade)	67
UK Singles (Official Charts Company)	144
UK Airplay (Music Week)	32

=== Release history ===
Release history and formats for "Dream a Little Dream"
Region	Date	Format	Label
Ireland	13 December 2013	Digital download	Island
Austria	13 December 2013	Digital download	Island
Germany	13 December 2013	Digital download	Island
Switzerland	13 December 2013	Digital download	Island

== Forestella version ==
In 2018, the South Korean crossover male vocal quartet Forestella published a cover on their album 'Evolution'

== Cover Versions ==
- Dean Martin covered the song for his 1959 album Sleep Warm
- The Beautiful South covered the song in the 1994 album “Carry On Up the Charts”
