= Wilbur Schwandt =

American musician (1904–1998)

- Born: Wilbur Clyde Schwandt; June 28, 1904; Manitowoc, Wisconsin, U.S.
- Died: July 23, 1998 (aged 94) Miami, Florida, U.S.
- Genres: Latin Jazz
- Occupations: Singer, composer/arranger, bandleader
- Label: Liberty Records

Wilbur Clyde Schwandt (June 28, 1904 – July 23, 1998) was an American musician, singer, composer and bandleader best known for his song "Dream a Little Dream of Me" with Fabian Andre and Gus Kahn. He frequently used the stage name Don Swan and released many Latin jazz albums in the 1950s and 1960s.

== Career ==
=== Composer ===
Wilbur Schwandz was born in Manitowoc, Wisconsin, on June 28, 1904, he studied composition at the University of Chicago and became an arranger for various big bands, including comedian Bob Hope's touring show. In 1940, he became an arranger for Xavier Cugat's orchestra, a position he would hold for the next 20 years. He was an arranger and composer for Latin lounge musicians such as Skinnay Ennis and Freddy Martin as well as Latin dance musicians such as Perez Prado and Desi Arnaz.

=== Singer ===
In the late 1950s Schwandt was signed to Liberty Records as a recording artist and recorded five Latin lounge LPs, beginning with Mucho Cha Cha Cha. Subsequent LPs like All This and Cha Cha Too, Hot Cha Cha, and two volumes of Latino! featured an all-star ensemble of west coast musicians. The success of his albums allowed Swan to form a touring group with whom he played extensively in New York City and Las Vegas.

Schwandt retired from music in the mid-1960s and eventually moved to Miami, Florida, where he died July 23, 1998, at the age of 94.
