= Fat Chance (album) =

Studio album by Paul Heaton
- Released: 10 September 2001
- Genre: Rock
- Length: 46:09
- Labels: Polygram International; Mercury Records
- Producers: Richard Flack, Scott Shields, Martin Slattery

Paul Heaton chronology
Fat Chance (2001)	Under the Influence (2004)

Professional ratings
Review scores
Source	Rating
Drowned In Sound	7/10 stars
The Guardian	3/5 stars

Fat Chance is the debut solo album by Paul Heaton, the former frontman of both The Housemartins and The Beautiful South, released in 2001 under the guise of Biscuit Boy (a.k.a. Crackerman). The album was rereleased the following year, complete with new artwork and crediting the artist as Paul Heaton.

The album was critically acclaimed, but was not a commercial success.

== Track listing ==
No.	Title	Writer(s)	Length
1.	"10 Lessons In Love"	Scott Shields, Martin Slattery, Paul Heaton	4:59
2.	"Mitch"	Heaton, David Rotheray	3:53
3.	"The Perfect Couple"	Heaton	3:54
4.	"Last Day Blues"	Damon Butcher, Heaton	3:57
5.	"Man's World"	Butcher, Heaton	4:53
6.	"Barstool"	Shields, Slattery, Heaton	4:07
7.	"Poems"	Shields, Slattery, Heaton	3:47
8.	"If"	Shields, Slattery, Heaton	3:56
9.	"The Real Blues"	Shields, Slattery, Heaton	5:51
10.	"Proceed With Care"	Shields, Slattery, Heaton	4:17
11.	"Man, Girl, Boy, Woman"	Heaton	2:28
Total length:			46:02

== Personnel ==
=== Musicians ===
- Paul Heaton – vocals (all tracks)
- Lauraine Macintosh – backing vocals (tracks 3, 8)
- Ricci P. Washington – backing vocals (tracks 3, 8, 9)
- Andrew Ross – brass (tracks 1, 4, 5, 9)
- Dominic Glover – brass (tracks 1, 4, 5, 9)
- Nichol D. Thomson – brass (tracks 1, 4, 5, 9)
- Scott Shields – drums, bass, backing vocals
- Jimmy Hogarth – guitar (tracks 3, 9)
- Damon Butcher – keyboards (tracks 4, 11)
- Martin Slattery – keyboards, guitar, flute, backing vocals
- Ged Lynch – percussion (tracks 1, 5)
- Pablo Cook – percussion (tracks 8, 11)
- Peter Barrow – scratches (track 7)
- Ellen Blair – strings (track 7)
- Jill Morley – strings (track 7)
- Marsha Skins – strings (track 7)
- Vicky Mathews – strings (tracks 4, 7)
- Duncan Mcay – trumpet (track 10)
- Beccy Byrne – vocals (track 6)
- Sharon Eusebe – vocals (track 3)
- Zoë Johnston – vocals (track 7)

=== Technical ===
- Martin Slattery – producer
- Scott Shields – producer
- Richard Flack – engineer, programming, producer
- Jon Kelly – executive producer
- Lawrence Watson – photography
- Tracy Worrall – illustration
- Ryan Art – design
