= Fabian Andre =

American composer (1910–1960)

Fabian Andre (January 8, 1910 – March 30, 1960) was an American composer and bandleader, best known for co-writing the music to the standard "Dream a Little Dream of Me" with Wilbur Schwandt in 1930. a popular standard in its time, introduced by Ozzie Nelson and His Orchestra, the song was revived in 1968 when covered by the Mamas & the Papas.

As an orchestra leader, he had a hit with the song "Dance of an Ear of Corn" for Columbia Records in July 1940. He released an album of rumbas for Fiesta Records in 1954.

== Death ==
In 1960, Andre was found dead in his hotel room in Mexico City. An autopsy determined the cause of death to be "alcoholic congestion". In 1968, the Mamas and the Papas decided to record "Dream a Little Dream of Me" after member Michelle Phillips heard that Andre, whom she met in her childhood, had supposedly died after falling down an elevator shaft.
