= Dave Stead =

British drummer (born 1966)

David Stead (born 15 October 1966), is a drummer from Huddersfield, Yorkshire, England. Stead was the drummer for the alternate pop / rock band, The Beautiful South.

After his parents separated, Stead moved with his mother and siblings to Cottingham, a village on the outskirts of Hull. He attended Cottingham High School, and following school worked as an electrical fitter for a few years, after which he was employed part-time as a sound engineer at the nearby alternative live music club, The Adelphi.

When sixteen-years-old he, with his older brother Mick, started the band The Luddites, with himself on drums and Mark Fell (1962–1984) on bass. The band released two singles, "Doppelganger" and "Altered States" on Eccentric Records. After The Luddites, Stead joined the band Vicious Circle. In August 1988 he joined The Beautiful South, playing on thirteen albums with the band.

Stead took over the Boars Nest restaurant in Princes Avenue, west Hull, converting it to the 'Union Mash Up' venue and restaurant. Following a July 2012 planning committee failure to add a bar licence for the venue Stead announced that he was closing the business.
