= The Beautiful South =

English pop group (1988–2007)

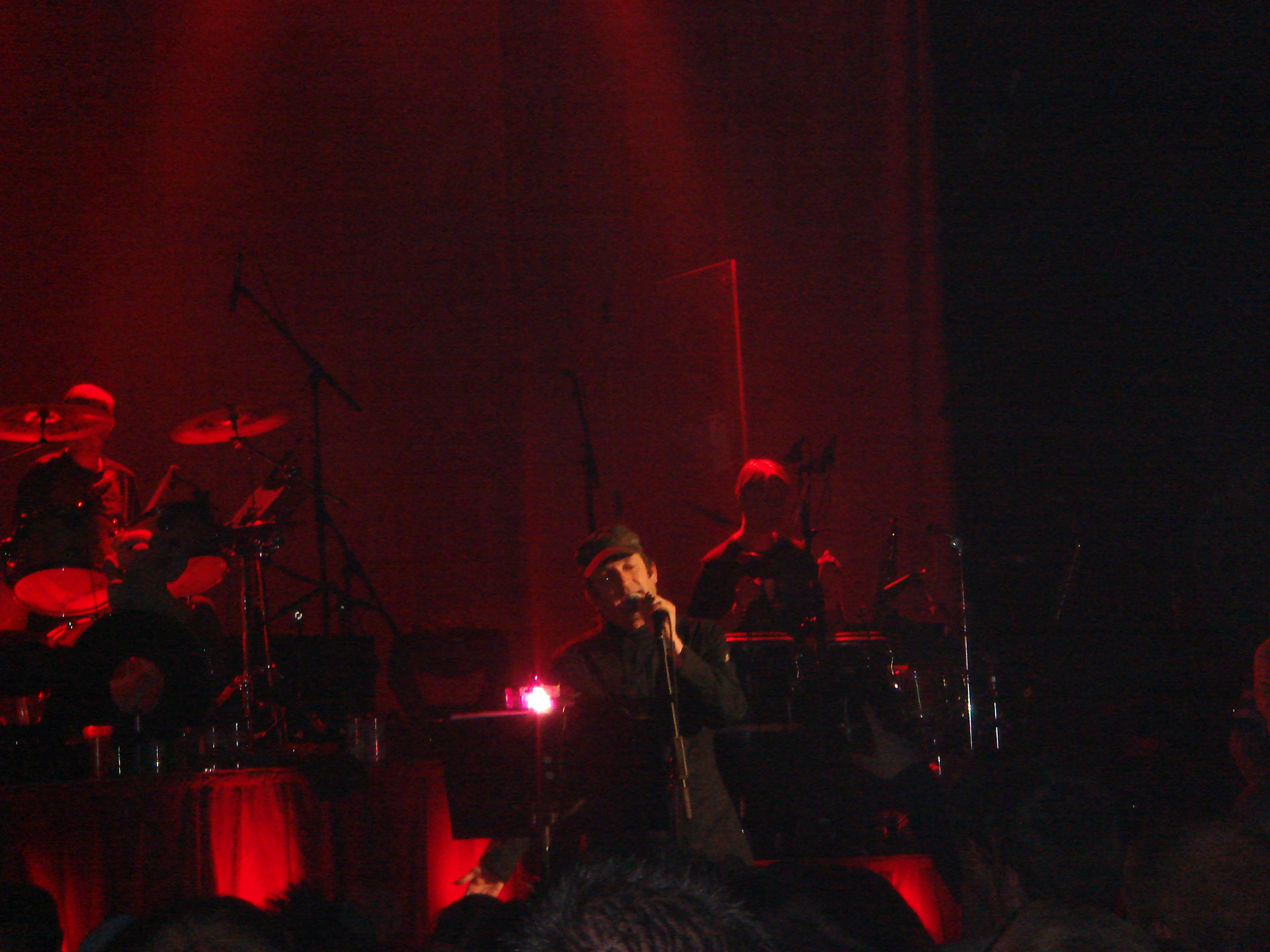
- The Beautiful South performing in 2006

Background information
- Origin: Hull, East Riding of Yorkshire, England
- Genre: Pop rock
- Years active: 1988–2007
- Labels: Go!, Ark 21, Mercury, London, Sony, Elektra
- Spinoff of: The Housemartins
- Past members: Paul Heaton; Dave Hemingway; Dave Rotheray; Dave Stead; Sean Welch; Briana Corrigan; Jacqui Abbott; Alison Wheeler

The Beautiful South were an English pop rock group formed in 1988 by former Housemartins members Paul Heaton and Dave Hemingway, both of whom performed lead and backing vocals. The other original members were guitarist Dave Rotheray, bassist Sean Welch, and drummer Dave Stead. All five original members remained with the band throughout its existence. The band's original material was written by Heaton and Rotheray.

After recording their first album, Welcome to the Beautiful South (1989), as a five-piece, they were joined by a succession of female vocalists; Briana Corrigan from 1990 to 1992, Jacqui Abbott from 1993 to 2000, and Alison Wheeler from 2003 to the band's split in 2007.

The group are known for wry and socially observant lyrics. They broke up in January 2007, saying the split was due to "musical similarities", having sold around 15 million records.

== History ==
=== 1988: Formation ===
Paul Heaton and Dave Hemingway had initially come to attention as (respectively) the lead singer and "singing drummer" of the successful Hull jangle pop band the Housemartins, who had scored seven UK Top 40 singles and two Top 10 albums between 1986 and 1988. (Heaton was with the Housemartins for their entire existence; Hemingway joined in time for their second and final album.) The band ended in 1988 at the height of its success. Heaton and Hemingway began work on setting up a new band, naming it "the Beautiful South" as a sarcastic comment on their staunch Northern roots.

The third initial bandmember was Dave Rotheray, a songwriting guitarist who had previously played with Hemingway in two other Hull bands, the Newpolitans and the Velvetones. At the time Rotheray was studying for a PhD at the University of Hull and living on Grafton Street, where Heaton also lived. Rotheray and Heaton became the songwriting team for the Beautiful South, which was conceived as a quintet with Heaton and Hemingway (who was no longer drumming) as the two lead singers. The core band was completed by Dave Stead (ex-Luddites/Vicious Circle) on drums, and former Housemartins roadie Sean Welch on bass guitar.

=== 1989: Welcome to the Beautiful South, addition of Corrigan ===
Their first album, Welcome to the Beautiful South, was released in 1989 and promptly produced a number two UK singles chart hit, "Song for Whoever". With the follow-up single "You Keep It All In" reaching number eight and "I'll Sail This Ship Alone" reaching number 31, the band were soon set to equal or surpass the success of the Housemartins, while the songwriting built on and expanded the trenchant social critiques which the previous band had been known for. Topics included nationalism, domestic violence, football hooliganism and the self-serving industry of love songs, and the album's disturbing cover art also drew attention. Northern Irish singer Briana Corrigan was featured as a background vocalist on the album. Her contributions proved so successful that she was soon promoted to full membership status, as the band's third vocalist.

=== 1990–91: Choke ===
In 1990, the Beautiful South released their second album, Choke. Two singles—"My Book" and "Let Love Speak Up Itself"—charted outside the Top 40, but the album also provided the band's only Number 1 hit, a Hemingway/Corrigan duet called "A Little Time". The video, featuring the aftermath of a domestic fight, won the 1991 BRIT Award for Best Video.

=== 1992: 0898 Beautiful South, Corrigan's departure ===
The band's third album, 0898 Beautiful South, followed in 1992. It provided another Top 20 hit, "Bell Bottomed Tear", as well as two further Top 30 hits, "Old Red Eyes Is Back" and "We Are Each Other", although a fourth single, "36D", only placed in the Top 50. "We Are Each Other" also became the band's biggest hit in the United States, peaking at No. 10 on the Billboard Modern Rock Tracks chart in 1992.

Both Choke and 0898 Beautiful South illustrated the growing fullness of the band's sound. Both featured Pete Thoms and Gary Barnacle as regular contributors on brass and woodwind, and also featured Corrigan as lead vocalist on several tracks. Her contribution helped to characterise the bittersweet kitchen sink dramas played out in the band's often barbed songs, and allowed Heaton and Rotheray to explore and express female perspectives in their songwriting. However, the latter approach had mixed success, demonstrated later in 1992 when Corrigan chose to leave the band to pursue a solo career. Although her decision was partly prompted by a desire to record and promote her own material (which was not getting exposure within the Beautiful South), she had also had ethical disagreements over some of Heaton's lyrics, most notably "Mini-correct", "Worthless Lie" and the 0898 Beautiful South single "36D", which criticised the British glamour industry via scathing comments about glamour models. Five years later, Hemingway admitted, "we all agree that we should have targeted the media as sexist instead of blaming the girls for taking off their tops". Heaton corroborated this view in 2022, stating, "'36D' hasn't dated well. I like the idea of blaming the newspapers, but blaming the model involved was wrong."

=== 1993: Abbot joins, Miaow ===
In 1993, St Helens supermarket shop-worker Jacqui Abbott was brought on board to fill in as the new third lead vocalist for the band. Heaton had heard her sing at an after-show party in St Helens and remembered her vocal talents. Heaton referred to her as "the lass from the glass"—a reference to the Pilkington factory in St Helens. Abbott's first album with the band was Miaow in the same year. Hits included "Good as Gold (Stupid as Mud)" and a cover of Fred Neil's "Everybody's Talkin'", previously popularised by Harry Nilsson.

=== 1994–95: Carry On Up the Charts ===
In November 1994 Carry On Up the Charts was released, a "best of" compilation consisting of the singles to date plus new track "One Last Love Song". Released at a time when the group's album sales had been waning, the album was a huge commercial success. It secured the Christmas number one spot on the charts and became the second-best selling album of the year. In 1995, the band briefly supported R.E.M. on the British leg of their world tour when they covered for Oasis, who pulled out of R.E.M.'s concerts at McAlpine Stadium in Huddersfield on 25 and 26 July. The Beautiful South performed Oasis' "Some Might Say", dedicating the song to Oasis fans in the audience.

=== 1996–97: Blue Is the Colour ===
The 1996 album Blue Is the Colour sold over a million copies, and featured hit singles "Rotterdam" and "Don't Marry Her". In 1997, the Beautiful South headlined stadium concerts for the first and last time, in Huddersfield and at Crystal Palace National Sports Centre in London. Support for the Huddersfield concert was provided by Cast and the Lightning Seeds.

=== 1998–99: Quench ===
The album Quench (1998) was released with similar commercial success, again reaching number one in the UK album charts. "Perfect 10", the first single to be released from the album, also provided the band with further singles chart success. The album is also notable for being more uptempo, and being the first on which Heaton and Hemingway's former Housemartins colleague Norman Cook (Fatboy Slim) was used in a consultancy role.

=== 2000: Painting It Red, Abbott's departure ===
Although 2000's Painting It Red album reached Number 2 in the UK charts, the band suffered difficulties in its promotion and in touring, and a substantial number of the CDs were faulty. Jacqui Abbott left the band in the same year, discouraged by the pressures of touring and needing to concentrate on looking after her son, who had just been diagnosed with autism.

=== 2001–02: Solid Bronze, band break, Heaton solo work ===
After completing their tour obligations, the band marked time with a second greatest-hits album, Solid Bronze, in 2001, and took time off to refresh themselves. Heaton embarked on a solo career under the alias "Biscuit Boy (a.k.a. Crackerman)" and released the Fat Chance album in 2001. It did not sell well, although it was critically acclaimed and was reissued under Heaton's own name the following year.

=== 2003–2005: Wheeler joins, Gaze and Golddiggas, Headnodders and Pholk Songs ===
The Beautiful South regrouped in 2003, with new recruit Alison Wheeler taking on the role of female singer. The lineup recorded Gaze in 2003, following it with 2004's Golddiggas, Headnodders and Pholk Songs, an album of unusually arranged cover tunes, including "Livin' Thing", "You're the One That I Want", "(Don't Fear) The Reaper" and "I'm Stone in Love With You". A track from the album, "This Old Skin", was presented as a cover of a song by an obscure band called "The Heppelbaums"; it was later revealed to be an original Heaton/Rotheray composition.

=== 2006: Superbi ===
The final Beautiful South album, Superbi, was released on 15 May 2006. The first single, "Manchester", started off as a poem—"If rain makes Britain great, then Manchester is greater"—and was, in Heaton's words, "a sodden tribute" to the city in which he now lived.

=== 2007–2013: Split, post-split projects ===
After a band meeting on 30 January 2007, the Beautiful South decided to split. They released a statement on 31 January 2007, in which they joked that their reasons for splitting were "musical similarities"—an ironic reference to "musical differences", which are often cited as the reason for a band's split. "The band would like to thank everyone for their 19 wonderful years in music", the statement said.

In June 2007, the band's music was featured in a jukebox musical entitled The Slide (the book is by Adrian Davis); it premiered at the Phoenix Theatre at New College, Swindon.

In 2009, band members Dave Hemingway, Alison Wheeler and Dave Stead joined with regular Beautiful South session musicians Damon Butcher, Gaz Birtles and Tony Robinson to form The South, performing the music of the Beautiful South. Stead dropped out after a short time, but the others were still part of the group in 2012 when they issued their debut album of original material, Sweet Refrains. Hemingway left The South at the end of 2016, but Wheeler and Birtles still tour regularly as the front members of the group.

In 2013, Paul Heaton reunited with former Beautiful South vocalist Jacqui Abbott to perform as Paul Heaton and Jacqui Abbott.

== Members ==
- Paul Heaton – vocals (1988–2007)
- Dave Hemingway – vocals (1988–2007)
- Dave Rotheray – guitar (1988–2007)
- Dave Stead – drums (1988–2007)
- Sean Welch – bass (1988–2007)
- Briana Corrigan – vocals (1989–1992)
- Jacqui Abbott – vocals (1993–2000)
- Alison Wheeler – vocals (2003–2007)

== Discography ==
- Welcome to the Beautiful South (1989)
- Choke (1990)
- 0898 Beautiful South (1992)
- Miaow (1994)
- Blue Is the Colour (1996)
- Quench (1998)
- Painting It Red (2000)
- Gaze (2003)
- Golddiggas, Headnodders and Pholk Songs (2004)
- Superbi (2006)
