= Dave Hemingway =

British musician (born 1960)

David Robert Hemingway (born 20 September 1960) is an English musician and songwriter, best known as a vocalist for the Hull based band The Beautiful South until they disbanded in 2007. Previously he had been a member of The Housemartins.

Hemingway was born in Hull, East Riding of Yorkshire, to Harry Hemingway, a lorry driver and local comedian on the club circuit, and Flo Hemingway, who was one of Hull's best-known barmaids. In Hull's Henry Cooper School, Hemingway was in the same class as The Housemartins' future drummer, Hugh Whitaker. The two shared an interest in drumming. Hemingway followed Whitaker into bands, first the Newpolitans with Dave Rotheray on bass, and then the Velvetones. Whilst at university in London, Hemingway was the drummer and a founding member of The Shoppers, a post-punk band.

His break came when he got a call from Rotheray telling him Whitaker had left The Housemartins. Rotheray recommended him to Housemartins guitarist Stan Cullimore, who phoned him. He was working as a purchase ledger clerk at the time for the Crystal Motor Group. Hemingway quit his job on 6 March 1987, and soon found himself in the studio, recording the band's second album, The People Who Grinned Themselves to Death.

After the Housemartins disbanded, he and Housemartins founder Paul Heaton put together The Beautiful South, featuring roadie and bassist Sean Welch.

Hemingway's first solo album, Hello Cruel World, was released as a download only on iTunes. The album's title was inspired by Hemingway's experience recording in the capital.

After forming The South in 2008, Hemingway joined Alison Wheeler from The Beautiful South to release their first album since 2006,Sweet Refrains. The album, featuring songs written by keyboardist Damon Butcher and guitarist Phil Barton, was recorded and released in 2012.

== Sunbirds ==
After leaving The South in 2017, Hemingway formed a new band called Sunbirds with former bandmate Phil Barton, drummer Marc Parnell and vocalist Laura Wilcockson. In 2020, Nectar Records released the first single by Sunbirds. Titled "Meet You on the Northside", the song is from the band's debut album, Cool to Be Kind.

== Bibliography ==
- Pattenden, Michael (1999) Last Orders at the Liars Bar. ISBN 0-575-06739-X
