= Sean Welch =

English bass guitarist (born 1965)

Sean Welch (born 12 April 1965, Enfield, England) is an English musician who was the bassist for The Beautiful South and previously roadie for The Housemartins.
