= Go! Discs =

British record label

- Parent company: Independent (1983–1996, 1999–present); Universal Music Group (1996–present; back catalogue)
- Founded: 1983; 1999 (relaunch)
- Founder: Andy Macdonald, Lesley Symons
- Defunct: 1996
- Status: Dormant
- Distributors: Chrysalis Records (1983–1996); Mercury Records UK (back catalogue, 1996–2013); Virgin EMI Records (back catalogue, 2013–2020); EMI Records (back catalogue, 2020–present)
- Genre: Various
- Country of origin: United Kingdom
- Location: Hammersmith, London

Go! Discs was a London-based record label, launched in 1983 from offices in Wendell Road, Shepherd's Bush, by Andy Macdonald and Lesley Symons. The pair founded the label after Macdonald left his job as press officer at Stiff Records, and Symons provided the seed funding. The first signing to the label was Billy Bragg and early releases also came from Sheffield band The Box and Hull band The Housemartins. Records by the latter's spin-off group The Beautiful South were subsequently issued. Key staff contributors, following a move to Hammersmith, included comedian Phill Jupitus and Cathal Smyth (Madness' Chas Smash). Go! Beat Records was launched as a subsidiary for artists like Beats International, Gabrielle and Portishead. In 1992, Paul Weller signed for the main Go! Discs label.

In 1996, Macdonald resigned when PolyGram acquired a majority stake in the label, which folded not too long afterward. However, Go! Discs' dance offshoot Go! Beat Records continued and became a unit in the PolyGram group. In 1999, Go! Discs was revived, but it is now in dormancy along with Go! Beat.

The Go! Discs catalogue now operates under EMI Records, a division of the Universal Music Group. It was rebranded from Virgin EMI Records in June 2020.

== Andy Macdonald and Independiente ==
After the purchase of Go! Discs by PolyGram, Andy Macdonald started Independiente Records and continued his involvement with the recording career of Paul Weller. Independiente is also the home of Travis, Roddy Frame, Embrace, So Solid Crew, Howling Bells and Malian desert blues band Tinariwen.

== Artists ==
- Anna
- Apollo Landing
- The Bathers
- The Bic
- The Beautiful South
- Billy Bragg
- The Blue Ox Babes
- Boothill Foot Tappers
- BUtterfield 8
- David Holmes
- Drugstore
- Father Father
- The Frank and Walters
- The Housemartins
- The La's
- Madness
- More Fire Crew (Lethal Bizzle, Ozzie B & Neeko)
- Paul Weller
- Platinum 45
- Portishead
- The Southernaires
- The Stairs
- Trashcan Sinatras

== See also ==
- List of record labels
