= David Rotheray =

English musician (born 1963)

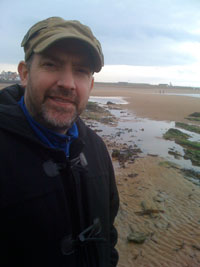
- Rotheray in 2010

Background information
- Born: David Rotheray; 9 February 1963 (age 63); Hull, East Riding of Yorkshire, England
- Genres: Indie pop, pop, alternative rock
- Occupations: Guitarist, songwriter
- Instrument: Guitar
- Years active: 1982–present
- Formerly of: The Velvetones (not the doo-wop group of the same name), the Newpolitans, The Beautiful South

David Rotheray (born 9 February 1963) is an English rock and pop musician, best known for being the lead guitarist of Hull band The Beautiful South.

Rotheray was born in Hull. His parents were both intellectuals and had met through the Young Communist League. Having much older brothers and sisters sped up his musical progress; by the age of 10 he was listening to rock and imagined being in a band. His chosen instrument at the time was the bass guitar. He has 4 siblings.

== Overview ==
Rotheray joined his first band when he was aged 13; it was called Mammoth, at one time performing the then-current Sex Pistols song, "Pretty Vacant" at a school concert, without any microphones. At that time Rotheray's musical tastes were for progressive rock, his favourite being Pink Floyd. His parents were worried but still allowed him to play and drove him to clubs to perform. Eventually, Mammoth evolved into a band called The Newpolitans. Both Mammoth and the Newpolitans featured Hugh Whitaker on drums, who later became the drummer for The Housemartins. The Newpolitans also later featured Dave Hemingway on drums, who also became drummer for the Housemartins and then a singer with the Beautiful South.

The Newpolitan style was a mixture of the current musical styles, from the Style Council to the Gang of Four. Band members included temporary additions, mainly for demo recordings, were saxophonist Kev Christian and the trumpet players Andrew Nicholson and Andy Russell. The Newpolitans recorded a self-financed single, but the failure of the single provided the catalyst for the band's demise. Rotheray and Hemingway then went on to form the Velvetones with other musician friends from Hull.

Whilst living on Grafton Street and studying for a PhD at Hull University, Rotheray met Paul Heaton with whom he formed the Beautiful South and began writing songs.

== Homespun ==
In 2001, Heaton released the album, Fat Chance. However, as the bulk of the tracks on Fat Chance were written by Heaton, or with collaborators other than Rotheray, it was decided that Rotheray too would have a side project whilst The Beautiful South were on a recording hiatus.

Homespun originally featured Rotheray and Sam Brown. The band released three albums. Brown was replaced by Helen 'Aitch' McRobbie as lead vocalist before Homespun split up in 2008. Rotheray concentrated on a solo project involving different singers from the contemporary scene.

=== Homespun – album discography ===
- Homespun (Classic Records, 2003)
- Effortless Cool (Musicvision, 2005)
- Short Stories from East Yorkshire (Active Media, 2008)

== The Life of Birds ==
Rotheray announced the release of his first 'solo' album, The Life of Birds for 16 August 2010, on the Proper Music label. Although ostensibly a solo effort, the record featured collaborations with ten different singer/songwriters including Alasdair Roberts, Jim Causley, Eliza Carthy and Camille O'Sullivan.

=== The Life of Birds – track listing ===
1. "The Sparrow and the Thrush and the Nightingale
2. "Living Before the War"
3. "The Road to the South"
4. "Crows, Ravens and Rooks"
5. "Draughty Old Fortress"
6. "Sweet Forgetfulness"
7. "The Hummingbird on Your Calendar"
8. "Taller Than Me"
9. "Almost Beautiful"
10. "Flying Lessons"
11. "The Best Excuse in the World (is The Truth)"
12. "The Digital Cuckoo"
13. "Cover Your Garden Over"
14. "The Sparrow and the Thrush and the Nightingale (Part II)"

Following its release in 2010, The Life of Birds was generally well received critically. In November 2010 and again in March 2011, Rotheray embarked on a tour, playing the album in full, with Jim Causley and Bella Hardy handling all the vocal duties. The live shows were also well received.

== Prosecco Socialist ==
In 2017, David Rotheray together with Eleanor McEvoy and Mike Greaves formed Prosecco Socialist with a single "This Dog's Just For Christmas Not For Life" in December and the album Songs From Behind Bars released in April 2018.

== Miscellaneous writing credits ==
- "Void" (Brown/Rotheray) – appeared on the Sam Brown EP, Ukulele and Voice (2006)
- "Quote I Love You Unquote" (Rotheray/McEvoy) – appeared on the Eleanor McEvoy album, Out There (2006)
- "Mitch" (Heaton/Rotheray) – appeared on the Paul Heaton album, Fat Chance (2002)
- "The Night May Still Be Young (But I Am Not)" (Rotheray/McEvoy) – appeared on the Eleanor McEvoy album, Love Must Be Tough (2008)
- "Old, New, Borrowed and Blue" (Rotheray/McEvoy) – also appeared on the Eleanor McEvoy album, Love Must Be Tough (2008)
- "The Ferry Boat Inn" (Heaton/Rotheray) – appeared on the Naomi Bedford album, Weeping Willow (2011)

== Bibliography ==
- Pattenden, Michael (1999); Last Orders at the Liars Bar. ISBN 0-575-06739-X
