= Paul Heaton discography =

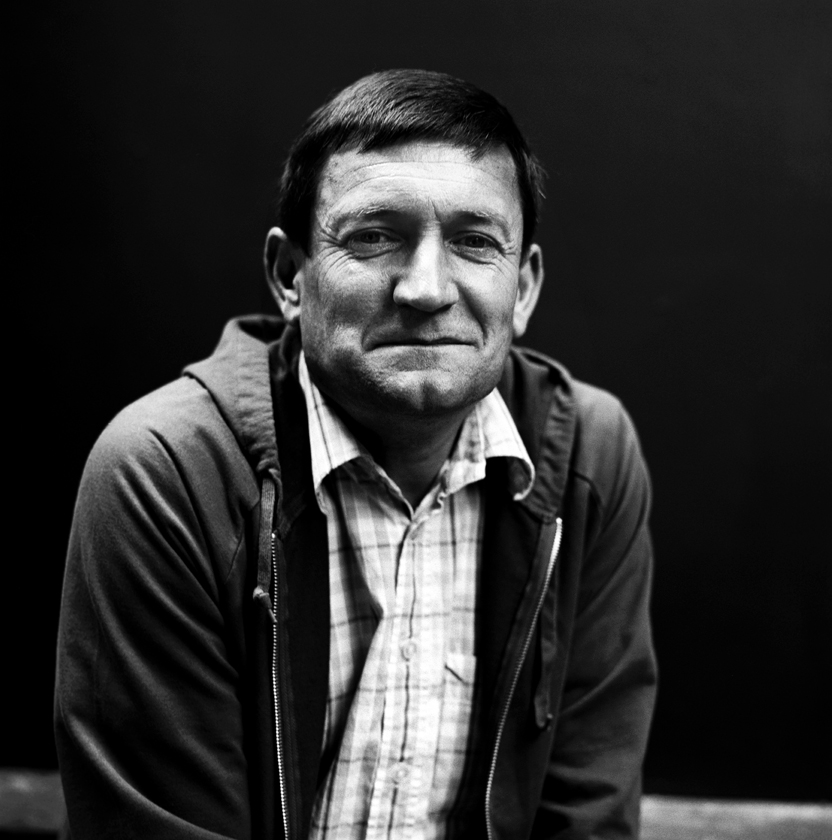
- Studio albums: 11
- Compilation albums: 1

The discography of Paul Heaton, a solo artist previously a member of The Housemartins and The Beautiful South, consists of eleven studio albums. Paul Heaton's first solo release was "Mitch", released under the banner of Biscuit Boy.

== Albums ==
=== Studio albums ===
Title	Details	Peak chart positions		Certifications
Title	Details	UK	IRE	Certifications
Fat Chance (As Biscuit Boy)	Released: 10 September 2001; Label: Mercury; Formats: CD, cassette, LP	95	—	
The Cross Eyed Rambler	Released: 7 July 2008; Label: W14 Music; Formats: CD, cassette, LP	43	—	
Acid Country	Released: 13 September 2010; Label: Proper Records; Formats: CD, cassette, LP	51	—	
Paul Heaton Presents the 8th	Released: 13 September 2012; Label: Proper Records; Formats: CD, cassette, LP	—	—	
What Have We Become? (with Jacqui Abbott)	Released: 12 May 2014; Label: Virgin EMI; Formats: CD, cassette, LP	3	26	BPI: Gold
Wisdom, Laughter and Lines (with Jacqui Abbott)	Released: 23 October 2015; Label: Virgin EMI; Formats: CD, cassette, LP	4	39	BPI: Silver
Crooked Calypso (with Jacqui Abbott)	Released: 21 July 2017; Label: Virgin EMI; Formats: CD, Cassette, LP	2	10	BPI: Silver
Manchester Calling (with Jacqui Abbott)	Released: 6 March 2020; Label: Virgin EMI; Formats: CD, LP	1	3	
N.K-Pop (with Jacqui Abbott)	Released: 7 October 2022; Label: EMI; Formats: CD, LP	1	4	
The Mighty Several	Released: 11 October 2024; Label: EMI; Formats: CD, LP	2	82	
Jenius	Released: 21 August 2026; Label: EMI; Formats: CD, LP	1	36	
"—" denotes a release that did not chart or was not released in that territory.

=== Compilation albums ===
Title	Details	Peak chart positions	
Title	Details	UK	IRE
Under the Influence	Released: 23 February 2004; Label: DMC; Formats: CD	—	—
The Last King of Pop	Released: 16 November 2018; Label: Virgin EMI; Formats: CD	10	51
"—" denotes a release that did not chart or was not released in that territory.

== Singles ==
Title	Year	Peak chart positions	Album
Title	Year	UK	Album
"Mitch" (As Biscuit Boy)	2001	75	Fat Chance
"The Perfect Couple"	2002	102	Fat Chance
"I Do"	2008	—	The Cross Eyed Rambler
"Little Red Rooster"	2008	—	The Cross Eyed Rambler
"Mermaids and Slaves"	2008	—	The Cross Eyed Rambler
"The Ladder's Bottom Rung"	2010	—	Acid Country
"The Old Radio"	2010	—	Acid Country
"Lust"	2012	—	Paul Heaton Presents the 8th
"DIY" (with Jacqui Abbott)	2014	75	What Have We Become?
"Moulding of a Fool" (with Jacqui Abbott)	2014	—	What Have We Become?
"When It Was Ours" (with Jacqui Abbott)	2014	—	What Have We Become?
"Real Hope" (with Jacqui Abbott)	2014	—	What Have We Become?
"The Austerity of Love" (with Jacqui Abbott)	2015	—	Wisdom, Laughter and Lines
"I Don't See Them" (with Jacqui Abbott)	2015	—	Wisdom, Laughter and Lines
"(Man Is) The Biggest Bitch of All" (with Jacqui Abbott)	2016	—	Wisdom, Laughter and Lines
"I Gotta Praise" (with Jacqui Abbott)	2017	—	Crooked Calypso
"She Got the Garden" (with Jacqui Abbott)	2017	—	Crooked Calypso
"He Wants To" (with Jacqui Abbott)	2017	—	Crooked Calypso
"You and Me (Were Meant to Be Together)" (with Jacqui Abbott)	2020	—	Manchester Calling
"Still" (with Jacqui Abbott)	2022	—	N.K-Pop
"Fish 'N' Chip Supper"	2024	—	The Mighty Several
"Quicksand" (with Rianne Downey)	2024	—	The Mighty Several
"—" denotes a release that did not chart or was not released in that territory.
