= Soup (The Housemartins and the Beautiful South album) =

Greatest hits album by The Housemartins and The Beautiful South
- Released: 2007
- Recorded: 1985–2003
- Genres: Indie rock, alternative rock, pop rock, jangle pop
- Length: 78:06
- Label: Mercury Records
- Producer: Various

The Housemartins chronology
Live at the BBC (2006)	Soup (2007)

The Beautiful South chronology
Superbi (2006)	Soup (2007)

Soup is an album released in November 2007 by The Housemartins and The Beautiful South on Mercury Records. It is in effect a greatest hits album for both of the bands, the first seven tracks bracketed together as "The Housemartins Condensed" and the remaining fifteen as "The Cream of The Beautiful South". All twenty-two songs were released as singles by the bands, and the track listing runs in chronological order by year of song release from 1985's "Flag Day" to 2003's "Just A Few Things That I Ain't". An associated DVD of the bands' music videos was also released.

== Background ==
The album came into being as two of The Housemartins, Paul Heaton and Dave Hemingway formed The Beautiful South upon the former's breakup in 1988. The Beautiful South therefore were seen as the next guise of The Housemartins. Both bands had already had two greatest hits albums: The Housemartins in 1988 (Now That's What I Call Quite Good) and 2004 (The Best of The Housemartins), and The Beautiful South in 1994 (Carry on up the Charts) and 2001 (Solid Bronze).

The sleeve of the album contains an introduction to it and a brief history of the band by long term friend and fan of the bands, journalist and radio DJ Stuart Maconie. It also contains artwork from throughout the bands' careers and gives the names of all the members of both bands throughout their duration.

== Reception ==
Professional ratings
Review scores
Source	Rating
Allmusic	3.5/5 stars

A BBC review of the album stated "Often misunderstood and overlooked by the barometer of cool, Heaton and his minions have beavered away nevertheless and become two of the finest exponents of pop Britain has ever had", while the Manchester Evening News declared "the early work shows them as being a jewel in our pop heritage."

== Chart performance ==
The album reached number 15 in the UK Albums Chart and was certified double platinum. It has sold over 841,629 copies in the UK as of August 2026.

== Track listing ==
The Housemartins Condensed

1. "Flag Day"
2. "Happy Hour"
3. "Think for a Minute"
4. "Caravan of Love"
5. "Five Get Over Excited"
6. "Me and the Farmer"
7. "Build"

Cream of The Beautiful South

8. "Song for Whoever"
9. "You Keep It All In"
10. "I'll Sail This Ship Alone"
11. "A Little Time"
12. "Old Red Eyes Is Back"
13. "36D"
14. "Good as Gold (Stupid as Mud)"
15. "Everybody's Talkin'"
16. "Prettiest Eyes"
17. "One Last Love Song"
18. "Rotterdam (Or Anywhere)"
19. "Don't Marry Her"
20. "Perfect 10"
21. "How Long's a Tear Take to Dry?"
22. "Just a Few Things That I Ain't"

== DVD Track listing ==
The Housemartins

1. "London 0 Hull 4" (Documentary)
2. "We Shall Not Be Moved" (The Tube 1986)
3. "We're Not Deep" (The Tube 1986)
4. Home Video From The '80s

The Beautiful South

5. "Bell Bottomed Tear" (The Late Show 1992)
6. "We'll Deal With You Later" (The Late Show 1992)
7. "Old Red Eyes Is Back" (Glastonbury Festival 1999)
8. "Don't Marry Her" (Glastonbury Festival 1999)
9. "Perfect 10" (Live at T In The Park 1999)
10. Home Video From The '80s

== Charts ==
=== Weekly charts ===
Chart (2007)	Peak position
Irish Albums (IRMA)	39
Scottish Albums (Official Charts)	14
UK Albums (Official Charts)	15

=== Year-end charts ===
Chart (2007)	Position
UK Albums (OCC)	58

== Certifications and sales ==
Region	Certification	Certified units/sales
United Kingdom (BPI)	2× Platinum	841,629
