= Now That's What I Call Quite Good =

Greatest hits album by The Housemartins
- Released: 9 May 1988
- Recorded: Various
- Genre: Indie rock
- Length: 78:39
- Label: Go! Discs
- Producer: Various

The Housemartins chronology
The People Who Grinned Themselves to Death (1987)	Now That's What I Call Quite Good (1988)	Live at the BBC (2006)

Professional ratings
Review scores
Source	Rating
AllMusic	link

Now That's What I Call Quite Good was the post-breakup greatest hits album from The Housemartins, released in 1988. As well as singles (such as the UK number one "Caravan of Love"), the compilation includes various album tracks, B-sides and radio session recordings. It includes many humorous liner notes from the band (for example, numerous sales and chart position statistics – but only from New Zealand).

== Track listing ==
1. "I Smell Winter" – 3:23 B-side of the "Think for a Minute" 12" single.
2. "Bow Down" – 3:01 From The People Who Grinned Themselves to Death.
3. "Think for a Minute!" – 3:29 Single version.
4. "There is Always Something There to Remind Me" – 3:30 John Peel Session 4/11/87. Released as a single.
5. "The Mighty Ship" – 1:50 B-side of the "Happy Hour" single/12".
6. "Sheep" – 2:16 From London 0 Hull 4.
7. "I'll Be Your Shelter (Just Like a Shelter)" – 4:46 Luther Ingram cover. B-side of the "Sheep" 12".
8. "Five Get Over Excited" – 2:41 from The People Who Grinned Themselves to Death.
9. "Everyday's the Same" – 2:56 1987 outtake.
10. "Build" – 4:48 from The People Who Grinned Themselves to Death.
11. "Step Outside" – 4:13 B-side of the "Me and the Farmer" 12".
12. "Flag Day" – 3:32 Original single version.
13. "Happy Hour" – 2:22 From London 0 Hull 4.
14. "You've Got a Friend" – 3:30 Carole King cover. Previously unreleased demo.
15. "He Ain't Heavy, He's My Brother" – 2:47 Kelly Gordon/The Hollies cover. Capital Radio Session 13/3/86.
16. "Freedom" – 3:27 Janice Long Session 6/11/85.
17. "The People Who Grinned Themselves to Death" – 3:30 From The People Who Grinned Themselves to Death.
18. "Caravan of Love" – 3:39 Isley-Jasper-Isley cover. Non-album single.
19. "The Light is Always Green" – 3:58 from The People Who Grinned Themselves to Death.
20. "We're Not Deep" – 2:15 From London 0 Hull 4.
21. "Me and the Farmer" – 2:54 From The People Who Grinned Themselves to Death.
22. "Lean on Me" – 4:27 From London 0 Hull 4.
23. "Drop Down Dead" – 3:01 John Peel Session 21/7/85.
24. "Hopelessly Devoted to Them" – 2:10 B-side of the "Five Get Over Excited" 12".

== Charts ==
Chart (1988)	Peak position
UK Albums (OCC)	8

== Certifications ==
Region	Certification	Certified units/sales
United Kingdom (BPI)	Gold	100,000^{^}
^{^} Shipments figures based on certification alone.
