= Longman Book Project =

Series of reading books for children

The 'Longman Book Project' was a series of English language children's fiction and non-fiction books, published by the British publishing company Longman. It was designed to fit the UK National Curriculum and aimed to support teachers in primary education.

== History ==
The Longman Book Project series was first published in 1994. Sue Palmer was overall series editor, Wendy Body was fiction editor and language consultant, and Bobbie Neate was non-fiction editor.

The Project aimed to coincide with the National Curriculum in England and Wales, the English 5-14 Guidelines in Scotland and the Northern Ireland Guidelines for English. The British Parliament passed the 1988 Education Reform Act, which outlined the framework for the National Curriculum structured around 'Key Stages' in core subjects English, mathematics and science. The 5-14 curriculum was introduced in Scotland 1991 and Northern Ireland first introduced a statutory curriculum in 1996.

The Longman Book Project was developed to teach and improve children's literacy and language skills through a range of fiction and non-fiction books that had activity resource worksheets and teaching materials with each, and as well as language skills textbooks.

A number of popular children's authors have written for the Longman Book Project including Malorie Blackman, Anne Fine, Jacqueline Wilson and Michael Rosen.

=== Structure ===
A standard structure for using the Longman Book Project in education was:

1. Early years (ages up to 6 years) - Fiction 1/2, Non-Fiction 1, and Language 1
2. 6–7 years - Fiction 3, Non-Fiction 2, and Language 2/3
3. 7–8 years - Fiction 4, and Language 3/4
4. 8–9 years - Fiction 6, Non-Fiction B, Plays 2
5. 9–10 years - Fiction 7/8/9/10, Non-Fiction B, and Plays 3/4
6. 10–11 years - Fiction 14/15/16
7. 11–12 years - Fiction 14/15/16

== Publications ==
=== Fiction ===
- (Beginner 1 Read-On) Ben Biggins' by Judith Nicholls, Longman, 1994, ISBN 9780582121034
- (Beginner 1 Read-On) Come In! by Wendy Body, Longman, 1994, ISBN 9780582124837
- (Beginner 1 Read-On) Come into the Garden! by Rod Campbell, Longman, 1994, ISBN 9780582121126
- (Beginner 1 Read-On) In the Box by Wendy Body, Longman, 1994, ISBN 9780582124844
- (Beginner 1 Read-On) Lisa's Letter by Michael Rosen, Longman, 1994, ISBN 9780582121164
- (Beginner 1 Read-On) Minnie Meets a Monkey by Pratima Mitchell, Longman, 1994, ISBN 9780582121898
- (Beginner 1 Read-On) Minnie's Kite by Pratima Mitchell, Longman, 1994, ISBN 9780582121904
- (Beginner 1 Read-On) The Monster Who Loved Telephones by John Agard, Longman, 1994, ISBN 9780582121829
- (Beginner 1 Read-On) Wake Up by John Mole, Longman, 1994, ISBN 9780582121911
- (Beginner 1 Read-On) Water, Water by John Mole, Longman, 1994, ISBN 9780582121928
- (Beginner 1 Read-On) What's That? by Wendy Body, Longman, 1994, ISBN 9780582124752
- (Beginner 1 Read-On) Where is the Snake? by Wendy Body, Longman, 1994, ISBN 9780582124769
- (Beginner 1 Read-On) Who am I? by Wendy Body, Longman, 1994, ISBN 9780582124882
- (Beginner 1, Read-Aloud) Ben Biggins' Socks by Wendy Body and Sue Palmer, Longman, 1994, ISBN 9780582123984
- (Beginner 1, Read-Aloud) Ben Biggins' Week by Wendy Body and Sue Palmer, Longman, 1994, ISBN 9780582123977
- (Beginner 1, Read-Aloud) Figgy Roll by Michael Rosen, Longman, 1998, ISBN 9780582335912
- (Beginner 1, Read-Aloud) Get Up, Webster! by Wendy Body and Sue Palmer, Longman, 1994, ISBN 9780582124110
- (Beginner 1, Read-Aloud) Hurry-up, Harry! by Heather Eyles, Longman, 1994, ISBN 9780582120990
- (Beginner 1, Read-Aloud) Mai Ling Plays Monsters by Wendy Body and Stan Cullimore, Longman, 1994, ISBN 9780582123809
- (Beginner 1, Read-Aloud) Mai-Ling's Castle by Wendy Body and Stan Cullimore, Longman, 1994, ISBN 9780582123823
- (Beginner 1, Read-Aloud) Mai-Ling's Friend by Wendy Body and Stan Cullimore, Longman, 1994, ISBN 9780582123847
- (Beginner 1, Read-Aloud) Minnie and the Champion Snorer by Pratima Mitchell, Longman, 1994, ISBN 9780582123656
- (Beginner 1, Read-Aloud) Snowflake by Michaela Morgan, Longman, 1994, ISBN 9780582121867
- (Beginner 1, Read-Aloud) Stop It, Webster! by Wendy Body and Sue Palmer, Longman, 1994, ISBN 9780582123946
- (Beginner 1, Read-Aloud) Tiger by Michaela Morgan, Longman, 1994, ISBN 9780582121874
- (Beginner 1, Read-Aloud) What's the Time Mai-Ling? by Wendy Body and Stan Cullimore, Longman, 1994, ISBN 9780582123816
- (Beginner 1, Read-On) Can I Play? by Wendy Body, Longman, 1994, ISBN 9780582124806
- (Beginner 1, Read-On) I Want to Be...by Wendy Body, Longman, 1994, ISBN 9780582124783
- (Beginner 1, Read-On) Not so Stupid! by Stan Cullimore, Longman, 1999, ISBN 9780582337213
- (Beginner 2) But Where Is Jack? (Book 11) by Wendy Brody, 1997, ISBN 9780582307971
- (Beginner 2) Can You Make A Bird? (Book 12) by Wendy Brody, Longman, 1997, ISBN 9780582307988
- (Beginner 2) Come and Play (Book 15) by Wendy Body, Longman, 1997, ISBN 9780582308015
- (Beginner 2) I Like to Play...(Book 16) by Wendy Body, Longman, 1997, ISBN 9780582308022
- (Beginner 2) I Like You (Book 7) by Wendy Brody, Longman, 1997, ISBN 9780582307933
- (Beginner 2) I Live Here (Book 3) by Wendy Brody, Longman, 1997, ISBN 9780582307896
- (Beginner 2) I Want That? (Book 9) by Wendy Brody, Longman, 1997, ISBN 9780582307957
- (Beginner 2) I Want To Be The Rabbit (Book 13) by Wendy Brody, Longman, 1997, ISBN 9780582307995
- (Beginner 2) It Wasn't Me (Book 14) by Wendy Body, Longman, 1997, ISBN 9780582308008
- (Beginner 2) Special Friends (Book 1) by Wendy Brody, Longman, 1997, ISBN 9780582307872
- (Beginner 2) What Do I Want? (Book 8) by Wendy Brody, Longman, 1997, ISBN 9780582307940
- (Beginner 2) What's in The Box? (Book 10) by Wendy Brody, Longman, 1997, ISBN 9780582307964
- (Beginner 2) Where Do You Live? (Book 4) by Wendy Brody, Longman, 1997, ISBN 9780582307902
- (Beginner 3) I Do, Too (Book 14) by Wendy Body, Longman, 1997, ISBN 9780582308404
- (Beginner 3) I Don't Want That! (Book 2) by Wendy Brody, Longman, 1997, ISBN 9780582308275
- (Beginner 3) I Like Red (Book 6) by Wendy Brody, Longman, 1997, ISBN 9780582308312
- (Beginner 3) In the Garden (book 15) by Wendy Body, Longman, 1997, ISBN 9780582308411
- (Beginner 3) Is She with You? (Book 11) by Wendy Brody, Longman, 1997, ISBN 9780582308374
- (Beginner 3) It's Time for Bed (Book 7) by Wendy Brody, Longman, 1997, ISBN 9780582308329
- (Beginner 3) Jake's Poem Book (Book 5) by Wendy Brody, Longman, 1997, ISBN 9780582308305
- (Beginner 3) Let's Make A Cake (Book 11) by Wendy Brody, Longman, 1997, ISBN 9780582308381
- (Beginner 3) Let's Play with My Dog (Book 13) by Wendy Brody, Longman, 1997, ISBN 9780582308398
- (Beginner 3) Megan Went to Bed (Book 16) by Wendy Body, Longman, 1997, ISBN 9780582308428
- (Beginner 3) One and One Make Two! (Book 10) by Wendy Brody, Longman, 1997, ISBN 9780582308367
- (Beginner 3) One Duck (Book 9) by Wendy Brody, Longman, 1997, ISBN 9780582308343
- (Beginner 3) One for You (Book 8) by Wendy Brody, Longman, 1997, ISBN 9780582308336
- (Beginner 3) What are you making? (Book 3) by Wendy Brody, Longman, 1997, ISBN 9780582308282
- (Beginner 1, Read Aloud) The Toy Shop by Wendy Body, Longman, 1997, ISBN 9780582315808
- (Beginner 1, Read-Aloud) Ben Biggins' Playtime by Wendy Body and Sue Palmer, Longman, 1994, ISBN 9780582123953
- (Fiction 2, New Readers) BJ Dog by Stan Cullimore, Longman, 1994, ISBN 978-0582121188
- (Fiction 2, New Readers) Blue Moo by Geraldine mcCaughrean, Longman, 1994, ISBN 9780582121645
- (Fiction 2, New Readers) Crazy Crocs by Malorie Blackman, Longman, 1994, ISBN 9780582122086
- (Fiction 2, New Readers) Good Dog by Geraldine McCaughrean, Longman, 1994, ISBN 9780582121652
- (Fiction 2, New Readers) Gregorie Peck by Geraldine McCaughrean, Longman, 1994, ISBN 9780582121638
- (Fiction 2, New Readers) Henry Seamouse by Sam MacBratney, Longman, 1994, ISBN 9780582121249
- (Fiction 2, New Readers) Jug Ears by Jean Ure, Longman, 1994, ISBN 978-0582121584
- (Fiction 2, New Readers) Rachel and the Difference Thief by Malorie Blackman, Longman, 1994, ISBN 9780582121522
- (Fiction 2, New Readers) Rachel versus Bonecrusher the Mighty by Malorie Blackman, Longman, 1994, ISBN 9780582121515
- (Fiction 2, New Readers) Seagull Sweaters by Jenny Hamlett, Longman, 1994, ISBN 9780582121508
- (Fiction 2, New Readers) The Bumbles by Mark Ezra, Longman, 1994, ISBN 9780582121263
- (Fiction 2, New Readers) The Sand Tiger by Jenny Hamlett, Longman, 1994, ISBN 978-0582121690
- (Fiction 2, New Readers) The Shadow Dance by Martin Waddell, Longman, 1994, ISBN 9780582121942
- (Fiction 2, New Readers) The Smuggler's of Mourne by Martin Waddell, 1994, ISBN 978-0582121959
- (Fiction 2, New Readers) Trouble for Letang and Julie by Beverley Naidoo, Longman, 1994, ISBN 978-0582121560
- (Fiction 3, Independent Readers) Bertie's Uncle Basil by Mark Ezra, Longman, 1994, ISBN 9780582122307
- (Fiction 3, Independent Readers) BJ Goes on Holiday by Stan Cullimore, Longman, 1994, ISBN 978-0582122208
- (Fiction 3, Independent Readers) Camping Paradiso by Jenny Oldfield, Longman, 1994, ISBN 9780582122338
- (Fiction 3, Independent Readers) Gracie by Carolyn Sloan, Longman, 1994, ISBN 978-0582122154
- (Fiction 3, Independent Readers) I Thought I Heard a Goldfish Singing...by Leon Rosselson, Longman, 1994, ISBN 978-0582122413
- (Fiction 3, Independent Readers) Rajo and Raja by Lisa Dass, Longman, 1994, ISBN 9780582122161
- (Fiction 3, Independent Readers) Return of Archibald Gribbet by Adele Geras, Longman, 1994, ISBN 9780582122239
- (Fiction 3, Independent Readers) Toby and Other Tales by Primrose Lockwood, Longman, 1994, ISBN 9780582122130
- (Fiction 3, Independent Readers) Trollop and Crunch by Sally-Ann Lever, Longman, 1994, ISBN 9780582121980
- (Fiction 3, Literature and Culture) Dolphin's Daughter by Alma Alexander Hormic, Longman, 1995, ISBN 9780582122109
- (Fiction 3, Literature and Culture) Escape from Everytown by Terence Dicks, Longman, 1995, ISBN 9780582122024
- (Fiction 3, Literature and Culture) Fantastico by Nicholas Fisk, Longman, 1994, ISBN 9780582122352
- (Fiction 3, Literature and Culture) Grandfather Singh Stories by Pratima Mitchell, Longman, 1995, ISBN 9780582122185
- (Fiction 3, Literature and Culture) Harriet's Turn by Jan Mark, Longman, 1994, ISBN 978-0582122437
- (Fiction 3, Literature and Culture) Poor Me One by Grace Hallworth, Longman, 1995, ISBN 978-0582122079
- (Fiction 3, Literature and Culture) Sally and the Booted Puss by Ann Jungman, Longman, 1994, ISBN 9780582122031
- (Fiction 3, Literature and Culture) Tales from the Wonderland by Dennis Hamley, Longman, 1995, ISBN 9780582122376
- (Fiction 3, Literature and Culture) The Golden Ring by Agnes S.P. Szudek, Longman, 1994, ISBN 9780582122291
- (Fiction 3, Literature and Culture) The Man with No Shadow by Michael Rosen, Longman, 1995, ISBN 978-0582122000
- (Fiction 3, Literature and Culture) Watcher at the Window by Catherine Storr, Longman, 1995, ISBN 9780582122215

=== Plays ===
- (Fiction 2, New Readers) Plays 1 by Wendy Body and Sue Palmer, Longman, 1995, ISBN 978-0582130296
- (Fiction 2, New Readers) Plays 2 by Wendy Body and Sue Palmer, Longman, 1995, ISBN 978-0582130302
- (Fiction 2, New Readers) Plays 3 by Wendy Body and Sue Palmer, Longman, 1995, ISBN 978-0582130319
- (Fiction 2, New Readers) Plays 4 by Wendy Brody and Sue Palmer, 1995, ISBN 9780582130326
- (Fiction 12) Captain Stardust and the Space Pirates by David Orme, Longman, 2000, ISBN 9780582427907
- (Fiction 3, Literature and Culture) Celebrity Chicken (Play) by Anne Fine, Longman, 1995, ISBN 978-0582122482

=== Non-Fiction ===
- (Non-Fiction 1) Baby Equipment by Bobbie Neate, Longman, 1994, ISBN 9780582122642
- (Non-Fiction 1) Baby Food by Bobbie Neate and Susan Henry, Longman, 1994, ISBN 9780582122659
- (Non-Fiction 1) Dolls Now and Long Ago by Carole Beaty, Longman, 1994, ISBN 9780582122857
- (Non-Fiction 1) Growing Up in Canada by Eleanor and Bobbie Neate, Longman, 1999, ISBN 9780582358171
- (Non-Fiction 1) Has it Gone Off? by Ann Langran and Mark Nutting, Longman, 1994, ISBN 9780582122918
- (Non-Fiction 1) How Babies Grow by Bobbie Neate and Susan Henry, Longman, 1999, ISBN 9780582339545
- (Non-Fiction 1) Kitchens Now and Long Ago by Sallie Purkis, Longman, 1994, ISBN 9780582122611
- (Non-Fiction 1) Miner's Home by Anne Witherington, Longman, 1994, ISBN 9780582122833
- (Non-Fiction 1) Robin Redbreasts and Their Young by Colin Milkins and Bobbie Neate, Longman, 1999, ISBN 9780582358867
- (Non-Fiction 1) Toads and Their Young by Colin Milkins and Robbie Neate, Longman, 1999, ISBN 9780582358874
- (Non-Fiction 1) Water in the House by Sue Palmer and Ron Murphy, Longman, 1994, ISBN 9780582122635
- (Non-Fiction 1) What Babies Wore by Anne Witherington and Bobbie Neate, Longman, 1994, ISBN 9780582122673
- (Non-Fiction 2) Bacteria and Viruses by Carol Bryan and Bobbie Neate, Longman, 1999, ISBN 9780582352957
- (Non-Fiction 2) School in a Desert by Diana and Mohamed Al-Mawed, Longman, 1994, ISBN 9780582124585
- (Non-Fiction 2) School on an Island by Elizabeth Pryse, Longman, 1994, ISBN 9780582123120
- (Non-Fiction 2) The Brain by Iain Gilmour and Tony Head, Longman, 1999, ISBN 9780582352940
- (Non-Fiction 2) The Fridge by Dave Bryne and Mike Wheeler, Longman, 1994, ISBN 9780582123175
- (Non-Fiction 2) Tudor Clothes by Fiona Reynoldson, Longman, 1999, ISBN 9780582352971
- (Non-Fiction 2) Victorian Bathrooms by Fiona Reynoldson, Longman, 1994, ISBN 9780582123236
- (Non-Fiction 2) Victorian Clothes by Fiona Reynoldson, Longman, 1994, ISBN 9780582122987
- (Non-Fiction 2) Why Fabrics Can Fly by Mary Schoeser, Longman, 1994, ISBN 9780582122994
- (Non-Fiction 2) Why Jumpers are Woolly by Mary Schoeser, Longman, 1994, ISBN 9780582123021
- (Non-Fiction 2) Why Leggings are Lyrca by Mary Schoeser, Longman, 1994, ISBN 9780582123007
