= Live at the BBC (The Housemartins album) =

Live album by The Housemartins
- Released: 2006
- Recorded: 1985–1987
- Genres: Alternative rock, indie rock
- Label: Universal Music

The Housemartins chronology
Now That's What I Call Quite Good (1988)	Live at the BBC (2006)	Soup (2007)

Live at the BBC is a compilation album of live tracks recorded for the BBC between 1985 and 1987 by The Housemartins. While most of the tracks included are session versions recorded for various BBC radio shows, the disc also features a number of cuts from the band's performances at the 1986 Glastonbury Festival and in Nottingham in 1987, as broadcast on the BBC.

The album features sleevenotes written by the band's former press officer and compere, Phill Jupitus, and serves as a companion to the previously released BBC session tracks included on the 1988 compilation album Now That's What I Call Quite Good. With the exception of track 1, "Drop Down Dead", all of the recordings included on the disc are exclusive to this album.

== Track listing ==
1. "Drop Down Dead" – 3:00
2. "Flag Day" – 3:34
3. "Stand at Ease" – 2:54
4. "Reverends Revenge" – 1:34
5. "Shelter" – 3:22
6. "People Get Ready" – 1:39
7. "Over There" – 2:54
8. "Caravan of Love" – 4:40
9. "Happy Hour" – 2:32
10. "Heaven Help Us All" – 3:16
11. "Pickin' the Blues (Peel Show Theme Tune)" – 0:51
12. "Mercy" – 2:58
13. "So Glad" – 1:53
14. "He Brought Me Out" – 2:07
15. "Sunday Isn't Sunday" – 2:06
16. "Build" – 4:35
17. "We're Not Deep" – 2:24
18. "Me and the Farmer" – 2:58
19. "The People Who Grinned Themselves To Death" – 3:21
20. "The Light Is Always Green" – 3:51
21. "The World's on Fire" – 3:04
22. "We're Not Going Back" – 2:35
23. "Johannesburg" – 3:47
24. "Five Get Over Excited" – 4:44
- Tracks 1–3 were recorded live for the John Peel Show, 21 July 1985.
- Track 4 was recorded live for the Janice Long Show, 6 November 1985.
- Tracks 5–6 were recorded live on Saturday Live, 4 January 1986.
- Tracks 7–8 were recorded live for the John Peel Show, 6 April 1986.
- Tracks 9–11 were recorded live for the John Peel Show, 3 June 1986.
- Tracks 12–14 were recorded live for the Janice Long Show, 11 December 1986.
- Tracks 15–16 were recorded live for the John Peel Show, 3 November 1987.
- Tracks 17–18 were recorded live at the Glastonbury Festival June 1986 and broadcast on 29 November 1986.
- Tracks 19–24 were recorded live at the Royal Centre, Nottingham, 30 September 1987.
