= There Is Always Something There to Remind Me =

1988 single by The Housemartins

Single by The Housemartins

from the album Now That's What I Call Quite Good
- B-side: "Get Up Off Our Knees (Live, BBC, 30.09.1987)"
- Released: April 1988
- Genre: Indie rock
- Label: Go! Discs
- Songwriters: Paul Heaton, Stan Cullimore

The Housemartins singles chronology
"Build" (1987)	"There Is Always Something There to Remind Me" (1988)

"There Is Always Something There to Remind Me" is the final single released by British indie rock band The Housemartins. An unfavourable account of Paul Heaton's schooldays akin to The Smiths' "The Headmaster Ritual", the non-album single was released in April 1988 as a 7" and a 12" and reached No. 35 in the singles chart.

A video was made for the single featuring the band members dressed as school teachers. It was filmed at the Bishop Douglass School in Finchley, Greater London.

The single cover artwork was designed by Paul Warhurst, the bass player with The Gargoyles, another Hull-based band which has previously included Housemartins Hugh Whitaker and Ted Key. Warhurst died in 2003.

== Charts ==
Chart (1988)	Peak position
Italy Airplay (Music & Media)	17
