= Percy (band) =

English post-punk band

Background information
- Origin: York, England
- Genres: Post punk; Punk rock; Pop punk; Indie pop; New wave music
- Years active: 1996–present
- Labels: Ten Foot Records, Mook Records, Vinyl Eddie Records
- Members: Colin Howard; Andrew Wiles; Jason Wilson; Paula Duck
- Past members: Phil Garlick; Hugh Whitaker; Jon Betz; Fil Charters; Geoff Cousins; Dan Whiting
- Website: percyband.uk

Percy are an English post-punk band from York, England, formed in 1996. The band is known for having drummer Hugh Whitaker, as a member of the band from 1997 to 2004, and for their single "Donny Rednecks", which featured in Steve Lamacq's 'Single of the Week' column in Melody Maker in 1999.

== History ==
=== Early history ===
The band was started in York in early 1996 by principal songwriter guitarist Colin Howard and bass player Andrew Wiles. Both of these remain members to this date.

After a few local gigs in 1996 the band went into the studio to record a demo with the first drummer, Phil Garlick. The engineer for that recording was electronic composer Tim Wright, who continues to collaborate with the band to this day. That demo was circulated on cassette in November 1996. The demo scored very highly (96/100) and led to the track Youth Awareness Week being included in a CD release, which in turn led to radio airtime on BBC Radio Scotland's Beat Patrol in 1998.

=== The Hugh Whitaker era ===
In 1997, Percy recruited ex-Housemartins member Hugh Whitaker. It was this line-up that released two of their most iconic singles.

West Yorkshire Super Heroes, released in June 1998, was again recorded in collaboration with Tim Wright. Percy formed their own label, Tenfoot Records, to release the single, although it was distributed with assistance from Overground Records.

In spring 1999 the band were signed to Mook Records of Leeds on a single album deal. In December 1999, a single was released ahead of the album featuring the tracks Donny Rednecks and S.B.O.T.Y. Donny Rednecks was aired on BBC Radio 1's The Evening Session in the run-up to the release, and was Steve Lamacq's single of the week on 15 December 1999. The B-side track, Small Businessman of the Year (SBOTY), was preferred by Scottish Radio 1 DJ Vic Galloway, who included it in his personal record bag. The release was delayed until early 2000 due to import problems.

The album was never released, but another three-track single Caravan (with Being Human and King of California) was released on CD in October 2001. Although this last single was also given air time on Radio 1, this single was their last collaboration with Mook Records under the original deal and it became apparent that the wind was out of the band’s sails and momentum was failing.

In 2002, Hugh Whitaker expressed a wish to eventually leave the band, and they parted ways in 2005.

=== The Nielsens ===
In June 2008, Colin Howard and Andy Wiles decided to write and play live again they but there was a feeling that it would be difficult to perform again as Percy without Hugh. From a small ad they found a young drummer in Harrogate with a love of Funk and Jazz. With his input the new material was quite up beat and a gigs were booked in Leeds under the name The Nielsens. Promoters instead listed the band playing as The Nielsens (Percy) and it was evident that the small die hard following wanted the old band back. The old name was restored in 2010, sometimes referred to as Percy Mk2.

=== Percy (Mk2) ===
Recruiting a replacement for Hugh Whitaker proved a challenge which dogged the Nielsens, and was only resolved by rotating the lineup. Andy replaced Hugh, Colin took over from Andy, opening the position for a new lead guitarist – Geoff Cousins. This arrangement didn't last, and soon Dan Whiting (owner of a local recording studio) replaced Andy on drums, allowing the other two to return to their initial roles. The new lineup proved successful, with Tom Robinson returning the band to the airwaves on his BBC Radio 6 Music shows BBC Music Introducing Mixtape and the Tom Robinson Show – both part of the BBC Music Introducing series. This led to more radio airtime on BBC Radio 6, BBC Radio 1Xtra and local radio stations.

The group's first album, A Selection of Salted Snacks, was released in 2013.

In 2016, Dan Whiting left the band to concentrate on running the recording studio.

=== Percy (Mk3) ===
In 2017, the current lineup was formed with synth player Paula Duck and drummer Jason Wilson, and the band diversified from the punk-pop genre that had characterised the Percy Mk2 years.

The group's second album Sleepers Wake was released in November 2018 on their old label Mook Records of Leeds. This is the first release on Mook Records since the single 'Caravan' came out in 2001.

In late 2019, were offered the opportunity to record and release a new vinyl album on Vinyl Eddie Records of York. This 10 track album Seaside Donkeys was recorded in November 2019 at Crooked Room Studios in York and was released in 2020.

Recording activities stalled due to the pandemic but the band came back with a new album "Monorail" in June 2022. This received their first review in the magazine Vive le Rock (rated 7/10). The follow up album "New Phase" in May 2024 has also been well received including by Louder than War stating "Brimming with ideas, imagination and spontaneity, this is an album touched by genius with just a hint (ok, make that a dollop) of madness thrown into the mix..."

== Discography ==
=== Singles and EPs ===
- 1996 "Settled" / "You and Me"
- 1998 "West Yorkshire Super Heroes" EP – Ten foot Records
- 1999 "Donny Rednecks" single – Mook Records
- 2001 "Caravan" single – Mook Records
- 2011 "Big Fellas" Single – Ten foot Records
- 2011 "A New Kind of Discipline" Single – Ten foot Records
- 2013 "Anthem for a Doomed Youth" EP – Ten foot Records
- 2014 "King of California" Single – Ten foot Records
- 2018 "West Yorkshire Super Heroes" EP – Ten foot Records iTunes anniversary reissue
- 2020 "Seaside Donkey" / "Love Song" Single – Ten foot Records
- 2020 "Will of the People" Single – Ten Foot Records
- 2022 "ICU" Single – Ten Foot Records
- 2023 "Last Train to Selby" Single – Ten Foot Records

=== Albums ===
- 2013 A Selection of Salted Snacks – Ten Foot Records
- 2018 Sleepers Wake – Mook Records
- 2020 Seaside Donkeys – Vinyl Eddie Records
- 2022 Monorail – Ten Foot Records
- 2024 New Phase – Ten Foot Records

== Line up ==
Percy (Mk1)				The Nielesens	Percy (Mk2)		Percy (Mk3)
1996-1997	1997-2001	2001-2005	2005-2008	2008-2010	2010-2012	2012-2016	2017-present
Colin Howard (Guitar; Vocals; Keyboard)			Dormant	Colin Howard (Guitar; Vocals; Keyboard)	Colin Howard (Bass; Vocals)	Colin Howard (Guitar; Vocals)	
Andy Wiles (Bass)			Dormant	Andy Wiles (Bass)	Andy Wiles (Drums)	Andy Wiles (Bass; Vocals)	
Phil Garlick (Drums)			Dormant				
	Hugh Whitaker (Drums; Vocals)		Dormant				
		Jon Betz (Rhythm; Guitars)	Dormant				
			Dormant	Fil Charters (Drums; Percussion; Samples)			
			Dormant		Geoff Cousins (Guitar; Vocals)		
			Dormant			Dan Whiting (Drums)	
			Dormant				Jason Wilson (Drums)
			Dormant				Paula Duck (Synth)
