= Quench (album) =

Studio album by the Beautiful South
- Released: 12 October 1998
- Genres: Alternative rock, pop rock, jazz
- Length: 52:42
- Label: Go! Discs
- Producers: Paul Heaton, Jon Kelly

The Beautiful South chronology
Blue Is the Colour (1996)	Quench (1998)	Painting It Red (2000)

Singles from Quench
- 1. "Perfect 10" Released: 21 September 1998; 2. "Dumb" Released: December 1998; 3. "How Long's a Tear Take to Dry?" Released: 8 March 1999; 4. "The Table" Released: July 1999

Professional ratings
Review scores
Source	Rating
AllMusic	3/5 stars
Christgau's Consumer Guide	(1-star Honorable Mention)
The Encyclopedia of Popular Music	3/5 stars
The New Rolling Stone Album Guide	3/5 stars
PopMatters	6.7/10

Quench is the Beautiful South's sixth album, released in the UK on 12 October 1998. Including the compilation Carry On Up The Charts, it was the band's third album in a row to reach the top of the charts.

The cover depicts a boxer painted by Scottish painter Peter Howson. Commissioned for the album, the original painting can be seen in the Ferens Art Gallery, Hull. After the band cropped the image and used it in merchandise and promotional material, Howson took legal action against the band, receiving around £30,000 in damages. Whilst the first two singles from the album also have artwork by Howson, "How Long's a Tear Take to Dry?" and "The Table" do not.

== Singles ==
- "Perfect 10" - released August 1998, UK Singles Chart pos.- No. 2,
- "Dumb" - released November 1998, UK Singles Chart pos.- No. 16,
- "How Long's a Tear Take to Dry?" - released March 1999, UK Singles Chart pos.- No. 12,
- "The Table (feat. The London Community Gospel Choir)" - released June 1999, UK Singles Chart pos.- No. 47.

== Track listing ==
All songs written by Paul Heaton and Dave Rotheray

1. "How Long's a Tear Take to Dry?" 4:35
2. "The Lure of the Sea" 3:57
3. "Big Coin" 4:11
4. "Dumb" 3:44
5. "Perfect 10" 3:38
6. "The Slide" 5:03
7. "Look What I Found in My Beer" 3:33
8. "The Table" 3:07
9. "Window Shopping for Blinds" 4:05
10. "Pockets" 4:59
11. "I May Be Ugly" 3:40
12. "Losing Things" 3:27
13. "Your Father and I" 5:05

== B-sides ==
As was their usual modus operandi, The Beautiful South included unreleased material on the B-sides of the singles taken from their albums.

from the "Perfect 10" CD1

- "Perfect 10"
- "If"
- "I'll Sail This Ship Alone" (performed by the East Yorkshire Motor Services Band)

from the "Perfect 10" CD2

- "Perfect 10"
- "Loving Arms" (Tom Jans)
- "One Last Love Song" (performed by the East Yorkshire Motor Services Band)

from the "Dumb" CD1

- "Dumb"
- "Suck Harder"
- "Especially for You" (performed by the East Yorkshire Motor Services Band, sleeve lists "Blackbird on the Wire")

from the "Dumb" CD2

- "Dumb"
- "I Sold My Heart to the Junkman" (Leon René)
- "Blackbird on the Wire" (performed by the East Yorkshire Motor Services Band, sleeve lists "Especially for You")

from the "How Long's a Tear Take to Dry?" CD1

- "How Long's a Tear Take to Dry?"
- "How Long's a Tear Take to Dry?" (Remix)
- "Perfect 10" (Acoustic)

from the "How Long's a Tear Take to Dry?" CD2

- "How Long's a Tear Take to Dry?"
- "Big Coin" (Acoustic, live on BBC Radio 1's The Mark Goodier Show)
- "Rotterdam" (Acoustic with Paul Heaton on vocals, recorded for BBC Radio 2 and UK Arena's songwriter circle 'In the Round' Dec. 2, 1998.

from "The Table" CD1

- "The Table" (featuring the London Community Gospel Choir)
- "Old Red Eyes Is Back" (Acoustic)
- "Your Father and I" (Recorded live at The Forum, London in 1998 for BBC Radio 2)

from "The Table" CD2

- "The Table" (featuring the London Community Gospel Choir)
- "Don't Marry Her" (Acoustic)
- "Look What I Found in My Beer" (Acoustic)

All the acoustic tracks were recorded for BBC Radio 2 and UK Arena's songwriter circle 'In the Round' Dec. 2, 1998.

== Personnel ==
The Beautiful South

- Paul Heaton - vocals
- Dave Hemingway - vocals
- Jacqui Abbott - vocals
- Dave Rotheray - guitar
- Sean Welch - bass
- Dave Stead - drums

with:

- Damon Butcher - keyboards
- Gary Hammond - percussion
- The Kick Horns - brass
- The London Community Gospel Choir - backing vocals "The Slide"
- Paul Weller - additional guitar "Perfect 10"

== Charts ==
=== Weekly ===
Chart (1998–99)	Peak position
German Albums (Offizielle Top 100)	26
Swedish Albums (Sverigetopplistan)	58
Swiss Albums (Schweizer Hitparade)	28
UK Albums (Official Charts)	1

=== Year-end ===
Chart (1998)	Position
European Albums (Music & Media)	91
UK Albums (OCC)	14
Chart (1999)	Position
UK Albums (OCC)	85

== Certifications and sales ==
Region	Certification	Certified units/sales
United Kingdom (BPI)	3× Platinum	969,358
