= Keep It in the Family =

Keep It in the Family may refer to:

== Books and theatre ==
- Keep It in the Family, a 1967 play by Bill Naughton
- Keep It in the Family, a 1996 children's book by Anne Fine
- Keep It in the Family, a 2022 thriller novel by John Marrs

== Film and television ==
- Keep It in the Family (film), a 1973 film starring John Gavin
- Keep It in the Family (1971 TV series), a 1971 British television comedy
- Keep It in the Family (1980 TV series), a 1980s British sitcom
- Keep It in the Family (British game show), a 2010s British game show
- Keep It in the Family (American game show), a 1950s American game show
- "Keep It in the Family" (Doctors), a 2003 television episode
- "Keep It in the Family", an episode of Leave it to Charlie

== Music ==
- Keep it in the Family, a 1974 album by Leon Haywood, and the title track
- "Keep It In The Family", a 1982 song by Deodato from Happy Hour
- "Keep It in the Family", a 1990 song by Anthrax from Persistence of Time
- "Keep It in the Family", a 2006 song by Hybrid from I Choose Noise
- Keep It In The Family, a 2021 mixtape by Kal Banx
