= Happy Hours =

Happy Hours may refer to:

- Happy Hours (film), an upcoming American romantic dramedy film
- Happy Hours (TV series), an Indian Hindi comedy television series
- Happy Hours, a song by The Reklaws from the album Good Ol' Days

== See also ==
- Happy Hour (disambiguation)
