= London 0 Hull 4 =

Studio album by The Housemartins
- Released: June 1986
- Studios: Strongroom Studios, London
- Genres: Indie rock; jangle pop
- Length: 46:55
- Label: Go! Discs
- Producer: John Williams

The Housemartins chronology
London 0 Hull 4 (1986)	The People Who Grinned Themselves to Death (1987)

London 0 Hull 4 is the debut album by The Housemartins, released in June 1986. It contains the singles "Flag Day" (#124 UK), "Sheep" (#54 UK), "Happy Hour" (#3 UK) and "Think for a Minute" (#18 UK).

The title refers to the band's home city of Kingston upon Hull and is in the format of a football score. It also refers to singer Paul Heaton's assertion that the Housemartins were only the fourth best band in Hull, suggesting London had no great bands at all. The other three Hull bands in question were Red Guitars, Everything but the Girl and The Gargoyles. The title "London 0 Hull 4" was used by various newspapers as a headline in October 2008 after the city's newly promoted football team, Hull City, beat West Ham United to take a fourth win out of four against London-based clubs (having previously beaten Fulham, Arsenal and Tottenham Hotspur).

The liner notes and lyrics reflect Heaton's interest at that time in Christianity and Marxism. For example, the back cover of the album contains the message, "Take Jesus – Take Marx – Take Hope".

The CD release of the album featured four additional tracks along with the front cover phrase, "16 songs – 17 hits!".

The album was re-released on 22 June 2009, as London 0 Hull 4 Deluxe, containing a second CD of bonus tracks, B-sides and live recordings.

== Critical reception ==
Professional ratings
Review scores
Source	Rating
AllMusic	4.5/5 stars
Christgau's Record Guide	A−
Mojo	3/5 stars
Number One	4/5 stars
Q	3/5 stars
Record Collector	4/5 stars
Record Mirror	5/5
The Rolling Stone Album Guide	4/5 stars
Smash Hits	9 1/2/10
Sounds	4.5/5 stars

Reviewing London 0 Hull 4 for Smash Hits, Sylvia Patterson called the Housemartins "quite possibly the brightest band in Britain", while Stuart Bailie raved in Record Mirror that "they have four ace singers, an ear for a good tune, articulate lyrics and loads of humour; all this might sound old-fashioned, yet it works every time." Dave Henderson commented in Sounds that the band "write good songs, but better still they deliver these songs with the kind of style that Kenneth Williams would gasp at. The Housemartins play Pop, and it counts." Henderson added that "they have that kind of Brit charm and wit that makes them marketable – but underneath they have a few well-penned home truths impregnated for good measure. Whether the message gets through or not is debatable, but the intention is right on the nose nevertheless." NME reviewer Adrian Thrills felt that "if it doesn't quite capture the exuberance of one of their inspiring live sets and is occasionally marred by moments of lyrical naivety, it remains one of the most accomplished debuts of the year."

Retrospectively, AllMusic critic Rick Anderson described London 0 Hull 4 as an album of "deceivingly simple and tuneful pop songs" masking "a world of class resentment, bitter economic disappointment, and strangled rage" in its lyrics, concluding that "Heaton is no simple lefty ... but his views are brutally uncompromising, and they constitute a very iron fist wrapped in the velvet glove of the Housemartins' blissful guitar pop." In Record Collector, Terry Staunton said that the band "pulled off the admirable trick of shoehorning well-considered social comment into the most radio-friendly of upbeat tunes", and that "the Beautiful South may have showcased a more textured and mature Heaton, but the adolescent rush of these songs still retains many thrills."

== Track listing ==
All songs written by Paul Heaton and Stan Cullimore, except for where noted.

=== Original release (1986) ===
1. "Happy Hour"
2. "Get Up Off Our Knees" (Paul Heaton, Stan Cullimore, Ted Key)
3. "Flag Day" (Paul Heaton, Stan Cullimore, Ted Key)
4. "Anxious"
5. "Reverends Revenge" (instrumental)
6. "Sitting on a Fence"
7. "Sheep"
8. "Over There"
9. "Think for a Minute"
10. "We're Not Deep"
11. "Lean on Me" (Paul Heaton, Pete Wingfield)
12. "Freedom" (Paul Heaton, Stan Cullimore, Ted Key)

CD version adds "I'll Be Your Shelter (Just Like a Shelter)", "People Get Ready", "The Mighty Ship" and "He Ain't Heavy, He's My Brother" to the end of the tracklist.

=== Deluxe Edition Bonus CD (2009) ===
1. "Flag Day" [single version]
2. "Stand at Ease "
3. "You"
4. "Coal Train to Hatfield Main"
5. "I'll Be Your Shelter (Just Like A Shelter)"
6. "People Get Ready" [B-side]
7. "Drop Down Dead"
8. "The Mighty Ship"
9. "He Ain't Heavy He's My Brother"
10. "Think for a Minute" [single version]
11. "Who Needs the Limelight" [B-side]
12. "I Smell Winter"
13. "Joy Joy Joy"
14. "Rap Around the Clock"
15. "Lean on Me" [previously unreleased/outtake rehearsal]
16. "Anxious" [BBC Janice Long session 6/11/85]
17. "We're Not Deep" [BBC Janice Long session 6/11/85]
18. "Freedom" [BBC Janice Long session 6/11/85]
19. "Think for a Minute" [BBC Saturday Live session 4/1/1986]
20. "Drop Down Dead" [BBC Saturday Live session 4/1/1986]
21. "Happy Hour" [BBC John Peel session 6/4/1986]
22. "Get Up Off Our Knees" [BBC John Peel session 6/4/1986]

== Charts ==
Chart (1986)	Peak position
Australian Albums (Kent Music Report)	35
Canada Top Albums/CDs (RPM)	50
UK Albums (OCC)	3

== Personnel ==
=== The Housemartins ===
- Norman Cook – bass, vocals
- Hugh Whitaker – drums, vocals
- P.d. Heaton – lead vocals, guitar, harmonica, melodica
- Stan Cullimore – guitar, vocals

with:

- Pete Wingfield – piano on "Flag Day", "Get Up Off Our Knees", "Anxious" and "Lean on Me"
- Tony Pleeth – cello on "Over There" and "Think for a Minute"
- Jeffrey Wood – piano on "I'll Be Your Shelter"

=== Design ===
- David Storey – album cover design
