= Flag Day (song) =

Single by The Housemartins

from the album London 0 Hull 4
- Released: October 1985
- Recorded: 1985
- Genre: Indie rock
- Length: 3:33
- Label: Go! Discs
- Songwriters: Paul Heaton, Stan Cullimore, Ted Key

The Housemartins singles chronology
"Flag Day" (1985)	"Sheep" (1986)

"Flag Day" is the debut single released by British indie rock band The Housemartins. Released in 1985, it peaked at #124 on the UK Singles Chart, and a re-recorded version of it appeared on the debut album London 0 Hull 4. "Flag Day" also appears on the compilations Now That's What I Call Quite Good, Soup and as a shorter live version on Live at the BBC.

The song was also sampled and used heavily on the dance track "Change the World" by Dino Lenny.

== Track listing ==
- 7"

"Flag Day" / "Stand at Ease"

- 12"

"Flag Day" / "You" / "Stand at Ease" / "Coal Train to Hatfield Main"
