= The People Who Grinned Themselves to Death =

Studio album by The Housemartins
- Released: 21 September 1987
- Studios: Yellow 2, Stockport, Greater Manchester
- Genres: Indie rock; jangle pop
- Length: 38:06
- Labels: Go! Discs (UK); Elektra Entertainment (US)
- Producer: John Williams

The Housemartins chronology
London 0 Hull 4 (1986)	The People Who Grinned Themselves to Death (1987)	Now That's What I Call Quite Good (1988)

The People Who Grinned Themselves to Death is the second and final studio album by The Housemartins. It was released in 1987, and produced three singles - "Five Get Over Excited" (#11 UK), "Me and the Farmer" (#15) and "Build" (#15 UK). The title song is about the British royal family, which found them gaining controversy in the tabloid papers similar to that of other bands such as the Sex Pistols, The Smiths and The Stone Roses.

== Critical reception ==
Professional ratings
Review scores
Source	Rating
AllMusic	4/5 stars
Number One	4/5 stars
Record Mirror	3.5/5 stars
Sounds	4/5 stars
The Village Voice	A−

The People Who Grinned Themselves to Death was ranked number nine among "Albums of the Year" for 1987 in the annual NME critics' poll.

== Track listing ==
All tracks written by Paul Heaton and Stan Cullimore

1. "The People Who Grinned Themselves to Death" – 3:33
2. "I Can't Put My Finger on It" – 2:28
3. "The Light Is Always Green" – 3:59
4. "The World's on Fire" – 3:20
5. "Pirate Aggro" – 1:52
6. "We're Not Going Back" – 2:53
7. "Me and the Farmer" – 2:54
8. "Five Get Over Excited" – 2:44
9. "Johannesburg" – 3:55
10. "Bow Down" – 3:04
11. "You Better Be Doubtful" – 2:32
12. "Build" – 4:45

== Charts ==
Chart (1987)	Peak position
Australia (Kent Music Report)	56
Canada Top Albums/CDs (RPM)	56

== Personnel ==
=== The Housemartins ===
- Norman Cook – bass, vocals
- Dave Hemingway – drums, vocals
- P.d. Heaton – vocals, guitar, trombone, harmonica
- Stan Cullimore – guitar, vocals

=== Additional musicians ===
- Guy Barker – trumpet
- Sandy Blair – tuba
- St. Winifred's School Choir – backing vocals on "Bow Down"
- Pete Wingfield – piano, keyboards

=== Technical personnel ===
- John Williams – producer
- The Housemartins – producer
- Phil Bodger – engineer
- David Storey – sleeve design
- John Sims – sleeve design
- Phil Rainey – front cover photography
- Derek Ridgers – band photography
- John Woods – band photography

== Certifications ==
Certifications for The People Who Grinned Themselves to Death
Region	Certification	Certified units/sales
Spain (Promusicae)	Gold	50,000^{^}
United Kingdom (BPI)	Gold	100,000^{^}
^{^} Shipments figures based on certification alone.
