= Hugh Whitaker =

English musician (born 1961)

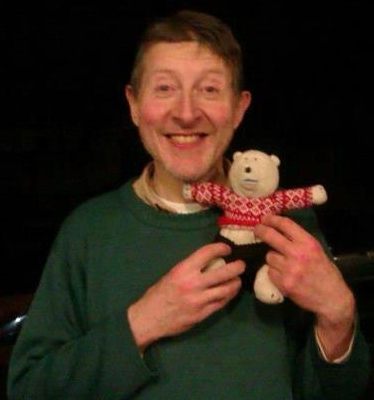
Hugh Whitaker with Ian the Polar Bear (Barnsley, December 2012)

Hugh Whitaker (born 18 May 1961) is an English musician and the former drummer for the British indie rock band The Housemartins. He replaced original drummer Chris Lang and drummed for the band's first album, London 0 Hull 4, and its attendant single releases. He left the band before the recording of their second album, The People Who Grinned Themselves to Death. Whitaker left the band on amicable terms and even participated in the promotional video for the band's first single without him, "Five Get Over Excited".

Whitaker went on to play drums in London-based indie band The Servants, and then in several Hull rock bands, including The Penny Candles, The Juniper Chute, The Fabulous Ducks, and The Gargoyles.

In 1993, Whitaker was sent to prison for six years for assaulting former business associate James Hewitt with an axe and setting fire to his house.

In 1997 Hugh moved to Leeds and then joined a local band, Percy. In 2012, back in Hull, and having played a range of musical styles in many bands, he joined eclectic rock outfit Pocketful O'Nowt. In 2013, he guested on drums on Barnsley comedy band The Bar-Steward Sons of Val Doonican's Tarnlife single, and worked with them again in 2014 on Jump Ararnd and Place of Spades.
