= Happy Hour: The Collection =

Compilation album by The Housemartins
- Released: 25 July 2011
- Genre: Indie rock, jangle pop, alternative rock
- Label: Mercury, Spectrum Audio

The Housemartins chronology
Soup (2007)	Happy Hour: The Collection (2011)

Happy Hour: The Collection was a 2011 compilation album by English indie rock band The Housemartins.

== Track listing ==
The album was released without the permission of Paul Heaton or Norman Cook and was described by Heaton as an absolute sham.

1. Happy Hour
2. Caravan of Love
3. Build
4. Me and the Farmer
5. Think for a Minute
6. Flag Day
7. Bow Down
8. There Is Always Something There to Remind Me
9. We're Not Deep
10. I Can't Put My Finger on It
11. I Smell Winter
12. Johannesburg
13. Get Up Off Our Knees
14. Rap Around the Clock
15. Pirate Aggro
16. He Ain't Heavy, He's My Brother
17. Step Outside
18. You've Got a Friend
19. The People Who Grinned Themselves to Death
20. Lean on Me
