= The Mighty Several =

Studio album by Paul Heaton
- Released: 11 October 2024
- Studios: Blueprint Studios, Salford
- Genres: Pop rock, sophisti-pop
- Length: 44:51
- Label: EMI
- Producer: Ian Broudie

Paul Heaton chronology
| N.K-Pop (2022) | The Mighty Several (2024) | Jenius (2026) |

The Mighty Several is a 2024 album released by Paul Heaton.

The album is Heaton's first without former The Beautiful South bandmate Jacqui Abbott since 2009's Acid Country, after Abbott was unable to commit to the recording due to family reasons. Having decided that he didn't wanted "to just replace her (Abbott)", the album instead features a range of additional musicians (hence its title), such as Scottish singer Rianne Downey, whom Heaton discovered via YouTube, and Danny Muldoon, whom Heaton first encountered when Muldoon was singing in a pub in Manchester.

== Reviews ==
Mojo awarded the album four stars, describing the album as "wry, politically engaged, and worldly-wise".

The i also gave the album four stars, calling it "deliciously addictive... a ham and cheese toastie of an album, where Heaton snuggles into his familiar persona as a sort of jangle-pop Philip Larkin." The newspaper also praised Heaton's "poet's eye for detail", concluding The Mighty Several resembled "a collection of postcards from a world we all recognise but seldom encounter in modern pop."

Record Collector praised the album's dark humour in another four-star review, and praised Ian Broudie's production, "which juxtaposes the jaunty with the jaundiced", while The Guardian's Simon Hattenstone called it "a lovely record", comparing it musically to The Specials, The Pogues and Broudie's band The Lightning Seeds.

== Track listing ==
All tracks are written by Paul Heaton, except where noted.

| No. | Title | Writer(s) | Length |
|---|---|---|---|
| 1. | "National Treasure" | Heaton/Jonny Lexus | 3:18 |
| 2. | "Quicksand" | | 3:01 |
| 3. | "After the Sugar Rush" | | 4:26 |
| 4. | "Fish 'N' Chip Supper" | Heaton/Lexus | 3:51 |
| 5. | "H Into Hurt" | | 2:41 |
| 6. | "Silly Me" | Heaton/Lexus | 4:09 |
| 7. | "Small Boats" | Heaton/Lexus | 3:38 |
| 8. | "Just Another Family" | | 3:01 |
| 9. | "Pull Up A Seat" | | 4:35 |
| 10. | "The Blues Came In" | Heaton/Lexus | 3:29 |
| 11. | "Couldn't Get Dead" | Heaton/Lexus | 3:37 |
| 12. | "Walk On, Slow Down" | Heaton/Lexus | 5:01 |
| Total length: | | | 44:51 |

== Personnel ==
- Paul Heaton – vocals, backing vocals, harmonica
- Pete Marshall – drums, mandolin, violin, backing vocals, string arrangement (1)
- Jonny Lexus – guitar, backing vocals, string arrangement (3)
- Chris Wise – bass, backing vocals
- Stephen Large – keyboards, piano, bass trombone, bass trumpet, accordion, string arrangement (1), brass arrangement (1, 4, 5)

Additional musicians

- Rianne Downey – lead vocals (2, 5, 6, 8, 11), backing vocals (1, 3, 4, 7, 9, 10, 12)
- Danny Muldoon – lead vocals (7, 9)
- Yvonne Shelton – lead vocals (6), backing vocals (9)
- Ian Broudie – acoustic guitar (1), backing vocals (7)
- Natalie Purton – violin (1, 3)
- Sarah Brandwood-Spencer – violin (1, 3)
- Paula Smart – violin (1, 3)
- Josephine Wells – viola (1, 3)
- Liz Hanks – cello (1, 3)
- Josh Poole – saxophone (1, 4, 5)
- Roland Parsons – trumpet (1, 4, 5)
- Tom Berry – trombone (1, 4, 5)

Technical

- Ian Broudie – production, mixing
- Stephen Harris – engineering, mixing
- Tony Cousins – mastering
- John Williams – musical consultancy
- Paul Husband – photography
- Dominic Foster – album design

== Charts ==
Chart performance for The Mighty Several
| Chart (2024) | Peak position |
|---|---|
| UK Albums (Official Charts) | 2 |
