= Jenius (album) =

2026 album by Paul Heaton

Studio album by Paul Heaton
- Released: 21 August 2026
- Length: 55:57
- Label: EMI
- Producer: Ian Broudie

Paul Heaton chronology
The Mighty Several (2024)	Jenius (2026)

Jenius is a 2026 album by Paul Heaton. It was Heaton's first solo album to reach #1 in the UK album chart although Heaton has achieved several #1 albums with former Beautiful South collaborator Jacqui Abbott.

The album received generally positive reviews from critics: Jamie Atkins of Record Collector awarded the album four stars, writing that musically, "all bets are off... But Heaton's lyrics are as consistent as ever," adding that "vocally too, his power is undiminished." Fiona Shepherd of The Scotsman also gave the album four stars, and praised Heaton as "the guy propping up the bar that you actually do want to listen to." Victoria Segal of The Times gave Jenius four stars as well, describing it as "casually funny" and "deceptively piercing".

== Track list ==
Jenius track listing
No.	Title	Length
1.	"Can't Get Next to You"	3:07
2.	"Favourite Kind of Idiot"	2:52
3.	"I Want the Job"	4:04
4.	"Sad Songs and Lawsuits"	3:21
5.	"She Ain't Pretty"	3:25
6.	"One Eye Open"	3:32
7.	"Send in the Clowns"	4:08
8.	"Do Not Ask Me"	3:43
9.	"Don't Lean on Me"	3:36
10.	"Jet Black Sky"	5:01
11.	"The Whisky Did"	3:34
12.	"Before Before"	3:06
13.	"Good for the Bees"	5:31
14.	"Go Upstream"	3:16
15.	"A Son a Father"	3:35
Total length:		55:57

== Charts ==
Chart performance for Jenius
Chart (2026)	Peak position
UK Albums (Official Charts)	1
