= Different Drummer (album) =

Studio album by Isley Jasper Isley
- Released: 1987
- Genre: Funk
- Length: 44:35
- Label: CBS / Epic

Isley Jasper Isley chronology
Caravan of Love (1985)	Different Drummer (1987)

Professional ratings
Review scores
Source	Rating
AllMusic	3/5 stars
The Encyclopedia of Popular Music	3/5 stars
The Rolling Stone Album Guide	3.5/5 stars

Different Drummer is the third and final album by Isley-Jasper-Isley, released in 1987. Following its release, the Isleys would reunite with The Isley Brothers, while Jasper would go solo. "8th Wonder of the World" and "Givin' You Back the Love" entered the R&B Top 20.

== Critical reception ==
AllMusic wrote that "the singing was perfunctory, the production and arrangements routine, and [the band] got little mileage from any of the material."

== Track listing ==
- All tracks produced, arranged and written by Isley-Jasper-Isley (track 8 written with Deborah McDuffie)

Information is based on liner notes

1. Different Drummer (5:46)
  Lead vocals: Ernie Isley
2. 8th Wonder of the World (5:30)
  Lead vocals: Ernie Isley
  Congas: Kevin Jones
3. Blue Rose (5:54)
  Lead vocals: Ernie Isley
4. Do It Right (4:05)
  Lead vocals: Chris Jasper
  Congas: Kevin Jones
5. Givin' You Back the Love (5:24)
  Lead vocals: Chris Jasper
  Congas: Kevin Jones
6. A Once in a Lifetime Lady (4:22)
  Lead vocals: Chris Jasper
7. For the Sake of Love (5:15)
  Lead vocals: Ernie Isley
8. Brother to Brother (3:49)
  Lead vocals: Chris Jasper
9. I Wanna Be Yours (4:30)
  Lead vocals: Chris Jasper

== Personnel ==
- Ernie Isley – lead guitar, drums, additional percussion
- Chris Jasper – grand piano, electric piano, additional synthesizers, additional percussion
- Marvin Isley – Fender bass, electric bass, Roland synthesizer, additional synthesizers, additional percussion, background vocals
- Carol Cafiero – assistant engineer
- David Dachinger – recording engineer, audio mixing
- Lance McVicar – assistant engineer
- Billy Messinetti – additional music programming, Simmons SD VII
- Rich Novak – assistant engineer
- Tim Reppert – assistant engineer
- Ed Tuton – additional music programming, DX7, Linn 9000
- Tom Vercillo – assistant engineer
