= Happy Hour (disambiguation) =

Happy hour is the practice of offering reduced prices (usually alcoholic beverages) for a specified period of time.

Happy Hour may also refer to:

== Music ==
=== Albums ===
- Happy Hour, a 1974 album by Tony Booth
- Happy Hour (Humans album), 1981
- Happy Hour, a 1981 album by Eumir Deodato
- Happy Hour (Ted Hawkins album), 1985
- Happy Hour (King Missile album), 1992
- Happy Hour (Youth Brigade album), 1994
- Happy Hour (N-Trance album), 1998
- Happy Hour (Shonen Knife album), 1998
- Happy Hour (Bob & Tom album), 2005
- Happy Hour (Tommy Emmanuel album), 2006
- Happy Hour (Uncle Kracker album), 2009
  - Happy Hour: The South River Road Sessions, the EP version
- Happy Hour!, a 2010 Japan-only compilation album by The Offspring
- Happy Hour: The Collection, 2011 compilation album by the Housemartins

=== Songs ===
- "Happy Hour" (The Housemartins song), 1986
- "Happy Hour", a 2009 song by Cheryl Cole from 3 Words
- "Happy Hour" (Weezer song), 2017
- "Happy Hour", a song by Kara from Move Again

== Films ==
- Happy Hour (1986 film), a film co-written by Costa Dillon
- Happy Hour (1995 film), a movie starring Jordan Chan
- Happy Hour (2003 film), a film directed and co-written by Mike Bencivenga
- Happy Hour (2015 German film), a comedy film directed by Franz Müller
- Happy Hour (2015 Japanese film), a drama film directed by Ryusuke Hamaguchi

== Television ==
- "Happy Hour" (The Office), an episode of the American comedy series The Office
- Happy Hour (TV series), a sitcom on American TV
- Al Murray's Happy Hour, a chat show on British TV
- Happy Hour (1999 TV series), show hosted by Ahmet and Dweezil Zappa

== Other ==
- Happy Hour (comic strip), a comic created in 2004 by Jim Kohl

== See also ==
- Happy Hours (disambiguation)
