= Me and the Farmer =

Single by The Housemartins

from the album The People Who Grinned Themselves to Death
- Released: 24 August 1987
- Recorded: 1987
- Genre: Rock
- Label: Go! Discs
- Songwriters: Paul Heaton, Stan Cullimore.

The Housemartins singles chronology
"Five Get Over Excited" (1987)	"Me and the Farmer" (1987)	"Build" (1987)

"Me and the Farmer" is a single by British Indie rock band The Housemartins from the album The People Who Grinned Themselves to Death. It reached #15 in the UK singles chart the week of 12 September 1987. The song had been written some 18 months previously, on 22 January 1986 (the same day as Happy Hour).

The B-Side "Step Outside" later appeared on the 1988 compilation LP Now That's What I Call Quite Good.

The song is about how gentleman farmers treat their workers badly.

== 7 inch single track listing ==
- "Me and the Farmer"
- "I Bit My Lip"

== 12 inch/cassette single track listing ==
- "Me and the Farmer"
- "He Will Find You Out"
- "Step Outside"
- "I Bit My Lip"

== Charts ==
=== Weekly charts ===
Chart (1987)	Peak position
Irish Singles Chart	4
Italy Airplay (Music & Media)	20
UK Singles Chart	15
