= Manchester (song) =

Single by The Beautiful South

from the album Superbi
- Released: 2006
- Genre: Pop rock
- Label: Sony BMG
- Composer: David Rotheray
- Lyricist: Paul Heaton
- Producer: Ian Stanley

The Beautiful South singles chronology
"This Will Be Our Year" (2005)	"Manchester" (2006)	"The Rose of My Cologne" (2006)

"Manchester" is a single by the British band The Beautiful South. It reached #41 on the UK charts. The song also appeared on their album Superbi.

"Manchester" is a song about the city of Manchester in North West England, known for its apparent notoriety for a rainy climate.

"Manchester" immortalised many towns and settlements in its lyrics:

"From Northenden to Partington it's rain
From Altrincham to Chadderton it's rain
From Moss Side to Swinton hardly Spain
It's a picture postcard of 'wish they never came"

The video for this song was filmed in Collyhurst and features maisonettes that are no longer there and the famous Billy Green pub which closed in 2011 and was demolished a few years later. A number of the extras in the video were people who lived in the area.
