= Perfect 10 (song) =

1998 single by the Beautiful South

Single by the Beautiful South

from the album Quench
- B-side: "If"
- Released: 21 September 1998
- Length: 3:37
- Label: Mercury; Go! Discs
- Songwriters: Paul Heaton; Dave Rotheray
- Producers: Jon Kelly; Paul Heaton

The Beautiful South singles chronology
"Liars' Bar" (1997)	"Perfect 10" (1998)	"Dumb" (1998)

Music video
- "Perfect 10" on YouTube

"Perfect 10" is a song by English pop rock band the Beautiful South, released on 21 September 1998 as the first single from their sixth studio album, Quench (1998). It debuted at number two on the UK Singles Chart, selling 89,000 copies during its first week of release, and is the band's last UK top-10 single as of 2026. It received a platinum certification from the British Phonographic Industry (BPI) for sales and streaming figures exceeding 600,000 units.

== Recording contributions ==
As well as the contributions from band members, in the documentary Paul Heaton: From Hull to Heatongrad, songwriter Paul Heaton refers to contributions to the recording from Norman Cook and Paul Weller, who offered production assistance and rhythm guitar, respectively. Their contributions are also mentioned on the liner notes for Quench.

== Analysis ==
The verses of the song—sung alternately by Paul Heaton and Jacqui Abbott—are made up of a series of innuendos using clothing sizes and penis length to illustrate a loving relationship between two people who don't conform to modern stereotypes of physical perfection. The male vocal shows that although his partner is a little on the large side ("but she wears a 12"), she is a 'perfect 10' in his eyes. He also states, "the anorexic chicks, the model 6, they don't hold no weight with me," preferring instead to, "hold something I can see."

Likewise, the female vocal references penis size in several places, suggesting that "XXL" is unnecessary ("Every penny don't fit the slot") and that even when all her partner has to offer is "a poor poor 4, there ain't no man can replace."

The chorus to the song is sung by both male and female vocals, and confirms the theme of a happy and accepting relationship beyond ideas of conventional beauty, with Heaton and Abbott stating:

"We love our love, in different sizes
I love her body, especially the lines
Time takes its toll, but not on the eyes
Promise me this, take me tonight."

== Critical reception ==
Scottish newspaper Daily Record described the song as "great" and "bitter-sweet". Caroline Sullivan from The Guardian called it "jazzy", noting that "Heaton's sweet-voiced 'I love her body, 'specially the lines', has one of the tenderest lines on an album full of memorable bons mots." Adrian Thrills from Daily Mail declared it as "a rasping musical debate about sexual politics, neatly driven along by funky piano and honking sax". Ian Hyland from Sunday Mirror rated the song nine out of ten, adding, "The funkier sound is new but their observations on the important things in life are sharp as ever. Almost perfect." Johnny Dee from The Times remarked that it "manages to be both funny and touching at the same time."

== Track listings ==
- UK CD1 and Australian CD single
1. "Perfect 10"
2. "If"
3. "I'll Sail This Ship Alone"
- UK CD2
1. "Perfect 10"
2. "Loving Arms"
3. "One Last Love Song"
- UK cassette single
1. "Perfect 10"
2. "If"

== Personnel ==
Personnel are adapted from the Quench liner notes.

- Paul Heaton – writing, vocals, production
- Dave Rotheray – writing, guitar
- Jacqueline Abbott – vocals
- Dave Hemingway – vocals
- Sean Welch – bass
- David Stead – drums
- Paul Weller – additional guitar
- Damon Butcher – keyboards
- Gary Hammond – percussion
- Kick Horns – brass
- Norman Cook – rhythm consultant
- Jon Kelly – production
- John Brough – engineering, mixing

== Charts ==
=== Weekly charts ===
Chart (1998–1999)	Peak position
Europe (Eurochart Hot 100)	15
Germany (GfK)	64
Iceland (Íslenski Listinn Topp 40)	17
Ireland (IRMA)	6
Scotland Singles (OCC)	2
Sweden (Sverigetopplistan)	23
Switzerland (Schweizer Hitparade)	47
UK Singles (OCC)	2

=== Year-end charts ===
Chart (1998)	Position
UK Singles (OCC)	37

== Certifications ==
Region	Certification	Certified units/sales
United Kingdom (BPI)	Platinum	600,000^{‡}
^{‡} Sales+streaming figures based on certification alone.

== In popular culture ==
"Perfect 10" was seen as a 'tour classic' by the Beautiful South and it has been stated by Dave Stead that, "There are certain songs you just can't leave out...I think we would be lynched if we didn't play "You Keep It All In", "Don't Marry Her" and "Perfect 10"."
