= Caravan of Love (album) =

Studio album by Isley Jasper Isley
- Released: Oct. 1985
- Genre: Funk
- Length: 35:43
- Label: CBS

Isley Jasper Isley chronology
Broadway's Closer to Sunset Blvd (1984)	Caravan of Love (1985)	Different Drummer (1987)

Professional ratings
Review scores
Source	Rating
AllMusic	4.5 stars
The Encyclopedia of Popular Music	3/5 stars
MusicHound Rock: The Essential Album Guide	3/5 stars
The Rolling Stone Album Guide	3.5/5 stars

Caravan of Love is the second album by Isley-Jasper-Isley, released in 1985. According to Marc Taylor, "the trio made a conscious effort to add more of a soulful flavor to their 1985 follow-up album." Taylor called the title track "a beautiful, melodic, and lyrically powerful gem." The song topped the US R&B chart for three weeks. The second single, "Insatiable Woman", is a "sweet, mid-tempo love song" that was dedicated to Jasper's wife. It peaked at number 13 on the R&B chart in early 1986. The album itself reached number three on the R&B albums chart.

== Track listing ==
- All tracks written and arranged by Isley Jasper Isley

Information is based on liner notes.

1. Dancin' Around the World (6:04)
  Lead vocals: Ernie Isley
2. Insatiable Woman (5:12)
  Lead vocals: Chris Jasper
3. I Can Hardly Wait (4:12)
  Lead vocals: Chris Jasper
4. Liberation (5:26)
  Lead vocals: Ernie Isley
5. Caravan of Love (5:41)
  Lead vocals: Chris Jasper
6. If You Believe in Love (4:00)
  Lead vocals: Ernie Isley
7. High Heel Syndrome (5:08)
  Lead vocals: Ernie Isley & Chris Jasper
  - All backing vocals by Isley Jasper Isley.

== Personnel ==
- Marvin Isley - Fender bass, bass synthesizer, Roland synthesizer, percussion
- Chris Jasper - Grand piano, electric piano, additional synthesizers, percussion
- Ernie Isley - Lead Guitar, Rhythm Guitar, drums, percussion
- David Dachinger - Recording engineer, audio mixing
- Tom Vercillo - Assistant engineer

== Month of Release ==
Entered the Billboard 200 on 27th Oct. 1985 at #167.
