= N.K-Pop =

Studio album by Paul Heaton and Jacqui Abbott
- Released: 7 October 2022
- Genre: Pub rock
- Length: 43:34
- Label: EMI
- Producer: John Owen Williams

Paul Heaton chronology
Manchester Calling (2020)	N.K-Pop (2022)	The Mighty Several (2024)

Jacqui Abbott chronology
Manchester Calling (2020)	N.K-Pop (2022)

Singles from N.K-Pop
- 1. "Still" Released: 22 July 2022; 2. "Too Much for One (Not Enough for Two)" Released: 18 August 2022

N.K-Pop (also written N.K. Pop) is the fifth studio album by Paul Heaton and Jacqui Abbott, both formerly members of the Beautiful South. The album was released on 7 October 2022 by EMI Records, and preceded by the release of the lead single "Still". The album debuted atop the UK Albums Chart.

== Background ==
The songs were all written in various pubs and "drinking hostelries". The album's title is "a typical Heaton joke, a sly crack at the overproduced super-slick youth-centric flashiness of fashionable K-pop", with Heaton's "humorously grouchy conceit" being "to ally himself with its exact opposite". Heaton has said, "We're K-pop if you're on the wrong side of the border."

== Critical reception ==
Professional ratings
Aggregate scores
Source	Rating
Metacritic	81/100
Review scores
Source	Rating
Daily Express	8/10
Financial Times	3/5 stars
musicOMH	4/5 stars
Record Collector	4/5 stars
The Scotsman	3/5 stars
The Telegraph	3/5 stars

On review aggregator Metacritic, the album received a score of 81 out of 100 based on five critics' reviews, indicating "universal acclaim".

John Murphy of musicOMH found that "While much of N.K. Pop is firmly in the tradition of radio-friendly pop, it's the lyrics that give these songs their extra dimension", concluding that "There are songs on N.K. Pop that stand squarely alongside some of Heaton's best" and that the "famous fire of his shows no sign of being extinguished". Reviewing the album for Record Collector, Terry Staunton opined that there is "wry humour throughout" the album and that "Heaton remains the go-to chronicler of the Everyman condition" with Abbott providing "a vital contribution as both equal-billing foil and relatable conduit of female perspectives in these songs".

Neil McCormick of The Telegraph wrote that Heaton is "back [...] threading barbed wired lyrics through rose garden melodies to catch listeners unaware". McCormick felt that while Heaton and "Abbott "harmonise delightfully" on the album, with Abbott "effectively sound[ing] like a female version of the frontman", he "wish[ed Heaton] would push himself a little harder" as "there are a few too many songs on N.K-Pop that are just witticisms, wordplay and easy on the ear melodies, bashed down in the studio with a certain vigour but no real imagination."

== Commercial performance ==
The album debuted at number one on the UK Albums Chart on 14 October 2022, becoming Heaton and Abbott's second number-one album after their previous record together, Manchester Calling (2020). It is the fifth UK number-one album for both overall, including their three number-one albums as part of the Beautiful South.

== Track listing ==
Songs written by Paul Heaton and Jonny Lexus, except tracks 3, 4, 8 and 12 by Paul Heaton

N.K-Pop track listing
No.	Title	Length
1.	"The Good Times"	4:39
2.	"Too Much for One (Not Enough for Two)"	2:44
3.	"Who Built the Pyramids?"	4:26
4.	"I Drove Her Away with My Tears"	2:50
5.	"When the World Would Actually Listen"	2:49
6.	"Still"	4:35
7.	"I Ain't Going Nowhere This Year"	3:55
8.	"Sunny Side Up"	2:53
9.	"Baby It's Cold Inside"	3:41
10.	"New Fella"	2:59
11.	"My Mother's Womb"	3:48
12.	"His Master's Game"	4:15
Total length:		43:34

== Charts ==
Chart performance for N.K-Pop
Chart (2022)	Peak position
Irish Albums (Official Charts)	4
Scottish Albums (Official Charts)	1
UK Albums (Official Charts)	1
