= Superbi =

Studio album by the Beautiful South
- Released: 15 May 2006
- Recorded: 2005
- Genre: Alternative rock
- Length: 47:26
- Label: Sony BMG
- Producer: Ian Stanley

The Beautiful South chronology
| Gold (2006) | Superbi (2006) | Soup (2007) |

Singles from Superbi
- 1. "Manchester" Released: 8 May 2006; 2. "The Rose of My Cologne" Released: 10 July 2006

Professional ratings
Review scores
| Source | Rating |
|---|---|
| AllMusic | link |
| The Guardian | link |
| Manchester Evening News | (favorable) link |
| MusicOMH | link |
| Robert Christgau | A− link |

Superbi is the tenth and final studio album by the English group the Beautiful South, released on 15 May 2006 by Sony BMG. The album entered the British chart at No. 6 before dropping to No. 20 and No. 37 in its second and third weeks, respectively. It was released before their split on 30 January 2007. The album was produced by the former Tears for Fears keyboard player Ian Stanley.

== Recording ==
The album was recorded at Real World Studios in Wiltshire, a farm in Bakewell, Derbyshire, and producer Ian Stanley's studio in Enniskerry, Ireland. It was mixed by Bill Price (Sex Pistols, the Clash, Guns N' Roses).

== Track listing ==
All tracks composed by Paul Heaton and Dave Rotheray

1. "The Rose of My Cologne" – 3:47
2. "Manchester" – 3:54
3. "There Is Song" – 4:08
4. "The Cat Loves the Mouse" – 3:36
5. "The Next Verse" – 4:53
6. "When Romance Is Dead" – 3:01
7. "Meanwhile" – 3:18
8. "Space" – 3:37
9. "Bed of Nails" – 4:10
10. "Never Lost a Chicken to a Fox" – 4:14
11. "From Now On" – 4:43
12. "Tears" – 4:05

== Singles ==
"Manchester" was released on 8 May 2006 in the UK. It reached 41 in the singles chart, a very disappointing position compared to other first singles. This is thought to be due to the decline of CD singles which, by 2006, were increasingly the preserve of an older audience.

"The Rose of My Cologne" was released on 10 July 2006 in the UK. It reached 99 in the singles chart for the first week. This made this single the worst performing out of all of those released by the band.

As was their usual modus operandi, The Beautiful South included unreleased material on the B-sides of the singles taken from their albums.

from the "Manchester" CD single

- "Manchester"
- "If Teardrops Were Silver"

from "The Rose of My Cologne" CD single

- "The Rose of My Cologne"
- "Farewell" (although its title is a coincidence, this turned out to be the last new track released by the band)

== Personnel ==
The Beautiful South

- Paul Heaton – vocals
- Dave Hemingway – vocals
- Alison Wheeler – vocals
- Dave Rotheray – guitar
- Sean Welch – bass
- Dave Stead – drums

with:

- Damon Butcher – keyboards
- Gary Hammond – percussion
- Johnny Scott – banjo, dobro, mandolin
- The London Session Orchestra – strings; arranged by Simon Hale

Technical

- Bruno Ellington, Kieran Lynch – engineer
- Bill Price, Richard Rainey – mixing
- Martin Parr – cover photography
