= Broadway's Closer to Sunset Blvd =

Studio album by Isley-Jasper-Isley
- Released: November 8, 1984
- Studio: Bearsville Studios
- Genre: Funk
- Length: 37:45
- Label: CBS / Epic
- Producer: Isley-Jasper-Isley

Isley-Jasper-Isley chronology
Broadway's Closer to Sunset Blvd (1984)	Caravan of Love (1985)

Broadway's Closer to Sunset Blvd is the 1984 debut album of Isley-Jasper-Isley on CBS/Magic Sound Records. Marvin Isley announced the record as a separate project from The Isley Brothers rather than a permanent break up. "Look the Other Way" reached number 14 on the R&B chart, "Kiss and Tell," went to number 52.

== Track listing ==
Information is based on the album's liner notes

1. Sex Drive (5:28)
  Background Vocals: Audrey Wheeler & Sandy Barber
2. Serve You Right (5:07)
3. I Can't Get Over Losin' You (4:05)
  Background Vocals: Audrey Wheeler & Sandy Barber
  Congas: Mr. Kevin Jones
4. Kiss and Tell (5:28)
5. Love Is Gonna Last Forever (4:28)
6. Broadway Closer to Sunset Blvd. (3:33)
7. Look the Other Way (5:06)
8. Break This Chain (4:30)
  Congas: Mr. Kevin Jones

Notes

- All Tracks written, produced & arranged by Isley-Jasper-Isley
- Additional Background Vocals performed by Isley-Jasper-Isley

== Personnel ==
- Marvin Isley - Lead vocals, electric bass, bass synth, other percussion
- Chris Jasper - Lead vocals, rap vocals, electric Grand piano, keyboards, additional synthesizers, other percussion
- Ernie Isley - Lead vocals, 12-string acoustic guitar, 12-string electric guitar, drums, timbales, other percussion
- Kenneth Lonas - Assistant engineer
- Mark McKenna - Recording engineer, remixing
