= Sheep (The Housemartins song) =

Single by the Housemartins

from the album London 0 Hull 4
- Released: 1986
- Label: Go! Discs
- Songwriters: Paul Heaton and Stan Cullimore

The Housemartins singles chronology
"Flag Day" (1985)	"Sheep" (1986)	"Happy Hour" (1986)

"Sheep" is the second single released by British indie rock band the Housemartins. It was the first chart single by the band; it later appeared on the album London 0 Hull 4.

== Single details ==
- 7-inch - Sheep b/w Drop Down Dead (GOD 9)
- Special edition 3-track 7-inch: Sheep b/w I'll Be Your Shelter, Drop Down Dead (GODD 9)
- 12-inch - Sheep, I'll Be Your Shelter, Anxious, Drop Down Dead, People Get Ready (GODX 9)

== Charts ==
Chart (1986)	Peak position
Australian (Kent Music Report)	97
UK Singles Chart	56
