= Paul Heaton Presents the 8th =

Studio album by Paul Heaton
- Released: 2012

Paul Heaton Presents the 8th is a 2012 album by Paul Heaton. The album is a concept album themed loosely around the Seven deadly sins. The album was commissioned by Manchester International Festival and co-written with theatre director Che Walker. The album contains narration by the American actor Reg Cathey.

== Reviews ==
A critical review of the album in Uncut stated that "The story is terminally confused, the soggy soul texture dated".

== Live performances ==
Ben Walsh writing for The Independent described a live performance of the album as "a hectoring, jarring, humourless experience" although individual vocal performances were praised including Beautiful South’s Jacqui Abbot on 'Envy'.

== Track listing ==
1. The Southside
2. Panther
3. Sermon of a Little Faith
4. Pharoah's Boot
5. Lust
6. Strawberry-Type Birthmark
7. Gluttony
8. Uncle Luther, Officer Pork-Pork and Fat Alice
9. Greed
10. Newfounded Uprising Collective
11. Wrath
12. Ain't Done Payin' Yet
13. Envy
14. Pharaoh's Lair
15. Sloth
16. The Street Been Put to Sleep
17. Pride
18. The People Who Own the Night
19. Gossip
20. Coda
21. Walk Into the Light
