= Crooked Calypso =

Studio album by Paul Heaton and Jacqui Abbott
- Released: 21 July 2017
- Studio: The Chairworks, Castleford
- Genre: Alternative; indie rock
- Length: 46:30 (standard edition); 71:52 (deluxe edition)
- Label: Virgin EMI
- Producer: John Owen Williams

Paul Heaton chronology
Wisdom, Laughter and Lines (2015)	Crooked Calypso (2017)	The Last King of Pop (2018)

Jacqui Abbott chronology
Wisdom, Laughter and Lines (2015)	Crooked Calypso (2017)	Manchester Calling (2020)

Singles from Crooked Calypso
- 1. "I Gotta Praise" Released: 16 June 2017; 2. "She Got the Garden" Released: 25 August 2017

Crooked Calypso is the third studio album by Paul Heaton and Jacqui Abbott, both formerly members of the Beautiful South. The album was released in the UK on 21 July 2017 by Virgin EMI.

When writing the lyrics for the album, Heaton again retreated to the Netherlands, while the music was written in Gran Canaria together with guitarist Jonny Lexus. The photography for the album was by Sean Welch, the bassist for The Beautiful South.

A deluxe edition was also available upon the album's release, which included a DVD of a live performance recorded at Scarborough Open Air Theatre on 5 August 2016.

== Reception ==
Professional ratings
Review scores
Source	Rating
AllMusic	4/5 stars
The Guardian	4/5 stars

Crooked Calypso attracted mainly positive reviews upon release. Writing for The Guardian, Rachel Aroesti comments how Heaton delivers "observations about British society's ironies and inequalities" with "gusto, his droll lyricism drilling into subject matter from obesity... and the cavernous divide between rich and poor... over a backing of the kind of jaunty pop that can take in folk, disco and blues without ever breaking its buoyant stride."

In a review for AllMusic, Timothy Monger wrote, "There's something refreshingly organic about their big productions, which layer strings and horns over a whip-tight rock combo that sways nimbly between Motown, R&B, and old-fashioned rock & roll within the breadth of just a few notes."

== Track listing ==
Crooked Calypso track listing
No.	Title	Length
1.	"I Gotta Praise"	2:37
2.	"He Wants To"	3:48
3.	"If I May"	4:03
4.	"She Got the Garden"	3:20
5.	"People Like Us"	4:43
6.	"Blackwater Banks"	3:53
7.	"The Lord Is a White Con"	4:20
8.	"Silence Is"	4:00
9.	"Love Makes You Happy"	4:22
10.	"The Fat Man"	3:46
11.	"Your Bit of Stuff"	2:46
12.	"He Can't Marry Her"	4:52

Crooked Calypso – Deluxe edition (bonus tracks)
No.	Title	Length
13.	"Market Street"	9:09
14.	"Since My Dearest Husband"	4:25
15.	"The Future Mrs Heaton"	6:37
16.	"The Dice"	5:16

== Charts ==
Chart performance for Crooked Calypso
Chart (2017)	Peak position
Irish Albums (IRMA)	10
Scottish Albums (OCC)	1
UK Albums (OCC)	2

== Certifications ==
Certification for Crooked Calypso
Region	Certification	Certified units/sales
United Kingdom (BPI)	Silver	60,000^{‡}
^{‡} Sales+streaming figures based on certification alone.
