= What Have We Become? (album) =

Studio album by Paul Heaton and Jacqui Abbott
- Released: 19 May 2014
- Recorded: 2013
- Studios: The Chairworks, Castleford, West Yorkshire
- Genres: Alternative, indie rock
- Length: 45:28
- Label: Virgin EMI
- Producer: John Owen Williams

Paul Heaton chronology
Paul Heaton Presents the 8th (2012)	What Have We Become? (2014)	Wisdom, Laughter and Lines (2015)

Jacqui Abbott chronology
What Have We Become? (2014)	Wisdom, Laughter and Lines (2015)

Singles from What Have We Become
- 1. "D.I.Y." Released: 5 May 2014; 2. "Moulding of a Fool" Released: 21 July 2014; 3. "When It Was Ours" Released: 29 September 2014; 4. "Real Hope" Released: 24 November 2014

What Have We Become? is a studio album by the former The Beautiful South collaborators Paul Heaton and Jacqui Abbott, released on 19 May 2014 through Virgin EMI Records.

It charted at number three in the UK Albums Chart. The album was certified gold by the British Phonographic Industry on 30 October 2015 for sales over 100,000 copies.

The album's first single, "D.I.Y", reached number 75 on the UK singles chart, and was added to BBC Radio 2's playlist in April 2014. The video for the single was directed by Johnny Vegas and features Heaton spray-painted silver as a living statue.

The album's cover painting is by David Storey.

== Reception ==
Professional ratings
Aggregate scores
Source	Rating
Metacritic	76/100
Review scores
Source	Rating
AllMusic	4/5 stars

What Have We Become? received generally positive reviews from music critics. The album received an average score of 76/100 from 14 reviews on Metacritic, indicating "generally favorable reviews".

In his review for AllMusic, David Jeffries wrote that, "Anyone who enjoys their pop with extra wry and some sobering awareness should love What Have We Become?, but it's the Beautiful South faithful who will rightfully gush over the release, as these antiheroes have lost none of their touch or fatalistic flair."

== Track listing ==
All tracks are written by Paul Heaton, except where noted

What Have We Become? track listing
No.	Title	Writer(s)	Length
1.	"Moulding of a Fool"	Paul Heaton, Jonny Lexus	3:39
2.	"D.I.Y."		2:21
3.	"Some Dancing to Do"	Heaton, Lexus	4:13
4.	"One Man's England"	Heaton, Lexus	4:12
5.	"What Have We Become"		4:31
6.	"The Snowman"	Heaton, Lexus	3:50
7.	"Costa del Sombre"		3:15
8.	"The Right in Me"	Heaton, Lexus	3:18
9.	"When It Was Ours"		4:12
10.	"I Am Not a Muse"	Heaton, Lexus	4:48
11.	"Stupid Tears"	Heaton, Lexus	2:17
12.	"When I Get Back to Blighty"	Heaton, Lexus	4:52

What Have We Become – Deluxe edition (bonus tracks)
No.	Title	Writer(s)	Length
13.	"If He Don't"	Heaton, Lexus	3:47
14.	"My Own Mother's Son"	Heaton, Lexus	3:19
15.	"Advice To Daughters"	Heaton, Lexus	6:37
16.	"You're Gonna Miss Me"		3:49
17.	"Loving Arms"	Heaton, Tom Jans	3:40
18.	"Real Hope"		3:05
19.	"The Snowman" (Brass Version)	Heaton, Lexus	3:49

== Charts ==
=== Weekly charts ===
Weekly chart performance for What Have We Become?
Chart (2014)	Peak position
Irish Albums (IRMA)	26
Scottish Albums (Official Charts)	4
UK Albums (Official Charts)	3

=== Year-end charts ===
Year-end chart performance for What Have We Become?
Chart (2014)	Position
UK Albums (OCC)	81
