= Manchester Calling =

Studio album by Paul Heaton and Jacqui Abbott
- Released: 6 March 2020
- Studio: Blueprint Studios (Salford, Manchester)
- Genre: Pop; folk; ska; soul
- Length: 64:54
- Label: Virgin EMI
- Producer: John Owen Williams

Paul Heaton chronology
The Last King of Pop (2018)	Manchester Calling (2020)	N.K-Pop (2022)

Jacqui Abbott chronology
Crooked Calypso (2017)	Manchester Calling (2020)	N.K-Pop (2022)

Singles from Manchester Calling
- 1. "You and Me (Were Meant to Be Together)" Released: 14 February 2020

Manchester Calling is the fourth studio album by Paul Heaton and Jacqui Abbott, both formerly members of the Beautiful South. The album was released on 6 March 2020 by Virgin EMI.

Heaton wrote the songs in various locations in North Holland and Belgium, and composed the music between a hotel in Puerto Rico, Gran Canaria in the Canary Islands, and in Limburg an der Lahn, Germany.

Heaton and Abbott were set to tour the UK in support of the album across April and May 2020, but this was postponed until later in the year due to the COVID-19 pandemic. They also performed several songs on The Late Late Show on 6 March.

== Background ==
Heaton called the theme of the album "anti growth, anti greed, [and] against the continuous tearing down of old buildings and sticking up soulless offices, and the disappearance of local accents on TV, along with the creeping spread of Americanese" in the United Kingdom, and more specifically Manchester. The cover of the album is a composite picture of two skyscrapers, one of which is the Beetham Tower, the location of the Hilton Manchester Deansgate.

== Critical reception ==
Professional ratings
Aggregate scores
Source	Rating
Metacritic	79/100
Review scores
Source	Rating
The Guardian	3/5 stars
The Scotsman	3/5 stars

Writing for The Guardian, Dave Simpson called the songs "richly observed, gently acerbic vignettes about the vagaries of British life, delivered over a mix of steadily uptempo pop, folk, ska and soul".

In a review for The Scotsman, Fiona Shepherd felt that Manchester Calling is about Heaton disliking "what he sees in Brexit Britain" as well as his "tribute to The Clash's London Calling, broadly inspired by commercial expansion in the city he calls home", although Heaton also still writes about "the man on the street or in his home" with "wry lyrics in diverse, celebratory sonic settings".

== Track listing ==
Manchester Calling track listing
No.	Title	Length
1.	"The Only Exercise I Get Is You"	3:20
2.	"If You Could See Your Faults"	3:51
3.	"Somebody's Superhero"	3:57
4.	"Big News in a Little World"	4:01
5.	"You and Me (Were Meant to Be Together)"	3:35
6.	"The Outskirts of the Dancefloor"	4:38
7.	"So Happy"	3:17
8.	"A Good Day Is Hard to Find"	4:12
9.	"Fat of the Land"	3:59
10.	"All of My Friends"	3:37
11.	"The Prison"	3:56
12.	"House Party 2"	4:45
13.	"He's Got What I Had"	3:35
14.	"New York Ivy"	5:24
15.	"MCR Calling"	4:52
16.	"My Legal High"	3:48
Total length:		64:54

== Charts ==
Chart performance for Manchester Calling
Chart (2020)	Peak position
Irish Albums (OCC)	3
Scottish Albums (OCC)	2
UK Albums (OCC)	1
