= Isley-Jasper-Isley =

1984–1987 American musical trio

- Origin: Cincinnati, Ohio, U.S. Teaneck, New Jersey, U.S.
- Genres: R&B, soul, rock, funk
- Years active: 1984–1987
- Label: CBS Associated
- Spinoff of: The Isley Brothers
- Past members: Ernie Isley; Chris Jasper; Marvin Isley

Isley-Jasper-Isley was a splinter group of the Isley Brothers formed in 1984 by brother-in-law Chris Jasper (keyboards), Ernie Isley (lead guitar), and Marvin Isley (bass), due to creative differences that arose among the group.

== History ==
Ernie Isley, Chris Jasper and Marvin Isley had performed on Isley Brothers recordings since 1969 and as members since the 3 + 3 album in 1973. They left the group in 1984, and released their first album Broadway's Closer to Sunset Blvd later that year.

Isley-Jasper-Isley released two further albums on their CBS Associated Records label, including Caravan of Love. The title hit was a No. 1 on the Billboard R&B charts. "Caravan of Love" was subsequently covered by British band the Housemartins, who made the song an international No. 1 pop hit in 1986. "Caravan of Love" was followed by three other top 20 R&B singles, "Insatiable Woman", "8th Wonder of the World", and "Givin' You Back the Love". The latter two tracks were featured on their final album Different Drummer.

In 1987, Isley-Jasper-Isley disbanded. Younger brothers Marvin and Ernie Isley returned to perform with older brother Ronald Isley. Jasper continued as a solo artist, multi-instrumentalist and producer, forming his own independent record label, Gold City Records. He has since released 14 solo albums, including four gospel albums. He released two albums on his CBS-Associated label, Gold City Records, including the No. 1 R&B hit "Superbad" in 1988.

The Isley-Jasper-Isley half of the group was inducted with the rest of the Isleys in 1992 to the Rock & Roll Hall of Fame and received the Grammy Lifetime Achievement Award in January 2014. Marvin Isley died from complications of diabetes in 2010.

Chris Jasper died of cancer on February 23, 2025.

== Discography ==
=== Albums ===
Year	Title	Peak chart positions		Record label
Year	Title	US	US R&B	Record label
1984	Broadway's Closer to Sunset Blvd	135	28	CBS Associated/Epic
1985	Caravan of Love	77	3	CBS Associated/Epic
1987	Different Drummer	―	40	CBS Associated/Epic
"—" denotes releases that did not chart.

=== Compilation albums ===
- 2003: The Best of Isley-Jasper-Isley: Caravan of Love
- 2010: Broadway's Closer to Sunset Boulevard/Caravan of Love/Different Drummer (double CD)

=== Singles ===
Year	Title	Peak chart positions					Album
Year	Title	US	US R&B	US Dance	US Adult	UK	Album
1984	"Look the Other Way"	―	14	―	―	―	Broadway's Closer to Sunset Blvd
1984	"Kiss and Tell"	63	52	46	―	―	Broadway's Closer to Sunset Blvd
1985	"Caravan of Love"	51	1	―	16	52	Caravan of Love
1985	"Insatiable Woman"	―	13	―	―	90	Caravan of Love
1987	"8th Wonder of the World"	―	18	―	―	―	Different Drummer
1987	"Givin' You Back the Love"	―	15	―	―	―	Different Drummer
"—" denotes releases that did not chart or were not released in that territory.

=== Music videos ===
- 1984: "Kiss & Tell"
- 1984: "Look the Other Way"
- 1985: "Caravan of Love"
- 1985: "Insatiable Woman"
