= Michaela Morgan =

British children's author and poet

Michaela Morgan is a British children's author and poet. She has written more than 200 titles between 1987 and 2025 and publishes between two and three new titles each year. These range from picture books to junior novels.She also writes educational materials. Her work is published internationally.

== Awards ==
Morgan was shortlisted in the Blue Peter Book Award 2013 and named an International Reading Association Children's Choice (2008). She won the United Kingdom Reading Association (now United Kingdom Literacy Association)'s 1995 Award.

In 2008, she was shortlisted in the Birmingham Libraries Award, 2008 for Respect (Barrington Stoke) about the black First World War hero, Walter Tull and the Surrey Libraries Award 2009 for Night Flight.

Respect also won the Libraries Short Read Award.

In poetry Morgan’s Words to Whisper Words to Shout (Belitha Press) was shortlisted for the BBC Blue Peter Award 2002.

She is a National Poetry Day ambassador.

In 2017, Morgan's edited collection of poems, entitled Wonderland: Alice in Poetry, was shortlisted for the Clippa Poetry Award.

== History ==
She started her writing career with the Edward series of picture books in the mid-1980s, having previously worked as a teacher and run her own shop. She works with a wide variety of publishers, though some of her longest running titles have been the Cool Clive books with Oxford University Press.

She has been a key part of other educational series internationally including the Paper Planes Series for Didier, France, the Longman Book Project OUP Incredible English, Collins Big Cat and many others.

She has contributed to many school book weeks, INSET courses, conferences and festivals including the Edinburgh Book Festival, the Chichester Book Festival, the Ledbury Poetry Festival, Bath Children’s Festival and the Wigtown Festival.

She has been keynote speaker at numerous conferences including the UKLA at which she won the award for non-fiction (1996) and the YLG 2025.

Her latest book of poetry is All Together Now illustrated by Nick Sharratt. published by Otter Barry Books in 2025. In 2025 she also published Star! (Troika books) which tells the true-life story of Nadia Nadim.
