= Rotterdam (Or Anywhere) =

1996 single by The Beautiful South

Single by the Beautiful South

from the album Blue Is the Colour
- B-side: "A Minute's Silence"; "Pollard"
- Released: 23 September 1996
- Length: 3:40
- Label: Go! Discs
- Songwriters: Paul Heaton; Dave Rotheray
- Producer: Jon Kelly

The Beautiful South singles chronology
"Pretenders to the Throne" (1995)	"Rotterdam (Or Anywhere)" (1996)	"Don't Marry Her" (1996)

Official video
- "Rotterdam (Or Anywhere)" on YouTube

"Rotterdam (Or Anywhere)" is a song by English pop rock music group the Beautiful South, taken from their fifth studio album, Blue Is the Colour (1996). It was written by Paul Heaton and Dave Rotheray, was produced by Jon Kelly, and features Jacqui Abbott on lead vocals. Released in September 1996 by Go! Discs, the song reached number five on the UK Singles Chart and stayed in the UK top 40 for nine weeks.

== Background ==
Paul Heaton told The Guardian: "I wrote the lyrics to Rotterdam (Or Anywhere) sitting in a bar on the north end of Lijnbaan, Rotterdam's main shopping street. The bar was modern-looking and not friendly at all. It was in January 1996, about three in the afternoon. I'd probably been up all night drinking, I probably smelled, and I'd walked into their bar and plonked my bag down. I wasn't the sort the owners wanted in there. They probably thought: 'Oh God, we don't want this bloke to be our regular. Let’s make sure he never comes back.' So they were trying to think of different excuses to move me on, like: 'You can't sit there, there's a private party coming in.' I got really pissed off – and I wrote a short story that became a very bitchy song, scribbling it down while sitting there."

== Critical reception ==
Jennifer Nine from Melody Maker wrote that the song "is prancingly nagging; maybe it's its unprovoked attack on poor old Rotterdam; maybe it's Jacqueline's voice, a less subtle instrument than her predecessor Brianna's, treacling off [sic] into Eddie Reader-land."

== Music video ==
The music video for "Rotterdam" features Jacqui Abbott walking along an empty British motorway, carrying a vintage Shell fuel can, followed by a series of miscellaneous costumed extras, including a dance troupe, beekeepers, cowboys, a man with a sandwich board, snorkellers and a pantomime cow, with successive groups changing with each verse of the song. Abbott walks on, seemingly oblivious to the following crowd. The rest of the band wait for Abbott while sitting on the back of a vintage blue Chevrolet GMC pick-up truck. Abbott told The Guardian: "The Rotterdam video had a circus theme, and it was filmed on a stretch of disused motorway where they road-tested vehicles. All day, I walked up and down, miming and holding a petrol can, with jugglers and unicyclists behind me. I think the people watching just thought – as we did: 'What the hell is going on?'" Towards the end of the video all of the figures following Abbott give up on the parade with an air of resigned disappointment.

== Usage in sports ==
The song gained prominence as a terrace chant for association football in the United Kingdom. The lyrics at the end of the chorus would be changed to say that the opposing team "get battered, everywhere they go". English supporters were noted to sing this around Wembley Stadium during UEFA Euro 2020, changing the lyrics to "Scotland get battered, everywhere they go". The two countries, which already had a football rivalry, were drawn into the same group during the tournament. West Ham United, while often using the song to deride rivals Tottenham Hotspur or Chelsea F.C., would change the lyrics to "West Ham are massive, everywhere we go" to reflect the club's improved progress during the 2021–22 season.

== Track listings ==
- UK 7-inch and cassette single; European CD single
1. "Rotterdam"
2. "A Minute's Silence"
- UK CD single
1. "Rotterdam"
2. "A Minute's Silence"
3. "Pollard"

== Personnel ==
The Beautiful South

- Jacqui Abbott – vocals
- Dave Rotheray – guitar
- Sean Welch – bass
- Dave Stead – drums

Additional musicians

- Damon Butcher – keyboards, programming, string arrangements
- Martin Ditcham – percussion
- Andy Duncan – percussion, programming

Technical

- John Brough – producer, engineer
- Jon Kelly – producer

== Charts ==
=== Weekly charts ===
Chart (1996–1997)	Peak position
Europe (Eurochart Hot 100)	30
Germany (GfK)	72
Iceland (Íslenski Listinn Topp 40)	19
Ireland (IRMA)	11
Israel (Israeli Singles Chart)	14
Scottish Singles Sales (Official Charts)	5
UK Singles (Official Charts)	5

=== Year-end charts ===
Chart (1996)	Position
UK Singles (Official Charts)	66
UK Airplay (Music Week)	20

== Certifications ==
Region	Certification	Certified units/sales
United Kingdom (BPI)	Platinum	600,000^{‡}
^{‡} Sales+streaming figures based on certification alone.
