= John Williams (music producer) =

English record producer

John Owen Williams (born 1951) is an English A&R executive, record producer, photographer, manager, recording artist, and songwriter. In a career that has spanned over 35 years at major record labels, he has guided, A&R'd, mentored, and produced many artist careers including The Housemartins and The Proclaimers, as well as producing and signing Alison Moyet, Simple Minds, The Waterboys, Robert Plant, The Blue Nile, Status Quo, Cathy Dennis, Petula Clark, Ocean Colour Scene, J. J. Cale, Blancmange, Shriekback, Siouxsie and the Banshees, Jethro Tull, Beth Nielsen Chapman, Debbie Harry and Luciana.

== Early life ==
Williams was born in Wolverhampton, and attended Woodfield Avenue School, Penn, West Midlands. He learned guitar as a teenager and played in school bands at Bromsgrove School. At the University of Western Ontario, he played the folk and coffee bar circuit as a singer-songwriter, and wrote for the University Gazette and The Trouser Press as a rock critic.

== Career ==
Returning to the UK he worked for Polydor in record promotion in 1974 with The Who, The Rubettes, Slade, The Osmonds and Barclay James Harvest, before moving to Island where he promoted Bob Marley and The Wailers, and was label manager for Shelter Records who housed artists such as JJ Cale, Leon Russell, Dwight Twilley, and Tom Petty and the Heartbreakers.

He was music editor of Radio and Record News between 1977 and 1979, before a brief artist career as singer/writer in East Side Band, signed to Mickie Most's RAK Records label, and was a guitarist with The Brians, for Dindisc.

In 1981, he began managing electro duo Blancmange, and became a session producer for BBC Radio One. Over a five-year period he produced sessions for John Peel, Kid Jensen, Janice Long, Peter Powell, including landmark recordings by Aswad, Big Country, Simple Minds, Barrington Levy, Cocteau Twins, Bauhaus, The Birthday Party Killing Joke, The Waterboys, China Crisis, The Housemartins, Southern Death Cult, The Cure, Cookie Crew, The Gymslips, APB, Loudon Wainwright III, the Men They Couldn't Hang, Ludus, and Blue Poland.

In 1985, he joined Chrysalis as senior A&R manager, and produced both The Housemartins albums, including London 0 Hull 4, and the chart topping single "Caravan of Love", signed and produced the debut album by The Proclaimers, This Is the Story, and A&R'd Jethro Tull's Grammy winning Crest of a Knave album.

He became director of A&R at Polydor in 1987, working with Level 42, Sarah Brightman, and Andrew Lloyd Webber, plus signing Cathy Dennis along with The Wonderstuff and Little Angels. He also produced albums by Craig Ferguson, James Taylor Quartet, The Almighty and The High.

Returning to Chrysalis in 1990, he reunited with Jethro Tull and The Proclaimers. During this period he A&R'd albums for both artists and producing albums by Kingmaker and signing Carter the Unstoppable Sex Machine.

From 1995, he began a 10-year tenure with the Sanctuary Group. Running Viper Records, he managed the Coronation Street star Matthew Marsden, and produced chart singles by Joyrider, Blameless, Stereo Nation, and wrote and produced with Matt Prime, Abe Messiah, the cast album from The Tribe TV series, as well as composing the theme music for series two of the six part series.

As senior Vice President of A&R for Sanctuary Records, he worked with Robert Plant, The Blue Nile, Simple Minds, Alison Moyet, Ocean Colour Scene, Status Quo, Gary Jules, before starting W14 Music at Universal and signing The Proclaimers, Level 42, Paul Heaton, The Waterboys, Siouxsie Sioux, and producing Get Happy with jazz singer Clare Teal. After leaving W14, Williams produced and co-wrote Petula Clark's Lost in You album which charted at number 24 in the UK Albums Chart. In 2013, Williams produced Michael Nyman's Piano Sings 2. He also produced Paul Heaton and Jacqui Abbott's What Have We Become?, which debuted at number 3 in the UK Albums Chart in 2014.

In October 2014, Williams co-wrote and produced a new solo album, Where Else (Cherry Red), with Claudia Brucken.

On 30 October 2015, the second Heaton/Abbott collaboration, Wisdom, Laughter and Lines, also produced by Williams, achieved a second UK Top 10 album charting at No. 4. He co- wrote and produced "From Now On" by Petula Clark, released in September 2016, before returning to work with Paul Heaton and Jacqui Abbott on their third album, Crooked Calypso, which entered the UK Albums Chart at No. 2 in July 2017.

John spent most of 2019 in Manchester working at Blueprint Studios in Salford producing the sessions for Paul Heaton and Jacqui Abbott's album Manchester Calling. The album was released 6 March 2020 and debuted at No 1 in the UK ALBUM CHART

In 2021 John released his debut album ‘Out of Darkness’ under the name The John Williams Syndicate.

In 2022 he produced Paul Heaton & Jacqui Abbott chart-topping album ‘N.K-POP’,` and co-written xPropaganda’s Top 10 album ‘The Heart is Strange’.

The John Williams syndicate second album 'Into The Light' follows in the summer of 2023.
