= Don't Marry Her =

1996 single by the Beautiful South

Single by the Beautiful South

from the album Blue Is the Colour
- B-side: "God Bless the Child"; "Without Her"; "Dream a Little Dream"; "Les yeux ouverts"
- Released: 2 December 1996
- Length: 3:23
- Label: Go! Discs
- Songwriters: Paul Heaton; Dave Rotheray
- Producer: Jon Kelly

The Beautiful South singles chronology
"Rotterdam" (1996)	"Don't Marry Her" (1996)	"Blackbird on the Wire" (1997)

Music video
- "Don't Marry Her" on YouTube

"Don't Marry Her" is a song by English pop rock group the Beautiful South and the opening track on their fifth studio album, Blue Is the Colour (1996). It was written by Paul Heaton and Dave Rotheray, and produced by Jon Kelly. Vocalist Jacqui Abbott begs a man to run away with her from the woman he is going to marry and attempts to sway him by describing what she thinks married life with the other woman will be like, painting an uninviting picture. Released on 2 December 1996 by Go! Discs, the single peaked at number eight on the UK Singles Chart and was certified platinum by the British Phonographic Industry.

== Background ==
The song's lyrics were substantially altered for the release as a single – changing from "Don't marry her, fuck me" to "Don't marry her, have me", and with "sweaty bollocks" becoming "Sandra Bullocks". The song spent 10 weeks on the UK Singles Chart, peaking at number eight, and also charted within the lower reaches of several European charts. The single version appears on the best of album Solid Bronze: Great Hits, while Soup features the original album version.

== Critical reception ==
Jennifer Nine from Melody Maker noted the "gleefully repetitive chorus" in the "syrup-and-venom" song. A reviewer from Music Week gave "Don't Marry Her" three out of five, writing, "Some strong guitar riffs appear in this country-tinged follow up to their huge radio hit 'Rotterdam', but Jacqueline Abbott's vocal will be too saccharine for some ears."

== Track listings ==
- UK CD1
1. "Don't Marry Her"
2. "God Bless the Child"
3. "Without Her"
- UK CD2
1. "Don't Marry Her"
2. "Dream a Little Dream"
3. "Les yeux ouverts"
- UK cassette single
1. "Don't Marry Her"
2. "Dream a Little Dream"
3. "God Bless the Child"

== Charts ==
Chart (1996–1997)	Peak position
Belgium (Ultratop 50 Flanders)	50
Europe (Eurochart Hot 100)	41
European Hit Radio (Music & Media)	25
Germany (GfK)	89
Iceland (Íslenski Listinn Topp 40)	30
Ireland (IRMA)	11
Israel (Israeli Singles Chart)	17
Scottish Singles Sales (Official Charts)	3
UK Singles (Official Charts)	8

== Certifications ==
Region	Certification	Certified units/sales
United Kingdom (BPI)	Platinum	600,000^{‡}
^{‡} Sales+streaming figures based on certification alone.
