= Ted Key (musician) =

- Born: Anthony Matthew Key; 1 July 1960 (age 66); Hull, East Riding of Yorkshire, England
- Genres: Indie rock; new wave
- Occupations: Singer; songwriter; musician; Maths Lecturer
- Instruments: Vocals; Bass guitar; Guitar
- Years active: 1983–present

Anthony Matthew "Ted" Key (born 1 July 1960 in Hull, East Riding of Yorkshire, England) was the original bassist in The Housemartins. He was replaced in 1985 by Norman Cook.

Key originally played with a local band called The Gargoyles. He continues to be involved in the Hull music scene and was the frontman of Ted Key and the Kingstons. After this band folded in late 2022, he joined with new musicians including two members of Hull band The Gold Needles, to form Ted Key + The VIP's, who debuted at The New Adelphi Club in early 2023, and are currently active.
