= Think for a Minute =

Single by the Housemartins

from the album London 0 Hull 4
- Released: 1986
- Label: Go! Discs
- Songwriters: Paul Heaton, Stan Cullimore

The Housemartins singles chronology
"Happy Hour" (1986)	"Think for a Minute" (1986)	"Caravan of Love" (1986)

"Think for a Minute" is a single by the Housemartins taken from the album London 0 Hull 4. The song reached number 18 in the UK Singles Chart.

== Charts ==
Chart (1986)	Peak position
Irish Singles Chart	14
Spain (AFYVE)	1
UK Singles Chart	18
