= Wisdom, Laughter and Lines =

Studio album by Paul Heaton and Jacqui Abbott
- Released: 23 October 2015
- Recorded: Blueprint Studios, Salford
- Genre: Alternative, indie rock
- Length: 50:48
- Label: Virgin EMI
- Producer: John Owen Williams

Paul Heaton chronology
What Have We Become? (2014)	Wisdom, Laughter and Lines (2015)	Crooked Calypso (2017)

Jacqui Abbott chronology
What Have We Become? (2014)	Wisdom, Laughter and Lines (2015)	Crooked Calypso (2017)

Singles from Wisdom, Laughter and Lines
- 1. "The Austerity of Love" Released: 3 September 2015; 2. "I Don't See Them" Released: 11 December 2015; 3. "(Man Is) the Biggest Bitch of All" Released: 25 March 2016

Wisdom, Laughter and Lines is the second album by Paul Heaton and Jacqui Abbott. It was released on 23 October 2015 by Virgin EMI and was produced by long-time collaborator John Owen Williams.

The album peaked at no. 4 in the UK Official Album Chart. It was certified Silver by the British Phonographic Industry on 22 January 2016 for sales over 60,000 copies.

== Background ==
Wisdom, Laughter and Lines was announced on 1 September 2015, coinciding with the release of its first single, 'The Austerity of Love' and details regarding its supporting tour.

In the run up to the release of the album, Gigs and Tours interviewed both Paul Heaton and Jacqui Abbott about the album and their working dynamic. Paul mentioned that, “Jacqui is one of the best singers I've worked with and is also part of my past. This new album came together easily because we work so well together. The album title ‘Wisdom, Laughter and Lines’ derives from a line in one of the songs and it sort of sums up where I am in life.”

In the same interview Jacqui talked about preparing to perform the new songs live, stating that “It’s just great to be singing again and I’m excited about playing these new songs live. We had such a good run together previously and it’s just a real pleasure to be working with him again and singing these fantastic songs.”

== Reception ==
Professional ratings
Review scores
Source	Rating
AllMusic	4/5 stars

Contemporary reviews for Wisdom, Laughter and Lines were generally positive. In a four-star review for AllMusic, Marcy Donelson stated, "Songwriter Heaton's comprehensive knowledge of and enthusiasm for pop music is on full display again, with songs that hit on Motown, reggae, honky tonk, post-punk, and Eastern European folk, among other styles."

== Track listing ==
All tracks are written by Paul Heaton, except where noted

No.	Title	Writer(s)	Length
1.	"(Man Is) The Biggest Bitch of All"	Paul Heaton, Jonny Lexus	3:41
2.	"The Austerity of Love"		4:28
3.	"I Don't See Them"		3:34
4.	"Heatongrad"	Heaton, Lexus	3:50
5.	"Sundial in the Shade"	Heaton, Lexus	6:34
6.	"Lonesome and Sad Millionaire"		4:00
7.	"The Queen of Soho"	Heaton, Lexus	3:26
8.	"The Horse and Groom"	Heaton, Lexus	3:42
9.	"When Love for Woman Stops"	Heaton, Lexus	6:03
10.	"No One Wants to Stay"	Heaton, Lexus	3:19
11.	"Wives 1, 2 & 3"		3:23
12.	"You, The Mountain and Me"		4:47

Wisdom, Laughter and Lines – Deluxe edition (bonus tracks)
No.	Title	Writer(s)	Length
13.	"State vs Jeeves"	Heaton, Lexus	3:24
14.	"Real Love"	Heaton, Lexus	3:54
15.	"Fair Share of Breathing"	Heaton, Lexus	4:19
16.	"Capital Love"		3:47
