= Build (song) =

Single by The Housemartins

from the album The People Who Grinned Themselves to Death
- B-side: "Paris In Flares"
- Released: 9 November 1987
- Recorded: 1987
- Length: 4:45
- Label: Go! Discs
- Songwriters: Paul Heaton, Stan Cullimore
- Producers: Major 'Mad' John Williams and The Housemartins

The Housemartins singles chronology
"Me and the Farmer" (1987)	"Build" (1987)	"There Is Always Something There to Remind Me" (1988)

Music video
- "Build" on YouTube

"Build" is a song released in November 1987 as the third single from the album The People Who Grinned Themselves to Death by British band the Housemartins. It reached No. 15 in the UK Singles Chart. The lyrics were inspired by slum clearances and large-scale housebuilding in the north of England.

The song features drummer Dave Hemingway on vocals during the choruses, while usual singer Paul Heaton sings the verses and bridge.

== Charts ==
=== Weekly charts ===
Chart (1987)	Peak position
Belgium (Ultratop Flanders)	27
Ireland (IRMA)	9
Italy Airplay (Music & Media)	17
Netherlands (Single Top 100)	65
New Zealand (Recorded Music NZ)	41
UK Singles (OCC)	15

== In media ==
The song became a big hit in Brazil due to its inclusion in the telenovela Bebê a Bordo as the theme song for main character Ana. The song also became well-known in Brazil because of the chorus "ba-ba-ba-ba build," which is often mistaken for "pa-pa-pa-pa papel".
