= Happy Hour (The Housemartins song) =

1986 single by the Housemartins

Single by The Housemartins

from the album London 0 Hull 4
- B-side: "The Mighty 'Ship"
- Released: 1986
- Genre: Indie rock
- Length: 2:20
- Label: Go! Discs
- Songwriters: Paul Heaton, Stan Cullimore
- Producer: John Williams

The Housemartins singles chronology
"Sheep" (1986)	"Happy Hour" (1986)	"Think for a Minute" (1986)

Official audio
- "Happy Hour" on YouTube

"Happy Hour" is a 1986 single by British indie rock band the Housemartins. It was the third single from the album London 0 Hull 4 and reached number three in the UK singles chart. Vocalist Paul Heaton had been working on the lyrics for some time, with the song originally being called "French England". It was completed on 22 January 1986, the same day "Me and the Farmer" was written. Guitarist Stan Cullimore had a chord progression planned for the verses, but wanted to finish the song quickly in order to go and buy some cakes, so he reused the same chords for the chorus and a quick demo was recorded, the whole process taking less than ten minutes. The lyrics are centred on the expectations of male office workers to participate in social conventions such as happy hour.

The band's first big hit, it stayed on the singles chart for 13 weeks, peaking in the week of 28 June 1986. The song also enjoyed exposure on United States college radio.

Rolling Stone noted that despite "irrepressibly giddy music hooks", the song's "sobering" lyrics "hammer away at the hypocrisy and sexism of young British business types on the move." John Leland in Spin described as a 'pretty fun little single'.

On their 1992 album Gordon, the Barenaked Ladies paid tribute to this song by breaking into it at the end of the song "Hello City".

The video for the song, set in a pub, featured animated plasticine figures of the band members. Comedian Phill Jupitus makes an appearance in the music video, reading a newspaper. It was filmed in The Star in St John's Wood.

== Charts ==
Chart (1986)	Peak position
Dutch Top 40	25
Irish Singles Chart	3
New Zealand Singles Chart	38
UK Singles Chart	3

== Certifications ==
Region	Certification	Certified units/sales
United Kingdom (BPI) Sales since 2004	Platinum	600,000^{‡}
^{‡} Sales+streaming figures based on certification alone.
