= Five Get Over Excited =

Single by The Housemartins

from the album The People Who Grinned Themselves to Death
- Released: 11 May 1987
- Recorded: 1987
- Genre: Rock
- Label: Go! Discs
- Songwriters: Paul Heaton and Stan Cullimore

The Housemartins singles chronology
"Caravan of Love" (1986)	"Five Get Over Excited" (1987)	"Me and the Farmer" (1987)

Five Get Over Excited is a song by The Housemartins released as a single from their album The People Who Grinned Themselves to Death.

The follow-up to their #1 UK hit "Caravan of Love" (albeit preceded by the USA-only release of "Flag Day"), it peaked at #11 on the UK Singles Chart in June 1987.

It was the first single without drummer Hugh Whitaker, who left the band before this song and its album were recorded, but Whitaker appears in the music video for the track, being kidnapped by new drummer Dave Hemingway.

Music writer Rikki Rooksby notes the track's "anti-hyperbolic title" is "positively revolutionary", as the use of hyperbole in pop lyrics is pervasive but never admitted. In 2007, the Manchester Evening News described the tune as "another corking chart hit that stands as a beacon amongst the dross of the 1980s".

== 7 inch single track listing ==
- "Five Get Over Excited"
- "Rebel Without The Airplay"

== 12 inch/cassette single track listing ==
- "Five Get Over Excited"
- "So Glad"
- "Hopelessly Devoted To Them"
- "Rebel Without The Airplay"

== Charts ==
=== Weekly charts ===
Chart (1987)	Peak position
Dutch Singles Chart	96
Irish Singles Chart	4
Italy Airplay (Music & Media)	18
UK Singles Chart	11
