= Caravan of Love =

1985 single by Isley-Jasper-Isley

Single by Isley-Jasper-Isley

from the album Caravan of Love
- B-side: "I Can't Get Over Losin' You"
- Released: 1985
- Recorded: East Orange, New Jersey, 1985
- Length: 5:42
- Label: Epic
- Songwriters: Ernie Isley, Chris Jasper, Marvin Isley
- Producers: Ernie Isley, Chris Jasper, Marvin Isley

"Caravan of Love" is a song originally recorded by American R&B group Isley-Jasper-Isley, the second half of the Isley Brothers' 3 + 3 lineup of the 1970s. A cover version by the British band the Housemartins became an international hit, reaching number one on the UK Singles Chart in 1986.

== Original Isley-Jasper-Isley version ==
After breaking away from the family group, the splinter group including Chris Jasper wrote and produced this single, which was Jasper's interpolation intending to reach audiences by presenting Christian beliefs in his music. The song became the trio's biggest hit, reaching number 1 on the Billboard R&B singles chart and number 51 on the Billboard pop chart in 1985; it would be their only prominent hit before they embarked on solo careers in 1988. The music video was filmed on-location in New York City.

=== Track listings ===
7-inch vinyl single

A. "Caravan of Love" – 4:15
B. "I Can't Get Over Losin' You" – 4:05

12-inch vinyl single

A. "Caravan of Love" – 5:43
B. "I Can't Get Over Losin' You" – 4:05

=== Personnel ===
- Chris Jasper: Keyboards, lead vocals, piano, production
- Ernie Isley: Guitar, drums, backing vocals, production
- Marvin Isley: Bass, backing vocals, production

=== Charts ===
Weekly chart performance for "Caravan of Love"
Chart (1985–1986)	Peak position
Canada Top Singles (RPM)	74
Canada Adult Contemporary (RPM)	24
Netherlands (Dutch Top 40)	21
US Billboard Hot 100	51
US Adult Contemporary (Billboard)	16
US Hot Black Singles (Billboard)	1

== The Housemartins version ==
"Caravan of Love"

Single by the Housemartins
- B-side: "When I First Met Jesus"; "We Shall Not Be Moved"; "So Much in Love"; "Heaven Help Us All (Sermonette)"
- Released: November 24, 1986
- Genre: A cappella
- Length: 3:40
- Label: Go! Discs
- Songwriters: Ernie Isley, Chris Jasper, Marvin Isley
- Producer: John Williams

The Housemartins singles chronology
"Think for a Minute" (1986)	"Caravan of Love" (1986)	"Five Get Over Excited" (1987)

British indie band the Housemartins released "Caravan of Love" on November 24, 1986. The a cappella song was a success, reaching number one on the UK Singles Chart on December 16, 1986 (only the second a cappella recording to do so, after "Only You" by the Flying Pickets in 1983), before being denied the Christmas number one single by a posthumous re-release of Jackie Wilson's "Reet Petite". The song was an international hit, reaching the top three in several countries, including topping the charts of Ireland and Sweden. It is included on the Housemartins' greatest hits compilation Now That's What I Call Quite Good.

=== Track listings ===
7-inch vinyl single

A. "Caravan of Love" – 3:40
B. "When I First Met Jesus" – 2:46

12-inch vinyl single

A1. "Caravan of Love"
A2. "We Shall Not Be Moved"
B1. "When I First Met Jesus"
B2. "So Much in Love"
B3. "Heaven Help Us All (Sermonette)"

=== Charts ===
==== Weekly charts ====
Weekly chart performance for "Caravan of Love"
Chart (1986–1987)	Peak position
Australia (Kent Music Report)	24
Austria (Ö3 Austria Top 40)	7
Belgium (Ultratop 50 Flanders)	5
European Hot 100 Singles (Music & Media)	9
Ireland (IRMA)	1
Netherlands (Dutch Top 40)	3
Netherlands (Single Top 100)	3
New Zealand (Recorded Music NZ)	2
Norway (VG-lista)	2
Spain (AFYVE)	4
Sweden (Sverigetopplistan)	1
Switzerland (Schweizer Hitparade)	2
UK Singles (Official Charts)	1
West Germany (GfK)	2

==== Year-end charts ====
1986 year-end chart performance for "Caravan of Love"
Chart (1986)	Position
UK Singles (OCC)	19

1987 year-end chart performance for "Caravan of Love"
Chart (1987)	Position
Belgium (Ultratop 50 Flanders)	58
European Hot 100 Singles (Music & Media)	38
Netherlands (Dutch Top 40)	40
Netherlands (Single Top 100)	24
New Zealand (RIANZ)	13
Switzerland (Schweizer Hitparade)	19
West Germany (Media Control)	16

== Certifications ==
Certificatios for "Caravan of Love"
Region	Certification	Certified units/sales
United Kingdom (BPI)	Gold	500,000^{^}
^{^} Shipments figures based on certification alone.

== Pixie Lott version ==
In November 2014, British pop singer Pixie Lott released a charity version of the song as the lead single from her first hits collection, Platinum Pixie: Hits. The song charted at number 129 on the UK Singles Chart.
