= The Housemartins =

1983–1988 English indie rock group

- From left: Dave Hemingway, Paul Heaton, Norman Cook, Stan Cullimore

Background information
- Also known as: The Fish City Five
- Origin: Hull, England
- Genres: Indie pop; indie rock; jangle pop
- Years active: 1983–1988
- Labels: Go! Discs, Elektra
- Spinoffs: The Beautiful South; Beats International
- Past members: Paul Heaton; Stan Cullimore; Hugh Whitaker; Ted Key; Norman Cook; Dave Hemingway

The Housemartins were an English indie rock group formed in Hull in 1983. They released two studio albums, London 0 Hull 4 (1986) and The People Who Grinned Themselves to Death (1987), and the compilation album Now That's What I Call Quite Good (1988), all of which went top-ten in the UK. The band also achieved six UK top-twenty singles, including an a cappella cover version of "Caravan of Love" (originally by Isley-Jasper-Isley) which reached number one in the UK in December 1986. Many of their lyrics conveyed a mixture of socialist politics and Christianity, reflecting the beliefs of the band (the back cover of London 0 Hull 4 contained the message, "Take Jesus – Take Marx – Take Hope").

The original members were singer Paul Heaton, guitarist Stan Cullimore, drummer Hugh Whitaker, and bassist Ted Key, with Norman Cook replacing Key in 1985 and Dave Hemingway replacing Whitaker in 1987. After breaking up in 1988, Heaton and Hemingway formed the Beautiful South, Cullimore became an author of children's books and Cook became an electronic dance music DJ and producer, founding the groups Beats International, Pizzaman, and Freak Power, before rebranding himself as Fatboy Slim.

== Career ==
=== Formation ===
The band was formed in late 1983 by Paul Heaton (vocals, billed as "P.d. Heaton") and Stan Cullimore (guitar), initially as a busking duo. The pair recorded a demo tape with Ingo Dewsnap and Sharon Green of Les Zeiga Fleurs which brought them to the attention of Go! Discs. The band often referred to themselves as "the fourth best band in Hull" - various candidates have been cited for the three better bands, including Red Guitars, Everything but the Girl, and the Gargoyles.

With the start of the UK miners' strike in 1984, Heaton felt the angrier political songwriting that resulted from this required a full band lineup. The band recruited the rhythm section from fellow Hull band The Gargoyles, initially recruiting guitarist Ted Key on bass, who then persuaded his bandmate Hugh Whitaker to join on drums. The band's first live performance as a four-piece was at Hull University in October 1984. For these early performances Roger "Dodger" Wilde (on loan from local Hull band 3-Action!) was used before eventually being replaced by Hugh Whitaker.

=== John Peel sessions, London 0 Hull 4 and "Caravan of Love" ===
Key left at the end of 1985, after recording the band's first John Peel session and the band's first single "Flag Day", saying he felt isolated in the writing process for the band's first album. Heaton invited Norman Cook (later known as Fatboy Slim), who had been a member of Heaton's teenage band the Stomping Pond Frogs and had played on some early Housemartins demos, to replace Key.

In 1986, having recorded a second John Peel session, the band broke through with their third single "Happy Hour", which reached No. 3 in the UK Singles Chart. The single's success was helped by a claymation animated pop promo of a type that was in vogue at the time, featuring a cameo by comedian Phill Jupitus, who toured with the band under his stage name of "Porky the Poet". Their debut album, London 0 Hull 4, was released later in 1986 and contained their previous two singles as well as alternative versions of first single "Flag Day" and follow-up to Happy Hour, "Think for a Minute".

At the end of 1986 they had their only UK No. 1 single on 16 December with a cover version of Isley-Jasper-Isley's "Caravan of Love". The single was pipped to the Christmas number 1 by Jackie Wilson's "Reet Petite", which the band later attributed to the track being pulled from the BBC Radio 1 playlist following a sexual reference to the then prime minister, Margaret Thatcher, and her husband Denis, made by one of the band in a radio interview.

"Caravan of Love" was first performed by the Housemartins during their second Peel session for BBC Radio 1 in April 1986, prior to the song's chart success.

=== The People Who Grinned Themselves to Death ===
Drummer Hugh Whitaker left in 1987 on amicable terms, and suggested his school friend Dave Hemingway as replacement.

The Housemartins' second album The People Who Grinned Themselves to Death was released in September 1987, and included their two previous singles "Five Get Over Excited" and "Me and the Farmer". A third single from the album, "Build", was released in November, and a final Peel Session from the same month provided a recording used for their final single.

=== Breakup and post-breakup activities ===
Following the release of their last single "There Is Always Something There to Remind Me" in April 1988, the Housemartins announced that the band was splitting up. A farewell compilation album, Now That's What I Call Quite Good was released later that year.

The members of the band have remained in contact and have worked on each other's projects. Norman Cook has enjoyed significant success with Beats International and then as Fatboy Slim, while Heaton, Hemingway and roadie Sean Welch formed The Beautiful South.

A 2003 single called "Change the World" was credited to Dino Lenny vs The Housemartins. It was a radically remixed dance version of the band's first single, "Flag Day", and peaked at UK #51. The remix was done without the band's involvement.

In August 2009, Mojo magazine arranged for The Housemartins' debut album line-up (Heaton, Cullimore, Cook and Whitaker) to get together for a photo-shoot and interview, for the first time in many years, but in the interview all the members maintained that the band would not re-form.

Cullimore became a children's author, and in December 2009 co-wrote songs for (and appeared in) a pre-school music series called The Bopps, which first showed on Nick Jr. in the UK in April 2010. Cullimore and Whitaker joined Heaton on stage during a show by Heaton and Jacqui Abbott in 2014 at Hull's The New Adelphi Club, on the stage where the band had signed their Go-Discs record contract. The trio performed the Housemartins hit "Me and the Farmer", and Cullimore and Heaton closed the show with a performance of "Caravan of Love".

In June 2024, Heaton performed on the Pyramid Stage at the Glastonbury Festival, and was joined by Cook on bass for a performance of "Happy Hour".

== Musical style and lyrics ==
The band's early releases saw them described as jangle pop, which brought comparisons with bands such as The Smirks, The Smiths and Aztec Camera. David Quantick, writing for Spin, described them in 1986 as playing "traditional '60s-style guitar pop overlaid with soul vocals". Cook described the band as "religious, but not Christians", and the band's repertoire included gospel songs.

Many of the band's lyrics have socialist themes, with Cook stating that "Paul realised that he hated writing about love...and that writing politically came easier to him", describing some of their songs as "angrily political".

== Band members ==
=== Final lineup ===
- Paul Heaton – vocals, harmonica, guitar, trombone (1983–1988)
- Stan Cullimore – guitar, vocals (1983–1988)
- Norman Cook – bass, vocals (1985–1988)
- Dave Hemingway – drums, vocals (1987–1988)

=== Former members ===
- Ted Key – bass, vocals (1984–1985)
- Hugh Whitaker – drums, vocals (1985–1987)

== Discography ==
=== Albums ===
Year	Album details	Peak chart positions						Certifications
Year	Album details	UK	AUS	NZL	SWE	NOR	US	Certifications
1986	London 0 Hull 4: Released: October 1986; Label: Go! Discs	3	35	21	3	9	124	BPI: Platinum
1987	The People Who Grinned Themselves to Death: Released: September 1987; Label: Go! Discs	9	56	34	25	—	177	BPI: Gold
"—" denotes releases that did not chart.

=== Compilation albums ===
Year	Title	UK	Certifications	Record label
1986	The Housemartins Christmas Box Set	84		
1988	Now That's What I Call Quite Good	8	BPI: Gold	Go! Discs
2004	The Best of the Housemartins	29	BPI: Silver	Go! Discs/Mercury
2006	Live at the BBC	―		Universal
2007	Soup	15	BPI: 2× Platinum	Mercury
"—" denotes releases that did not chart.

=== Singles ===
Year	Title	Peak chart positions										Certifications	Album
Year	Title	UK	IRL	NZL	NLD	BEL	SWI	AUT	SWE	NOR	AUS	Certifications	Album
1985	"Flag Day"	—	—	—	—	—	—	—	—	—	—		London 0 Hull 4
1986	"Sheep"	56	—	—	—	—	—	—	—	—	97		London 0 Hull 4
1986	"Happy Hour"	3	3	38	25	23	—	—	—	—	—	BPI: Platinum	London 0 Hull 4
1986	"Think for a Minute"	18	14	—	—	—	—	—	—	—	—		London 0 Hull 4
1986	"Caravan of Love"	1	1	2	3	5	2	7	1	2	24	BPI: Gold	Non-album single
1987	"Five Get Over Excited"	11	4	—	96	—	—	—	—	—	—		The People Who Grinned Themselves to Death
1987	"Me and the Farmer"	15	4	—	—	—	—	—	—	—	—		The People Who Grinned Themselves to Death
1987	"Build"	15	9	41	65	27	—	—	—	—	—		The People Who Grinned Themselves to Death
1988	"There Is Always Something There to Remind Me"	35	17	—	—	—	—	—	—	—	—		Now That's What I Call Quite Good
2003	"Change the World" (as Dino Lenny vs The Housemartins)	51	—	—	—	—	—	—	—	—	—		Non-album single
"—" denotes releases that did not chart or were not released in that territory.

== Videography ==
(does not include "live" appearances on TV programmes)

- "Sheep"
- "Happy Hour"
- "Think for a Minute"
- "Caravan of Love"
- "Five Get Over Excited"
- "Me and the Farmer"
- "Build"
- "There Is Always Something There to Remind Me"
- "We're Not Deep"

== Biography ==
- Swift, Nick (1988). The Housemartins: Now That's What I Call Quite Good. Tales from Humberside. ISBN 0-7119-1517-2.
