= Jacqui Abbott =

English pop rock singer (born 1973)

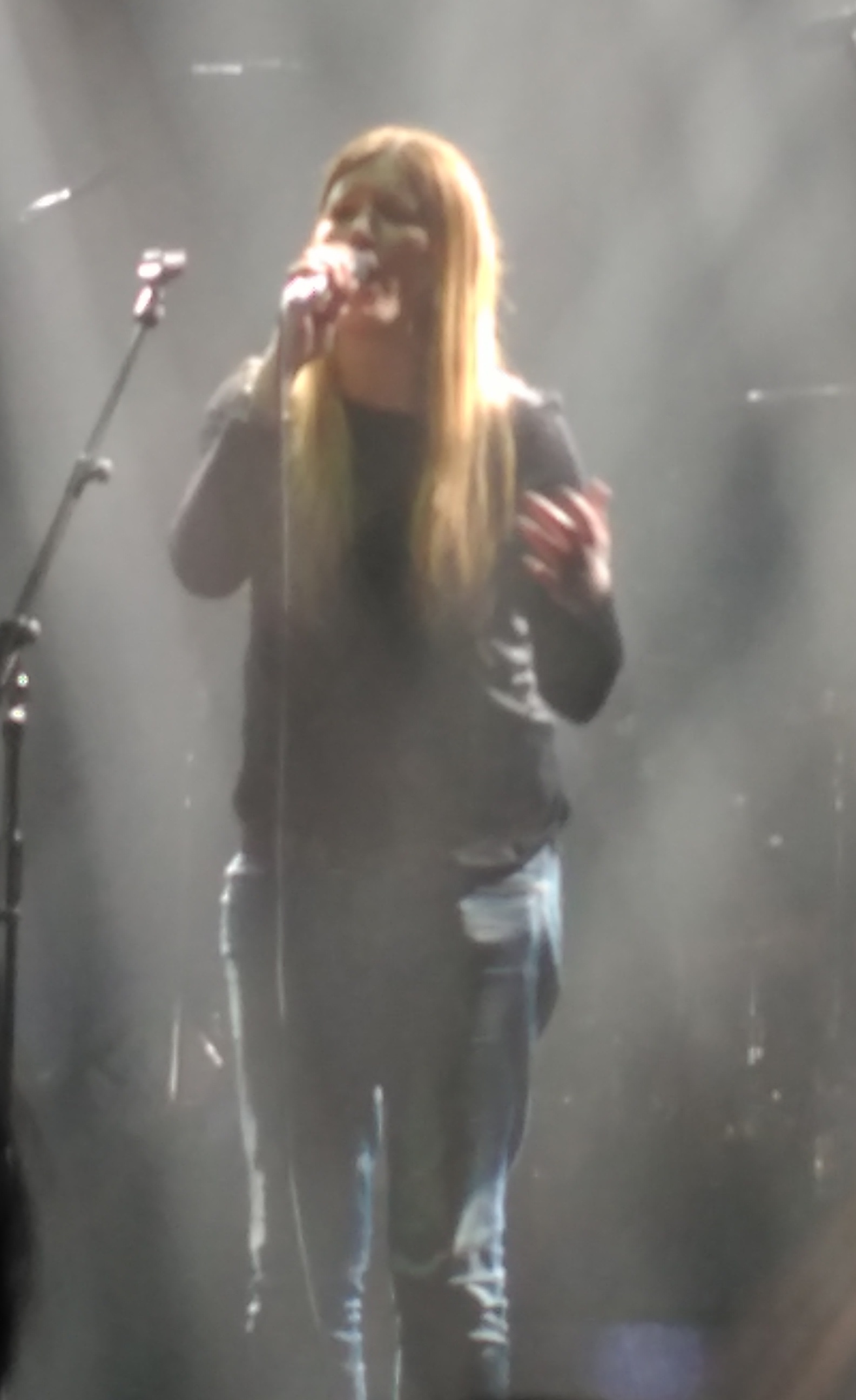
- Abbott performing at the O2 Apollo, Manchester, in 2016

Background information
- Born: Jacqueline Abbott; 10 November 1973 (age 53); St Helens, Lancashire, England
- Genres: Indie pop; pop; alternative rock
- Occupations: Singer & photographer
- Instrument: Vocals
- Years active: 1993–present
- Formerly of: The Beautiful South

Jacqueline Abbott (born 10 November 1973) is an English singer who was a vocalist with The Beautiful South from 1993 to 2000, following the departure of Briana Corrigan.

== Early life ==
She originated from Sutton, St Helens, and attended the former Grange Park Community High School, which merged in 1991 to become the Broadway High School, which subsequently closed in 2006.

== Career ==
She first met the band in the week before they played Sherdley Park on 26 July 1991. She was phoned by the band in August 1993, aged 19.

The band released several top-10 singles with Abbott. Among their most successful during her stint were "Rotterdam (or Anywhere)", "Perfect 10", "Don't Marry Her" and "Dream a Little Dream of Me". Abbott was discovered by Beautiful South co-founder Paul Heaton after she and a friend met him outside a nightclub. Heaton invited them to a party, where Abbott's friend encouraged her to sing. Heaton was impressed with her singing, and later invited her to audition to replace Corrigan.

Abbott left the band in 2000, because of the pressure of touring: a busy schedule would have conflicted with her wish to concentrate on looking after her son, who had been diagnosed with autism.

Abbott reunited with Heaton in June 2011 to perform in his musical The 8th. In 2013 they recorded a new album, What Have We Become? released on 19 May 2014. This was followed by a second album in 2015 entitled Wisdom, Laughter and Lines. They embarked on a tour in 2016. Their third album, Crooked Calypso, was released in July 2017, with a tour beginning later that year. In 2020, Heaton and Abbott again collaborated on Manchester Calling, their first UK number-one album as a duo.

== Discography ==
=== Albums ===
List of albums, with selected details, chart positions and certifications
Title	Details	Peak chart positions		Certifications
Title	Details	UK	IRE	Certifications
What Have We Become? (with Paul Heaton)	Released: 12 May 2014; Label: Virgin EMI; Formats: CD, cassette, LP	3	26	BPI: Gold
Wisdom, Laughter and Lines (with Paul Heaton)	Released: 23 October 2015; Label: Virgin EMI; Formats: CD, cassette, LP	4	39	BPI: Silver
Crooked Calypso (with Paul Heaton)	Released: 21 July 2017; Label: Virgin EMI; Formats: CD, cassette, LP	2	10	
Manchester Calling (with Paul Heaton)	Released: 6 March 2020; Label: Virgin EMI; Formats: CD, LP	1	3	
N.K-Pop (with Paul Heaton)	Released: 7 October 2022; Label: EMI; Formats: CD, LP	1	4	

=== Singles ===
List of singles, with selected chart positions
Title	Year	Peak chart positions	Album
Title	Year	UK	Album
"DIY" (with Paul Heaton)	2014	75	What Have We Become?
"Moulding of a Fool" (with Paul Heaton)	2014	—	What Have We Become?
"When It Was Ours" (with Paul Heaton)	2014	—	What Have We Become?
"Real Hope" (with Paul Heaton)	2014	—	What Have We Become?
"The Austerity of Love" (with Paul Heaton)	2015	—	Wisdom, Laughter and Lines
"I Don't See Them" (with Paul Heaton)	2015	—	Wisdom, Laughter and Lines
"(Man Is) The Biggest Bitch of All" (with Paul Heaton)	2016	—	Wisdom, Laughter and Lines
"I Gotta Praise" (with Paul Heaton)	2017	—	Crooked Calypso
"She Got the Garden" (with Paul Heaton)	2017	—	Crooked Calypso
"He Wants To" (with Paul Heaton)	2017	—	Crooked Calypso
"You and Me (Were Meant to Be Together)" (with Paul Heaton)	2020	—	Manchester Calling
"Still" (with Paul Heaton)	2022	—	N.K-Pop
"—" denotes a release that did not chart or was not released in that territory.
