= Stan Cullimore =

English musician, author and composer

Ian Peter Cullimore is an English musician and journalist. He played guitar, between 1983 and 1988, for the Hull-based indie rock band the Housemartins.

== Early life ==
He was born in Stapleford, Cambridgeshire. He moved to Birmingham, where he went to school at King Edward VI Camp Hill School for Boys, a state grammar school. He studied Maths at the University of Hull from 1980, graduating in 1984.

== Career ==
=== Music ===
Cullimore responded to a local newspaper advertisement by the Housemartins singer Paul Heaton seeking musicians in 1983. Most of the band's songs were written by Heaton and Cullimore. After leaving the band, Cullimore ran a whole food shop for about five years.

=== Journalism and writing ===
Cullimore went on to become a journalist and the author of many children's books. He has written for publications such as the Hull Daily Mail and the Bristol Post.

He began working as a journalist in 2014 and wrote a column in a local Bristol paper. Alongside this he has been working with AuthorsAbroad, teaching young children creative writing and music.
