= Portstewart =

Town in County Londonderry, Northern Ireland

Coordinates: 55.18°N 6.711°W

Portstewart: Irish: Port Stíobhaird
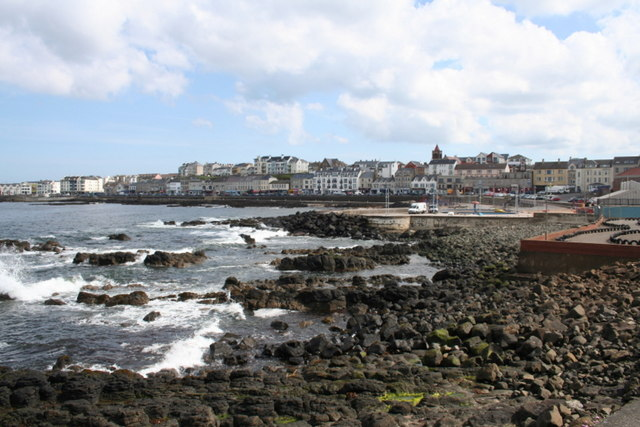

- Location within Northern Ireland
- Population: 7,854 (2021)
- District: Causeway Coast and Glens
- County: County Londonderry
- Country: Northern Ireland
- Sovereign state: United Kingdom
- Post town: PORTSTEWART
- Postcode district: BT55
- Dialling code: 028
- Police: Northern Ireland
- Fire: Northern Ireland
- Ambulance: Northern Ireland
- UK Parliament: East Londonderry
- NI Assembly: East Londonderry

Portstewart is a small seaside town in County Londonderry, Northern Ireland. It had a population of 7,854 people in the 2021 United Kingdom census. It is a seaside resort, neighbouring both Coleraine in County Londonderry and Portrush in County Antrim. Its harbour and scenic coastal paths form an Atlantic promenade leading to a two-mile beach (Portstewart Strand), popular with holidaymakers in summer and surfers year-round. The town is located within the Barony of the North East Liberties of Coleraine.

== Profile ==
Portstewart was a popular holiday destination for Victorian middle-class families. Its long, crescent-shaped seafront promenade is sheltered by rocky headlands. It is a reasonably prosperous town. Most of the town is contained in the Strand electoral ward and this is one of the most affluent areas in Northern Ireland. In a deprivation index of electoral wards in Northern Ireland the Strand Ward in the town was ranked 570th out of the 582 wards.

House prices in Portstewart have been amongst the highest in Northern Ireland. According to the University of Ulster's Quarterly House Price Index report, produced in partnership with the Bank of Ireland and the Northern Ireland Housing Executive, in the fourth quarter of 2010, the North Coast region (Coleraine/Limavady area) had higher property prices than those of affluent south Belfast.

Portstewart is one of the most integrated towns in Northern Ireland with the religious demographics similar to the population of Northern Ireland as a whole. Community relations are generally good within the town. Dominican College, a Catholic grammar school, is one of the main schools in the area.

== History ==
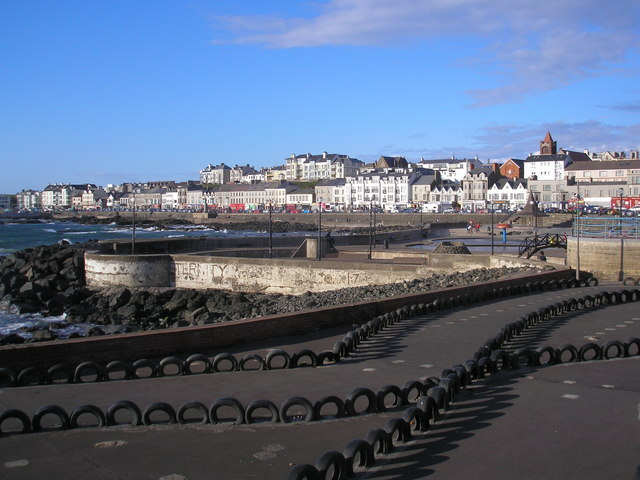
Portstewart seafront.

Portstewart was founded in 1792 by John Cromie, who named it after his maternal ancestors, the Stewarts of Ballylesse. A Lieutenant Stewart is said to have obtained a lease of land from The 5th Earl of Antrim (first creation; 1713–1775) in 1734. Prior to this, the area was formerly known in Irish as Port na Binne Uaine, a name related to the nearby island and townland of Benoney (an anglicisation of Binne Uaine). The name Port na Binne Uaine is still used today as the Irish language name of the town, alongside the Gaelicised version Port Stíobhaird.

Portstewart developed to a modest size seaside resort in the mid 19th century under the influence of a local landlord, John Cromie. Its development and character was influenced greatly by the Sabbatarian sensitivities of the Cromies and the consequent resistance to a railway connection in the mid 19th century.

== Places of interest ==
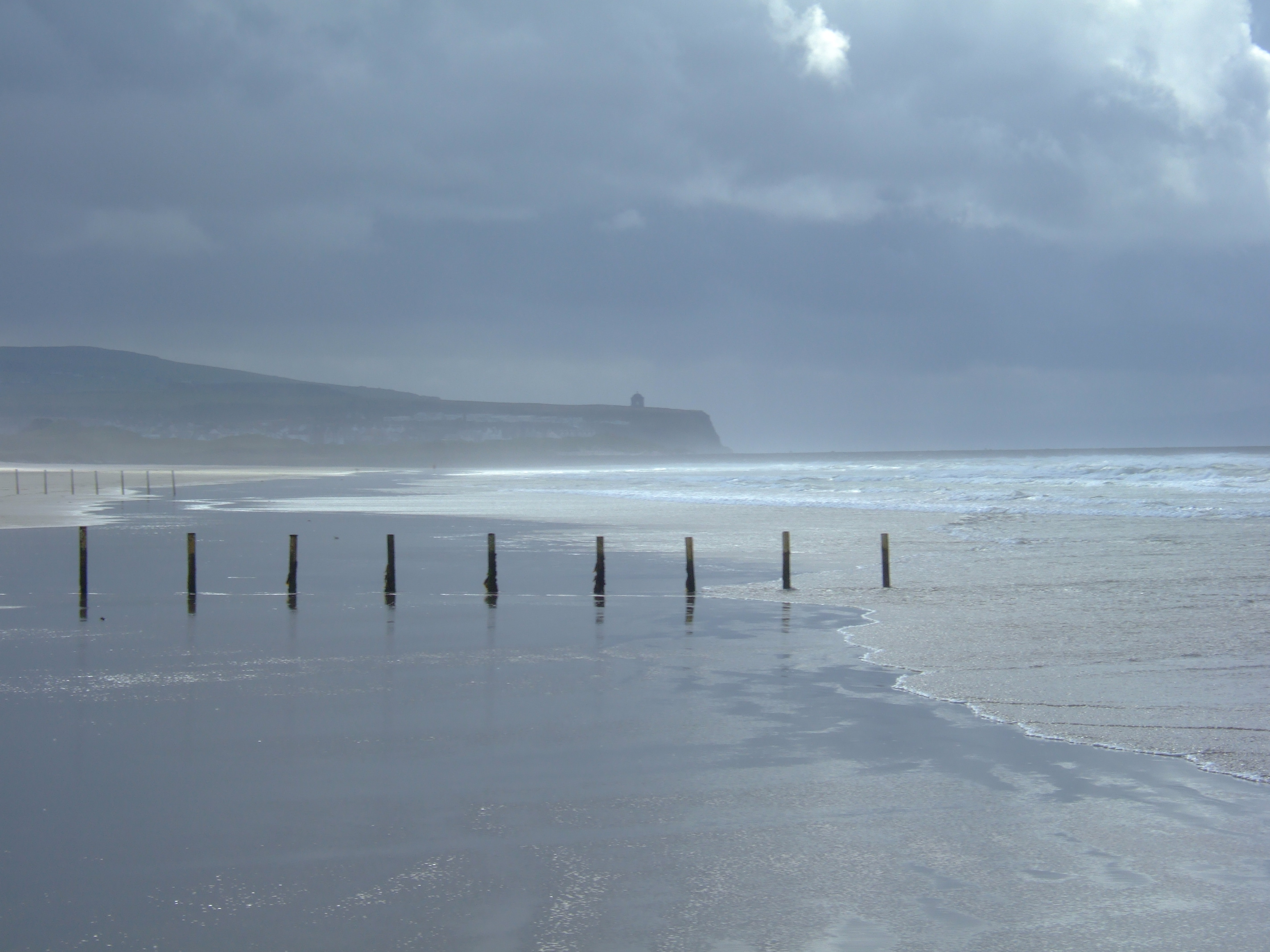
The Strand, looking west to the Barmouth and Mussenden Temple beyond.

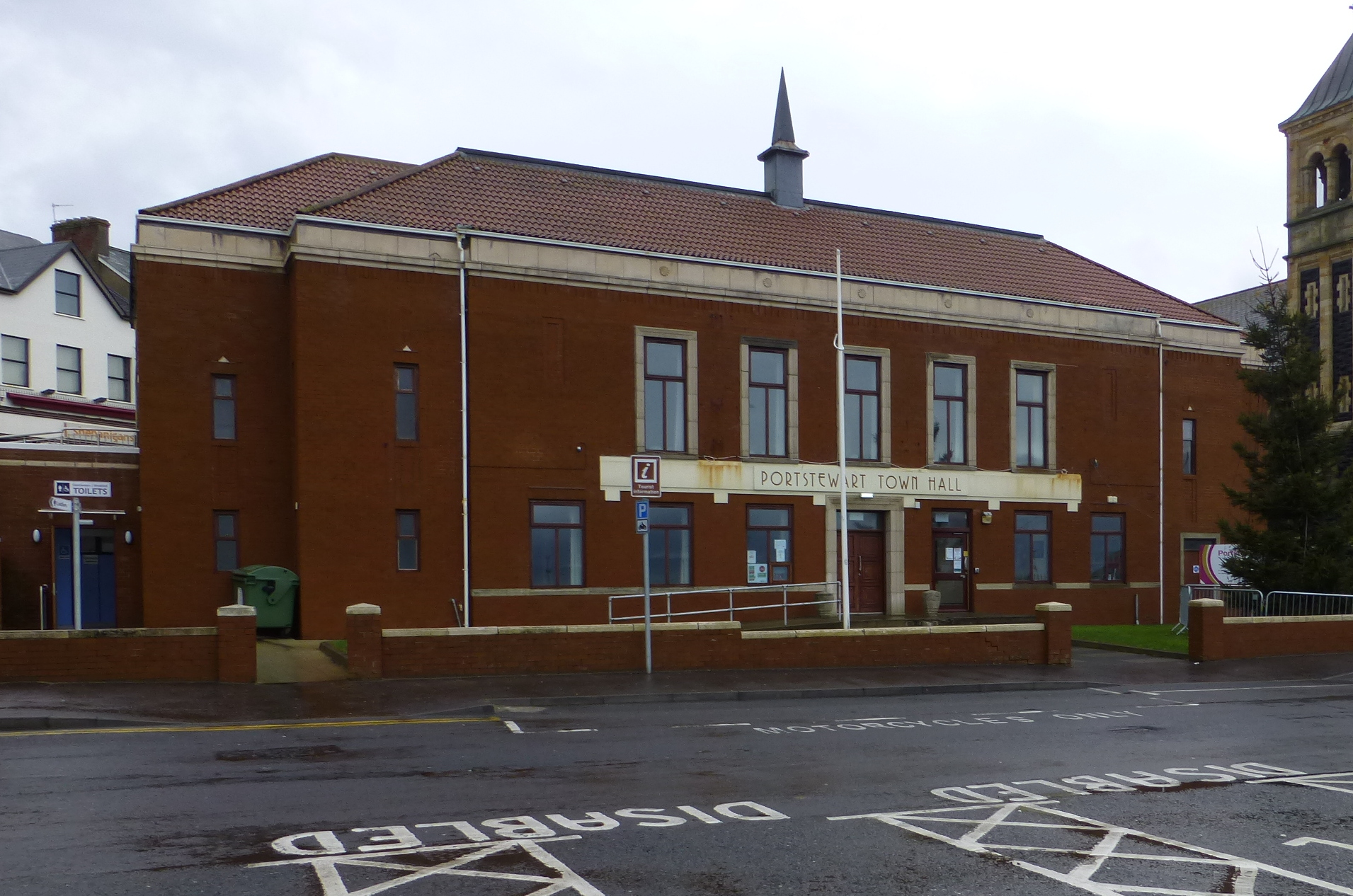
Portstewart Town Hall

- Portstewart has a Dominican convent (an imposing Gothic mansion) with the attached Dominican College sitting on the edge of a cliff which dominates the western end of the Promenade. The site, formerly known as "O'Hara's Castle", was built in 1834 and bought by the Dominican Order in 1917 to be a centre of education in the north west of Ireland.
- Just west of the town stretches Portstewart Strand, a clean two-mile long blue flag beach, protected by the National Trust.
- Beneath the convent is a cliff path which stretches along the coast from the Promenade to Portstewart Strand. From here it is a popular walk to the Barmouth, where the Bann flows out into the Atlantic Ocean. The cliff path has panoramic views across the Strand and Downhill, with Inishowen in County Donegal in the background.
- Portstewart Town Hall was completed in 1934.

== Transport ==
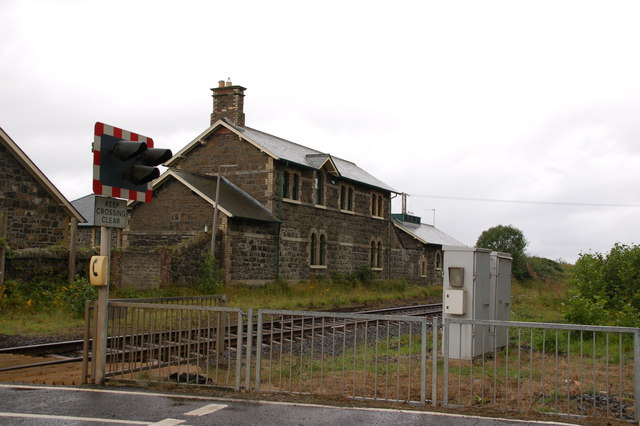
Cromore station near Portstewart.

Portstewart is near the Portrush branch line from Coleraine to Portrush, opened by the Ballymena, Ballymoney, Coleraine and Portrush Junction Railway in 1856, which was later absorbed into the Belfast and Northern Counties Railway (later Northern Counties Committee) in 1861. There was an intermediate station called Portstewart although it was about a mile from the town. The town was connected to the station by the Portstewart Tramway from 1882 to 1926. After closure of the tramway, the station saw few passengers eventually closing in 1963. It re-opened as Cromore in 1969 when the branch was upgraded but closed again in 1988. The station building has been sold and is now a private house.

Today there is no longer a station in Portstewart, but the nearest ones are Coleraine, University, Dhu Varren and Portrush with Northern Ireland Railways providing connections west to Castlerock and Derry~Londonderry railway station and east to Belfast Lanyon Place railway station and Belfast Grand Central station. Ulsterbus provide connections to the trains at Coleraine railway station.

== Sport ==
- The town is home to three golf courses (under one club – Portstewart Golf Club), made lively by the forceful Atlantic wind. Portstewart has one of the few 54-hole complexes in Europe. The championship links Strand course is set amidst imposing sand dunes with panoramic views across the Atlantic mouth of Lough Foyle to the Inishowen peninsula beyond. The Strand Course hosted the Dubai Duty Free Irish Open in 2017 for the first time in the club's history and was the biggest event staged in the town ever attracting crowds of 92,000+.
- Portstewart F.C. are an intermediate football club playing in the NIFL Premier Intermediate League.
- Every May, the North West 200 motorcycle race passes through the town, with the starting grid and pit area on the coastal road between Portrush and Portstewart. The circuit between the towns of Portrush, Portstewart and Coleraine is one of the fastest in the world, with top speeds exceeding 200 mph on public roads. It is one of the last such classic races held in Europe. Drawing crowds of over 150,000, it is the largest outdoor sporting event on the island of Ireland.
- CLG Eoghan Rua, Coleraine, is the local Gaelic Athletic Association club and the playing grounds are just outside Portstewart.
- Portstewart also hosts matches in the Super Cup NI.

== People ==
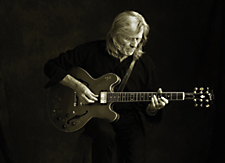
Henry McCullough

- Field Marshal Sir George White, VC (1835–1912) – commanded the garrison at the Siege of Ladysmith during the Second Boer War, was born at Low Rock Castle.
- Jimmy Kennedy (1902–1984) – songwriter; inspired by one of the town's sunsets when he wrote "Red Sails in the Sunset". He was born in Omagh but grew up in Portstewart.
- Harry Gregg (1932–2020) – former Northern Ireland footballer, used to own a hotel in the town.
- Sean Farren (born 1939) – Social Democratic and Labour Party politician and former member of the Northern Ireland Assembly, lives in Portstewart.
- Robert Anthony Welch (1946–2013) – author, academic and literary historian
- Henry McCullough (1943–2016) – guitarist.
- Harry Mullan (1946–1999), boxing writer.
- Billy Leonard (born 1955) – Sinn Féin politician and former member of the Northern Ireland Assembly; lives in Portstewart.
- Briana Corrigan (born 1965) – vocalist with The Beautiful South and the lead female vocalist on a number one single in 1990, "A Little Time". She grew up in Portstewart.
- Jimeoin (McKeown) (born 1966) – comedian.
- Helen Mulholland – whiskey distiller and master blender

== Demography ==
=== 2011 Census ===
On Census day (27 March 2011) there were 8,003 people living in Portstewart (3,338 households), accounting for 0.44% of the NI total. The Census 2011 population represented an increase of 2.6% on the Census 2001 figure of 7,803. Of the Census 2011 population:

- 14.77% were aged under 16 years and 18.94% were aged 65 and over;
- 52.73% of the usually resident population were female and 47.27% were male;
- 56.98% belong to or were brought up in a 'Protestant and Other Christian (including Christian related)' faith and 35.54% belong to or were brought up in the Catholic Christian faith;
- 51.56% indicated that they had a British national identity, 35.17% had a Northern Irish national identity and 22.15% had an Irish national identity (respondents could indicate more than one national identity);
- 38 years was the average (median) age of the population;
- 13.36% had some knowledge of Ulster-Scots and 9.90% had some knowledge of Irish (Gaelic).

=== 2021 Census ===
On Census day (2021) there were 7,854 people living in Portstewart. Of the Census 2021 population:

- 51.96% belong to or were brought up in a 'Protestant and Other Christian (including Christian related)' faith and 35.13% belong to or were brought up in the Catholic Christian faith.
- 46.54% indicated that they had a British national identity, 40.21% had a Northern Irish national identity and 27.03% had an Irish national identity (respondents could indicate more than one national identity).

== Education ==
- Dominican College, Portstewart
- St. Colum's Primary School
- Portstewart Primary School

== See also ==
- List of localities in Northern Ireland by population
- List of tourist attractions in Ireland
