= 0898 Beautiful South =

Studio album by the Beautiful South
- Released: 30 March 1992
- Studios: AIR (London, England)
- Genre: Sophisti-pop
- Length: 50:36
- Label: Go!
- Producer: Jon Kelly

The Beautiful South chronology
Choke (1990)	0898 Beautiful South (1992)	Miaow (1994)

Singles from 0898 Beautiful South
- 1. "Old Red Eyes Is Back" Released: 30 December 1991; 2. "We Are Each Other" Released: 2 March 1992; 3. "Bell Bottomed Tear" Released: 1 June 1992; 4. "36D" Released: 14 September 1992

0898 Beautiful South, also referred to as 0898, is the third studio album by English band the Beautiful South. After the success of their previous work over 1989–1991, the band hired prolific record producer Jon Kelly and recorded the album at AIR Studios in London. The album contains a more "muscular" yet sometimes more sombre sound than their previous albums, although still entirely retains lyricist Paul Heaton's witty and bitter lyrical style. The album "deals in fragile melodies and harmonies, soulful but low-key instrumentation, and lyrics full of subtle social commentary and humour." The album title refers to the 0898 premium rate telephone prefix associated with sex hotlines in the UK at the time.

The album was released in March 1992 by the band's record label Go! Discs. Four singles were released from the album, two of them prior to its release; "Old Red Eyes Is Back", "We Are Each Other", "Bell Bottomed Tear" and "36D". It reached number 4 on the UK Album Chart, unlike their previous two albums which reached number 2; the record company blamed this on the cover which showed ladies' faces on the back of terrapins' shells. While the first two singles – "Old Red Eyes Is Back" and "We Are Each Other" – charted in the UK at No. 22 and No. 30 respectively, third single "Bell Bottomed Tear" was the only Top 20 hit from the album, reaching No. 16. "36D" was a relative disappointment after this success, only managing No. 46 in the singles charts. "We Are Each Other" was also a success on American alternative rock radio and peaked at No. 10 on the Billboard Modern Rock Tracks chart in 1992. It was the band's biggest hit in the United States.

The album was a critical success, with reviewers praising its production, lyrics and distinct tone, although some critics recognise the album as being underrated. The album appeared on numerous lists of the best albums of 1992; Vox ranked it 18th, NME ranked it 44th and Robert Christgau placed it 53rd. The album was certified "Gold" by the British Phonographic Industry (BPI) for sales of over 200,000 copies.

== Background and recording ==
After forming in 1989, the Beautiful South's debut album Welcome to the Beautiful South, released October the same year, was a major chart success, reaching number 2 in the UK Albums Chart and featuring two top 10 hits, "Song For Whoever" and "You Keep It All In". Featuring Paul Heaton's witty lyrics and vocals from him, Dave Hemingway and Briana Corrigan, it was a critical success too, being widely hailed for "reinserting cynicism, doubt, and biting sarcasm into pop music." The album was a transformation for lead singer and lyricist Paul Heaton after his previous band the Housemartins; according to Robert Christgau, he turned "his talents to the interpersonal. The surprise was that he didn't then cop out." The third single from the album, "I'll Sail This Ship Alone", reached number 31.

Working in a short space of time, the band quickly released their second album Choke a year later in October 1990. Although it reached number 2 in the UK Albums Chart, it was not as much a critical success as its predecessor, despite drawing favourable reviews. Two singles from the album, "My Book" and "Let Love Speak Up Itself", charted outside the Top 40 of the UK Singles Chart, but the album also provided the band's only number 1 hit, a Hemingway/Corrigan duet called "A Little Time", and its music video, featuring the aftermath of a domestic fight, won the 1991 BRIT Award for Best Video.

As with before, the band were quick to begin work on their third album. After working with Mike Hedges on their first two albums, the band hired Jon Kelly to produce the new album, a British producer famous for working with Pele, Prefab Sprout, Deacon Blue, Heather Nova, the Levellers, Fish, Lynsey De Paul, Nolwenn Leroy, the Damned, Kate Bush, The band decamped to AIR Studios in London to record the new album, the official recording studios of Associated Independent Recording. This credit has caused confusion, as the studio closed in 1989 before officially reopening as "AIR Lyndhurst" in a redeveloped hall in December 1992 after a year of construction and remodeling. It is unknown which of the two locations the band recorded in.

== Music and lyrics ==
=== Styles and themes ===
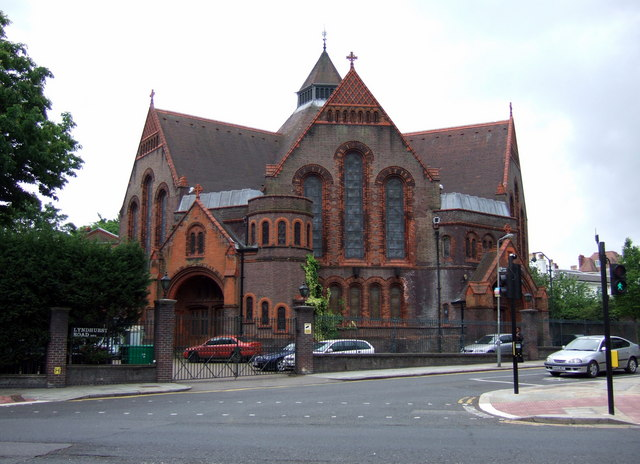
The album was recorded at AIR Studios in London (pictured in 2007).

According to Roch Pairisen of Allmusic, "there are no big poses or walls of crunchy guitars on [the album]. Instead, the group – which includes three lead vocalists – deals in fragile melodies and harmonies, soulful but low-key instrumentation, and lyrics full of subtle social commentary and humour." He noted that "at times, the group even couches itself in the guise of a smooth lounge act, rebelling against current trends by having something to say while not making a racket about it," and noted that producer Jon Kelly has "contributed an incisive and full-bodied production" to the album, "a great improvement over the rather thin sound" of Choke. According to Craig Tomashoff and David Hiltbrand of Picks and Pans, the album contains "sweet pop music with insidious lyrics. It starts with the best pop melodies you can hum—sort of like Elton John Does Detroit. Harmonious piano arrangements blend with songwriter Paul Heaton's soulful vocals and occasional backing horns to create 12 songs that work like aural lithium." They noted the contrast between the happy music and dark lyrics, saying "one hit and you're happy for hours. Until you actually listen to what Heaton and his two co-lead vocalists, Dave Hemingway and Briana Corrigan, are saying. The tunes suggest light, happy odes to love. The words are dark, sardonic musings on human nature."

According to Trouser Press, the album "features even more uplifting melodies and more balanced lyrics: 'Old Red Eyes Is Back', 'We Are Each Other' and the Corrigan-sung 'Bell-Bottomed Tear' benefit immeasurably by demonstrating a bit more compassion for their subjects. Heaton hits particular peaks in his dialogue songs. (He writes alternating-verse male/female numbers better than just about anyone.)" Marie Lamie, writing in The Rough Guide to Rock, said "there are some very sombre moments here, both musically and lyrically, making something of a new direction." A reviewer for Record Rewind Play said "the whole album is full of hints of the sinister, but compassion finds a way in."

=== Songs ===
Ted Kessler of Select said the first two songs "Old Red Eyes Is Back" and "We are Each Other" "set the tone" for the album. "Pianos, strings and percussion are right down in the mix, the lead instruments are the gorgeous voices of Heaton, Hemingway and Briana Corrigan. There isn't a wailing guitar in sight". "Old Red Eyes Is Back", described as the band's "best song ever" by Sputnikmusic's Nick Butler, is the tale of an "old drunken waster looking back on his life, battling to overcome his alcohol dependancy [sic]. Every time he falls off the wagon and succumbs to drink again....well, old red eyes is back." The song ends sadly, "Old Red he died, and every single landlord in the district cried/An empty bottle of whiskey lying by his side..." "We Are Each Other" is "typical of the band from this period. Although a guitar is the first sound you hear on the song, it's restrained, and quickly gives way to the melody, harmony, and biting vocals that drive the song." It is more guitar-led than most of their output, and deals with "a couple so close that their relationship can no longer function properly." Butler commented that "the structure of the song is brilliant (this sort of attention to detail is just one of the many things that elevate The Beautiful South far beyond the vast majority of pop bands) – observe how the chorus is split into 2 halves, effectively making 2 brilliant hooks for the price of one." Robert Christgau considers the song to contain Heaton's "meanest" line, "Closer than a sister to her baby brother/Closer than a cat to the child that she'll smother."

"Despite being one of England's most successful bands, it wasn't until 0898, their third album, that the Beautiful South found an audience in the US. This success (though by no means huge) might be explained by the fact that the band adopted a slightly more muscular sound on the album. Where in the past they had used deceptively sweet, even sentimental, musical backing, here there are slashing guitars and gruesomely bubbling bass lines to toughen the sound. Fans can rest easy, though, the band's unbelievable cruel and bitter lyrics remain in full force."

— A journalist referring to the album.

"36D" is a scathing attack on the British glamour industry, described by Nick Butler of Sputnikmusic as "a distant relative of 'Little Baby Nothing' by the Manic Street Preachers, though far more upbeat than that song," "features Heaton addressing a woman who's got by on looks and sex alone, telling her to 'Close your legs, open your mind' (and that's just the opening line!). The chorus packs a sonic punch you wouldn't expect from the band, as Heaton and Hemmingway ask '36D, so what? Is that all that you got?'." "Something that You Said" refers to the serial murders of a lover's family ("So if you walk into your house and she's cutting up your mother/ She's only trying to tell you that she loves you like no other"). Kessler said that "Hemingway and Corrigan provide us with an action replay of 'A Little Time'" on the song, but "this is Paul Heaton's show, and he doesn't let anyone steal it." The song's opening line, "The perfect love song it has no words it only has death threats/and you can tell a classic ballad by how threatening it gets," contrasts the "peaceful" music.

Vocal duties on "Bell Bottomed Tear" are handled mainly by Briana Corrigan, though Heaton does appear at points. It has been noted that "the strengths of her voice is exploited very well here – sugary, with a slight hiccup, but always fragile and vaguely damaged." One reviewer said "her character here is never made explicitly clear – she's adressing [sic] a man who has got her pregnant, though whether she and the man are still together isn't made clear. Either way, he's ruined her life. Quietly devastating." "Here it is Again" is a "brooding" song, whilst "You Play Glockenspiel, I'll Play Drums" is "odd". Closing song "When I'm 84" encapsulates the album's "dizzily wayward feel" and is a song of "innante funkiness," "blessed with a groovy electronic piano and a bassline worth suing for. It contains Heaton's hedonistic and bold plans for retirement. 'Exercise your muscles?', he spits. 'I'd rather jack.'"

== Release ==
0898 Beautiful South was released on 30 March 1992 on CD, LP and cassette by the band's label Go! Discs in the United Kingdom, whilst it was released on 4 May in Australia. The album cover, which depicts ladies' faces on the back of terrapins' shells, each representing a different mood on the album, was painted by artist David Cutter, as are the numerous illustrations in the liner notes, each of which is based on a song from the album, with one illustration for each song. The illustrations for the album's four singles also appeared as the covers for those singles. The full title of the album is 0898 Beautiful South, but it is usually shortened to just 0898, which is how it appears on the back cover of the album. The spacing and typography difference on the front cover and spine can be taken to imply it should be read as "0898" (by) "Beautiful South" – two separate phrases, although the spine of the album features both the band name and the full title separately. The title refers to the 0898 premium rate telephone prefix associated with sex hotlines in the UK at the time.

Four singles were released from the album, two of them prior to its release. "Old Red Eyes Is Back" was released in December 1991 and reached number 22 on the UK Singles Chart. It reached number 51 on the German Media Control singles chart. "We are Each Other" was released on 2 March 1992, still prior to the release of the album, and was a lesser success in the UK, only reaching number 30. However, it provided the band with their biggest hit in the United States, where it peaked at number 10 on the Billboard Modern Rock Tracks chart. The single charted at number 81 on the German chart. "Bell Bottomed Tear" was released as the third single in June 1992, reaching number 16 on the UK Singles Chart, becoming the highest-charting single from the album. "36D" was released as the final single in September 1992, reaching number 46 in the UK. In an interview at the time of the album's release, Sean Welch only imagined three singles would have been released, saying "three should be enough, I think, for anybody to release off an album."

The album was not a success in the United States, although it gave the band a larger following there than before. Billboard magazine reported in July 1992 that "although it has not yet dented the Heatseekers chart," the album "was experiencing a sales burst" in the United States. They said it was due to the band's "well-attended" concerts in Los Angeles and New York City and their appearance on The Dennis Miller Show. In France, a limited edition contained two bonus tracks, "His Time Ran Out" and "Danielle Steele (The Enemy Within)". A limited edition box set version released in the UK included CD and cassette copies of the album alongside the band's VHS music video compilation The Pumpkin.

== Reception and legacy ==
=== Initial reception ===
Professional ratings
Review scores
Source	Rating
AllMusic	3/5 stars
Calgary Herald	C−
The Encyclopedia of Popular Music	3/5 stars
NME	8/10
Q	("Good")
Robert Christgau	A−
The New Rolling Stone Album Guide	3.5/5 stars
The Rough Guide to Rock	(favourable)
Select	5/5 stars

On 11 April 1992, 0898 Beautiful South entered in the UK Albums Chart at number four, which was considered something of a disappointment after the band's previous albums both reached number two. It stayed on the chart for 17 weeks, and was later certified "Gold" by the British Phonographic Industry (BPI) for sales of over 200,000 copies. The album peaked at number 47 on the Canadian Albums Chart, becoming their last album to chart there, whilst on 20 April 1992, it entered the German Album Charts at number 40, becoming their first album to chart there. It also peaked at number 72 on the Dutch Album Top 100 in late April/early May 1992, thus becoming their sole album to chart in the Netherlands.

The album was released to positive reviews. Ted Kessler of Select gave the album a perfect five out of five score, saying "under a veneer of polished pop production The Beautiful South are contrary, twisted mavericks, and 0898 is the bright, acceptable face of the foul beast AOR – and their best work to date". Robert Christgau rated the album "A−", saying "even more obscure stateside since he got lusher conventions, songsmith Paul Heaton does his endangered species proud. The tunes stick, and the lyrics transcend their sarcastic shtick—predictably idiosyncratic though 'You do English/I'll do sums/You break fingers/I'll break thumbs' may be, it brings you up short anyway. Peter Gabriel/Kate Bush hand Jon Kelly adds musical authenticity, and third vocalist Briana Corrigan sings lines like 'This is the woman you laid' with just the right edge of icy remorse. Introduce them to a decent drum programmer and they could be a threat."

Q gave the album a "Good" rating of three stars out of five, saying "The Beautiful South offers us boozers and losers, reshaping the world and overthrowing the government from the comfort of a bar stool." Audio were favourable, saying "The Beautiful South effortlessly renders their sophisticated pop melodies and signature lyricism with silken production...wickedly clever." People, in its Picks and Pans section, were favourable, saying "minor melodramas aren't exactly the variety of glib pleasantries you'd expect such easygoing music to be delivering, but the ability to use the standard pop format to sneak in something new is the sign of a truly exceptional band. It's well worth taking a trip to the Beautiful South."

The album appeared in numerous lists of the best albums of 1992. Vox included the album at number 18 on their list of the "Vox Albums of 1992", NME ranked it at number 44 in its list of the top 50 "Albums of the Year", Robert Christgau placed the album at number 53 on the 1992 edition of his annual "Dean's List" of the best albums of the year, curated for the annual Pazz & Jop critics' roll. A reviewer for The Pansentinent League included the album in his list of "My Ten Favourite Albums of the 1990s", saying it is "full of clever, funny, bittersweet lines and packed with memorable pop songs from start to finish."

=== Legacy ===
The album has enjoyed a similarly favourable legacy, and some consider it to be an under-rated record. In a retrospective review, Roch Parisien of AllMusic praised the band's unusual sound and Kelly's production. Colin Larkin rated the album three stars out of five in his book The Encyclopedia of Popular Music. In 1998, Christgau said the album was "stronger than reviews caviled". In 2003, Maria Lamie said that the album "has the privilege of still being liked by its creators". In The New Rolling Stone Album Guide, Keith Harris gave the album three and a half stars out of five. In 2014, a reviewer for Record Review Play said that "the whole album is full of hints of the sinister, as on 'Something That You Said', but compassion finds a way in (Old Red Eyes Is Back, 'I'm Your Number One Fan') to provide just enough of a break from the darkness, and while there's humour, it comes in both dark and lighter shades, as on 'When I'm 84'. Perhaps old age has pushed it to the back of the collection, or perhaps the unprecedented success of compilation album Carry on up the Charts, which sold record numbers in record time and seemed to find a home in music collections up and down the land, big or small, just led to Beautiful South fatigue. Regardless, 0898 is long overdue a revisit or two."

Corrigan chose to leave the band after the release of the album to pursue a solo career. Although her decision was partly prompted by a desire to record and promote her own material (which was not getting exposure within the Beautiful South), she had also had ethical disagreements over some of Heaton's lyrics, most notably "Mini-correct", "Worthless Lie", which he had composed for the following album Miaow (1994), but also for the 0898 Beautiful South single "36D", which criticised the British glamour industry via scathing comments about glamour models, and she thought he should have targeted the media instead. In 1997, Hemingway admitted "we all agree that we should have targeted the media as sexist instead of blaming the girls for taking off their tops".

The band followed 0898 Beautiful South with Miaow (1994) which was their least successful album so far, reaching only number 6 in the UK Albums Chart and receiving mixed reviews. However, the band's fortunes were revived with the release of their first greatest hits album Carry on up the Charts later that year, which became the band's first number one album in the UK and went on to become the second biggest selling album of 1994, and by the summer of 1995 it was certified as 5× platinum in the UK. Such was the album's popularity, it was claimed that one in seven British households owned a copy. The compilation featured the four singles from 0898 Beautiful South, bringing them wider exposure than they had in 1992. "Old Red Eyes Is Back" also featured on their second hits compilation, Solid Bronze – Great Hits (2001), whilst the same song appeared alongside "36D" on Soup (2007), a compilation of hits by both the Beautiful South and Heaton and Hemingway's previous band the Housemartins.

== Track listing ==
All tracks are written by Paul Heaton and David Rotheray.

No.	Title	Lead vocals	Length
1.	"Old Red Eyes Is Back"	Paul Heaton	3:35
2.	"We Are Each Other"	Heaton	3:39
3.	"The Rocking Chair"	Briana Corrigan	4:43
4.	"We'll Deal With You Later"	Heaton	4:07
5.	"Domino Man"	Heaton	2:40
6.	"36D"	Dave Hemingway, Heaton	5:16
7.	"Here It is Again"	Heaton, Hemingway	3:27
8.	"Something That You Said"	Hemingway, Corrigan	4:20
9.	"I'm Your No. 1 Fan"	Heaton, Hemingway, Corrigan	4:28
10.	"Bell Bottomed Tear"	Corrigan, Hemingway	4:35
11.	"You Play Glockenspiel, I'll Play Drums"	Heaton	5:06
12.	"When I'm 84"	Heaton	4:32

=== French Limited Edition ===
The first French edition distributed by Barclay contained two bonus tracks:

1. "His Time Ran Out"
2. "Danielle Steele (The Enemy Within)"

== Non-LP/CD B-Sides ==
As was their usual modus operandi, The Beautiful South included unreleased material on the B-sides of the singles taken from their albums.

from the "Old Red Eyes Is Back" 12" single and CDEP

- "Old Red Eyes Is Back"
- "Fleet St. B.C."
- "Diamonds" (M.G. Greaves)

from the "We Are Each Other" 12" single and CDEP

- "We Are Each Other"
- "His Time Ran Out"
- "I Started A Joke" (Barry, Robin & Maurice Gibb) (this is a longer version of 4:33 later edited to 3:57, using an earlier fade-out for the limited edition bonus disc of Carry on up the Charts)

from the "Bell Bottomed Tear" CD1

- "Bell Bottomed Tear" (single edit)
- "A Thousand Lies"
- "They Used To Wear Black"

from the "Bell Bottomed Tear" CD2

- "Bell Bottomed Tear" (album version)
- "Woman in the Wall"
- "You Should Be Dancing" (Barry, Robin & Maurice Gibb)

(Tracks 2 & 3 recorded live at St. Georges Hall, Blackburn, 25 April 1992)

(An Australian CDEP of "Bell Bottomed Tear" contained the album version and all four non-LP tracks noted above)

from the "36D" CD1

- "36D"
- "Throw His Song Away"
- "Trevor, You're Bizarre"

from the "36D" CD2

- "36D"
- "From Under The Covers"
- "You Keep It All In"
- "36D"

(Tracks 2, 3, & 4 recorded live at St. Georges Hall, Blackburn, 25 April 1992)

== Personnel ==
- Paul Heaton – Vocals
- David Rotheray – Guitar
- Dave Hemmingway – Vocals
- Sean Welch – Bass
- David Stead – Drums
- Briana Corrigan – Vocals

Production

- Jon Kelly – Producer, Mixing
- John Brough – Engineer
- Steve Orchard – Engineer
- Lance Phillips – Mixing
