= Cromore railway station =

Railway station in County Londonderry, Northern Ireland

Coordinates: 55.17817°N 6.687758°W

Cromore Portstewart
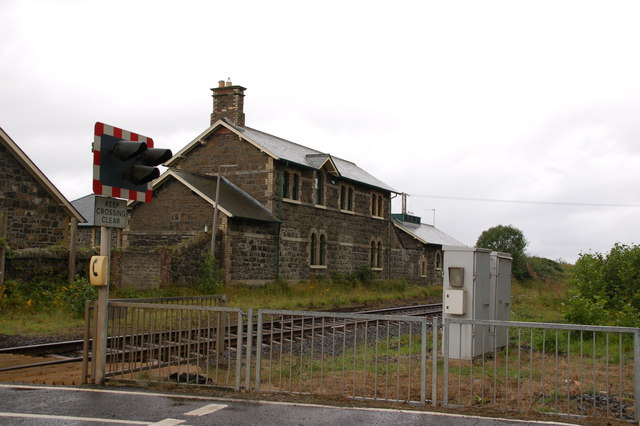
- The station building on 15 August 2006 having lost some of its original features including the platform and some chimneys. There is a level crossing here.

General information
- Location: Station Road; Portstewart, County Londonderry; Northern Ireland
- Platforms: 1

Other information
- Status: Disused

History
- Original company: Ballymena, Ballymoney, Coleraine and Portrush Junction Railway
- Pre-grouping: Belfast and Northern Counties Railway
- Post-grouping: Northern Counties Committee

Key dates
- 1 January 1856: Station opens as Portstewart
- 9 September 1963: Station closes to passengers
- 10 March 1969: Station reopens as Cromore Halt
- 15 May 1988: Halt closes
Location
- Location within Northern Ireland

Cromore railway station (also known as Cromore Halt and Portstewart) served the seaside resort of Portstewart in County Londonderry, Northern Ireland.

== History ==
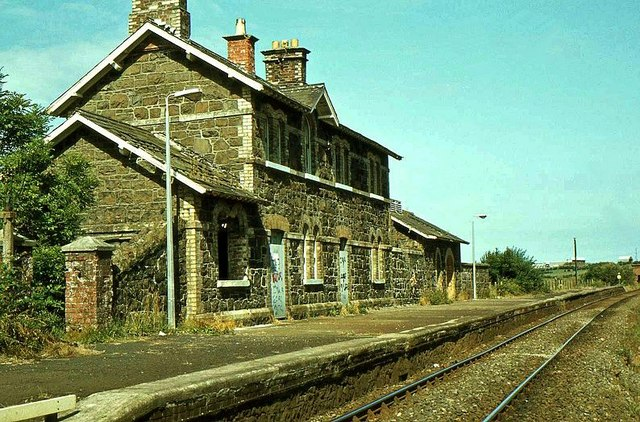
The station on 13 August 1983

The station was opened as Portstewart by the Ballymena, Ballymoney, Coleraine and Portrush Junction Railway in 1856.

From 1882 to 1926, the Portstewart Tramway provided a direct connection to the town of Portstewart and had its terminus at the station.

The station closed to passengers on 9 September 1963. It then re-opened as a request stop on 10 March 1969, named Cromore following the upgrade of the line and closed again on 15 May 1988.

== Services ==
Preceding station	NI Railways	Following station
University	Northern Ireland Railways; Coleraine-Portrush	Dhu Varren
	Historical railways	
Coleraine	Ballymena, Ballymoney, Coleraine and Portrush Junction Railway; Ballymena-Portrush	Portrush
