= Dunloy railway station =

Railway station in County Antrim, Northern Ireland

Dunloy
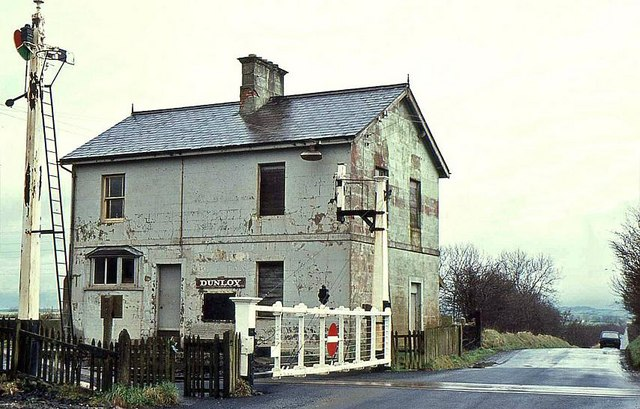
- The remains of Dunloy station photographed on 17 March 1982

General information
- Location: Dunloy, County Antrim; Northern Ireland
- Coordinates: 55.0153°N 6.4025°W

Other information
- Status: Disused

History
- Original company: Ballymena, Ballymoney, Coleraine and Portrush Junction Railway
- Pre-grouping: Belfast and Northern Counties Railway
- Post-grouping: Northern Ireland Railways

Key dates
- 1 July 1856: Station opens
- 17 October 1976: Station closes
Location

Dunloy railway station served the village of Dunloy in County Antrim, Northern Ireland.

== History ==
The station was opened by the Ballymena, Ballymoney, Coleraine and Portrush Junction Railway on 1 July 1856. It was taken over by the Northern Counties Committee in January 1861.

The signal box at Dunloy was destroyed in 1921 and again in 1957 during periods of civil disturbance.

The station closed to passengers on 17 October 1976. However, there have been calls to reopen the station at Dunloy.

Preceding station	NI Railways	Following station
Cullybackey	Northern Ireland Railways; Belfast-Derry	Ballymoney
	Historical railways	
Killagan; Line open, station closed	Ballymena, Ballymoney, Coleraine and Portrush Junction Railway; Ballymena-Portrush	Ballymoney; Line and station open
