= Ballymena railway station =

Railway station in Ballymena, Northern Ireland

Ballymena
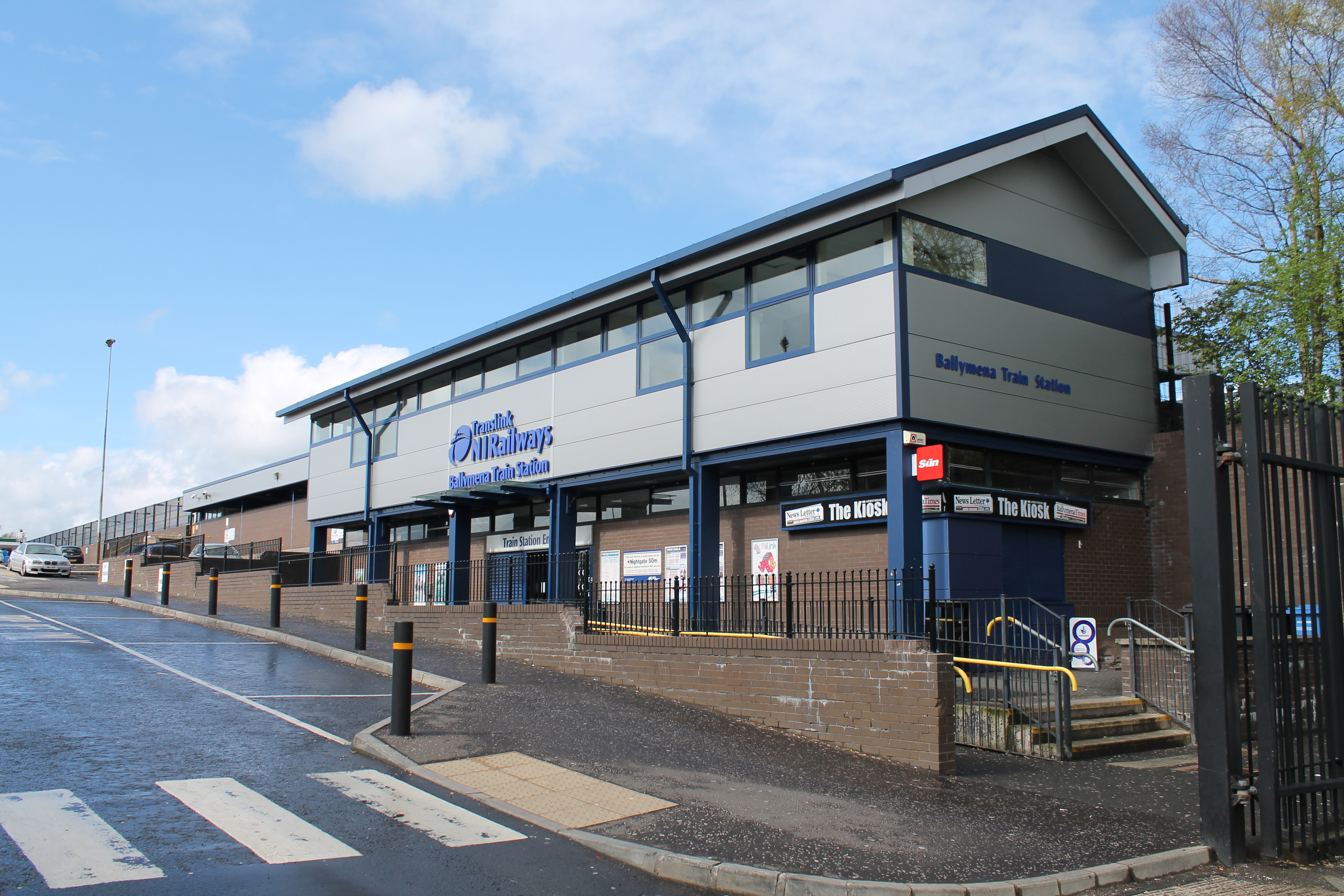

General information
- Location: Ballymena; Mid and East Antrim; Northern Ireland
- Coordinates: 54°51′51″N 6°17′5″W
- Owner: NI Railways
- Operator: NI Railways
- Line: Derry ~ Londonderry Line
- Platforms: 2
- Tracks: 2

Construction
- Structure type: At-grade

Other information
- Station code: BA

Key dates
- 11 April 1848: Original station opened
- 4 December 1855: Station relocated
- 1904: Rebuilt
- 1981: Current station opened
- 2008: Refurbished

Passengers
- 2022/23: 661,364
- 2023/24: ▲849,825
- 2024/25: ▲883,276
- 2025/26: ▲946,559

Services
Preceding station	NI Railways	Following station
Cullybackey towards Coleraine, Portrush or Derry~Londonderry	Derry ~ Londonderry Line	Antrim towards Belfast Grand Central

Historical railway lines
Preceding station	Belfast and Ballymena Railway	Following station
Terminus	Belfast and Ballymena Railway; York Road–Ballymena	Andraid; Line open, station closed
Preceding station	Ballymena, Ballymoney, Coleraine and Portrush Junction Railway	Following station
Cullybackey; Line and station open	Ballymena, Ballymoney, Coleraine and Portrush Junction Railway; Ballymena–Portrush	Terminus
Preceding station	Ballymena, Cushendall and Red Bay Railway	Following station
Terminus	Ballymena, Cushendall and Red Bay Railway; Ballymena–Retreat	Ballygarvey; Line and station closed
Preceding station	Ballymena and Larne Railway	Following station
Terminus	Ballymena and Larne Railway; Ballymena–Larne	Kells; Line and station closed
- NI Railways; Translink; NI railway stations
Route map
(Click to expand)
Location
- Location within Northern Ireland Location within island of Ireland
- Location in Ballymena
Notes
- Passenger statistics are Translink railway station footfall counts rather than accredited passenger-journey statistics.

Ballymena railway station serves the town of Ballymena in County Antrim, Northern Ireland. It is located just outside Ballymena town centre on the Galgorm Road, and is integrated with the local bus station. It is situated on the Derry line between Antrim and Cullybackey. The station is operated by Northern Ireland Railways.

== History ==
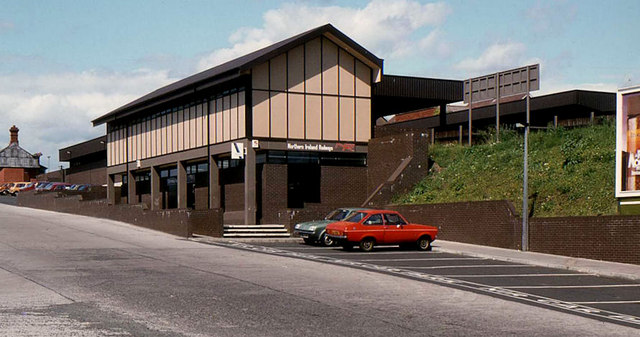
Ballymena 1982

The first station in Ballymena opened on 11 April 1848 by the Belfast and Ballymena Railway. This initial station was rebuilt and relocated on 4 December 1855 when the Ballymena, Ballymoney, Coleraine and Portrush Junction Railway extended the line northwards.

At one time, there were several other stations in the Ballymena area, however the only other one which survives to this day is Cullybackey.

In addition to mainline services between Belfast York Road and Coleraine, the station provided a terminus for two narrow gauge railways:

- Ballymena, Cushendall and Red Bay Railway - which opened in 1875 and closed in 1940
- Ballymena and Larne Railway - which opened in 1877 and closed in 1933

The station buildings were rebuilt in 1903-1904 to designs by Berkeley Deane Wise. The rebuilding cost in excess of £15,000 (equivalent to £1,576,908 in 2025). The clock was provided by Sharman D. Neill of Belfast, and iron water storage towers were constructed by Cowan Sheldon and Company of Carlisle. On 19 May 1921 the station suffered an arson attack by the Irish Republican Army.

The original station buildings were removed in 1981-1982 during a modernisation programme by Northern Ireland Railways.

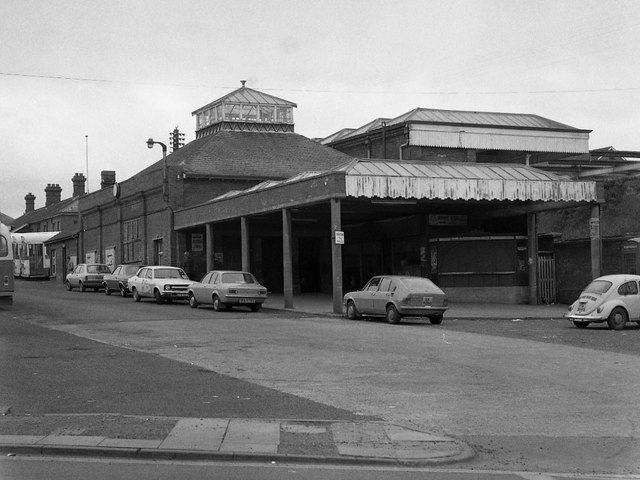
Station exterior

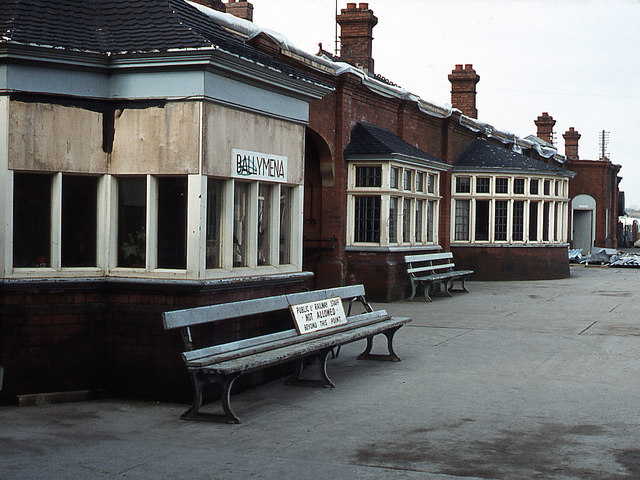
Platform 1 during rebuilding works

Ballymena station in 1980 prior to the 1981 modernisation

== Current services ==
Ballymena railway station consists of two platforms and serves as a passing point on the mainly single-track Belfast–Derry line.

On Mondays to Saturdays, there is an hourly service to Belfast Grand Central. In the other direction, there is an hourly service to Derry~Londonderry, with the last service terminating at Coleraine.

On Sundays services alternate between going to Derry~Londonderry or Portrush and the last service terminating at Coleraine. In the other direction there is an hourly service to Belfast Grand Central.

Future plans involve the reinstatement of the original double-track between Antrim and Ballymena.
