= Killagan railway station =

Railway station in County Antrim, Northern Ireland

Killagan
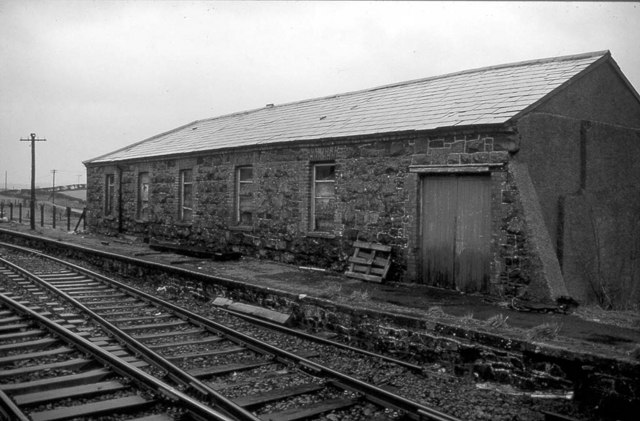
- Killagan Station as viewed on 3 January 1996, the main station building has been removed, but the goods shed which was attached to the station, is still in use as a farmers storage shed.

General information
- Location: County Antrim; Northern Ireland
- Coordinates: 54.9841°N 6.3685°W

Other information
- Status: Disused

History
- Original company: Ballymena, Ballymoney, Coleraine and Portrush Junction Railway
- Pre-grouping: Belfast and Northern Counties Railway
- Post-grouping: Northern Ireland Railways

Key dates
- 4 December 1855: Station opens as Bellaghy
- 1 January 1876: Station renamed Killagan
- 2 July 1973: Station closes
Location

Killagan railway station served the villages of Bellaghy and Killagan in County Antrim, Northern Ireland.

== History ==
The station was opened as Bellaghy by the Ballymena, Ballymoney, Coleraine and Portrush Junction Railway on 4 December 1855. It was taken over by the Northern Counties Committee in January 1861.

It was renamed Killagan on 1 January 1876.

The signal box at Killagan was destroyed in 1921 and again in 1957 during periods of civil disturbance.

The station closed to passengers on 2 July 1973.

Preceding station	NI Railways	Following station
Glarryford	Northern Ireland Railways; Belfast-Derry	Dunloy
	Historical railways	
Glarryford; Line open, station closed	Ballymena, Ballymoney, Coleraine and Portrush Junction Railway; Ballymena-Portrush	Dunloy; Line open, station closed
