= Ballymoney railway station =

Railway station in Ballymoney, Northern Ireland

Ballymoney
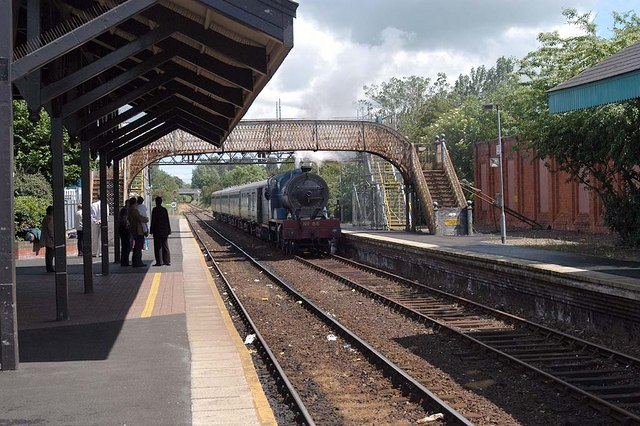
- Ballymoney railway station in 2004

General information
- Location: Seymour Street; Ballymoney; BT53 6JR; Causeway Coast and Glens; Northern Ireland
- Coordinates: 55°4′0″N 6°30′50″W
- Owner: NI Railways
- Operator: NI Railways
- Line: Derry ~ Londonderry Line
- Platforms: 2
- Tracks: 2

Construction
- Structure type: At-grade
- Parking: Yes (104 spaces, including 6 accessible spaces)
- Cycle facilities: Yes (12 cycle racks)
- Accessible: Partial (level access to platform 1; platform 2 accessible via footbridge only)

Other information
- Status: Open
- Station code: BY
- Fare zone: iLink Zone 3
- Website: translink.co.uk/Ballymoney

Key dates
- 4 December 1855: Opened
- 1901–1902: Rebuilt
- 18 October 1880: Ballycastle Railway opened
- 1950: Ballycastle Railway closed
- 1990: Refurbished
- 2008: Refurbished

Passengers
- 2022/23: 374,836
- 2023/24: ▲470,210
- 2024/25: ▲490,492
- 2025/26: ▲508,994

Services
Preceding station	NI Railways	Following station
Coleraine towards Coleraine, Portrush or Derry~Londonderry	Derry ~ Londonderry Line	Cullybackey towards Belfast Grand Central

Historical railway lines
Preceding station	Ballycastle Railway	Following station
Dervock; Line and station closed	Ballycastle Railway; Ballymoney–Ballycastle	Terminus
Preceding station	Ballymena, Ballymoney, Coleraine and Portrush Junction Railway	Following station
Macfin; Line open, station closed	Ballymena, Ballymoney, Coleraine and Portrush Junction Railway; Ballymena–Portrush	Dunloy; Line open, station closed
- NI Railways; Translink; NI railway stations
Route map
(Click to expand)
Location
- Location within Northern Ireland Location within island of Ireland
- Location in Ballymoney
Notes
- Passenger statistics are Translink railway station footfall counts rather than accredited passenger-journey statistics.

Ballymoney railway station serves the town of Ballymoney in County Antrim, Northern Ireland.

== History ==
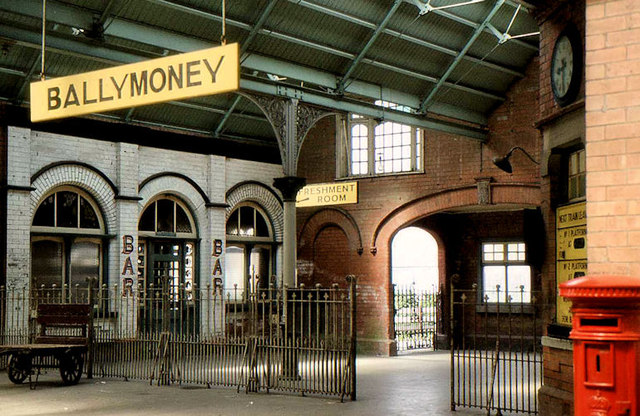
Station interior

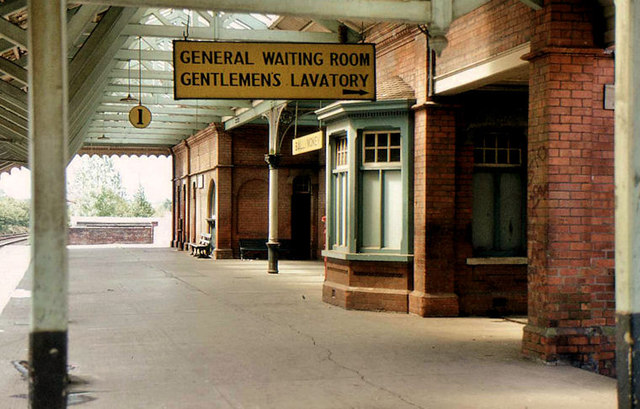
Platform 1

Ballymoney Station on 2 July 1983

Ballymoney station was opened by the Ballymena, Ballymoney, Coleraine and Portrush Junction Railway on 4 December 1855.

The station was rebuilt between 1901 and 1902 to designs by Berkeley Deane Wise in a Cottage style. The cast ironwork forming the station canopy was provided by MacFarlane's Saracen Foundry of Glasgow, and the cast iron footbridge was provided by the Sun Foundry of George Smith and Company in Glasgow.

Goods traffic was ceased on Monday 4 January 1965.

The station was also the southern terminus of the narrow gauge Ballycastle Railway, which closed in 1950.

== Service ==
On Mondays to Saturdays, there is an hourly service to Belfast Grand Central and an hourly service to Derry~Londonderry. The last train of the day terminates at Coleraine

On Sundays an hourly service operates to Belfast Grand Central. In the other direction all services are alternate every hour between Derry~Londonderry and Portrush except for the last outbound train of the evening, which terminates at Coleraine.
