= Cullybackey railway station =

Railway station in County Antrim, Northern Ireland

Cullybackey
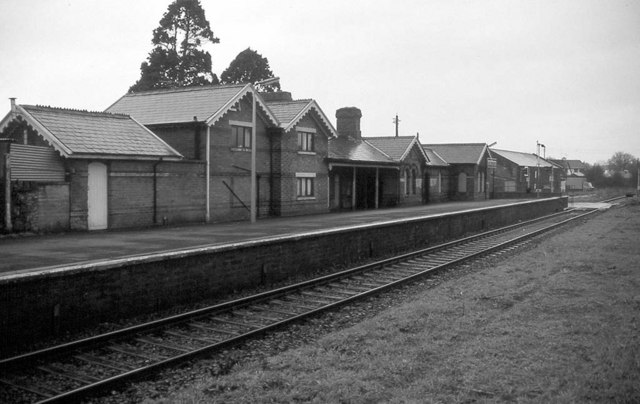
- Cullybackey railway station in 1996

General information
- Location: Cullybackey; Northern Ireland
- Coordinates: 54°53′17″N 6°20′41″W
- Owner: NI Railways
- Operator: NI Railways
- Line: Derry ~ Londonderry Line
- Platforms: 1
- Tracks: 1

Construction
- Structure type: At-grade

Other information
- Station code: CY
- Fare zone: iLink Zone 3
- Website: translink.co.uk/cullybackey

Key dates
- 1 July 1856: Opened
- September 1856: Closed
- 1 March 1865: Reopened
- 18 October 1976: Closed
- 28 June 1982: Reopened
- 2008: Refurbished

Passengers
- 2022/23: 153,018
- 2023/24: ▲207,558
- 2024/25: ▲214,861
- 2025/26: ▲240,525

Services
| Preceding station | NI Railways | Following station |
|---|---|---|
| Ballymoney towards Coleraine, Portrush or Derry~Londonderry | Derry ~ Londonderry Line | Ballymena towards Belfast Grand Central |

Historical railway lines
| Preceding station | Ballymena, Ballymoney, Coleraine and Portrush Junction Railway | Following station |
|---|---|---|
| Glarryford; Line open, station closed | Ballymena, Ballymoney, Coleraine and Portrush Junction Railway; Ballymena–Portrush | Ballymena; Line and station open |
- NI Railways; Translink; NI railway stations
Route map
(Click to expand)
Location
- Location within Northern Ireland Location within island of Ireland

Cullybackey railway station serves the village of Cullybackey in County Antrim, Northern Ireland.

== History ==
The station was opened by the Ballymena, Ballymoney, Coleraine and Portrush Junction Railway on 1 July 1856. It then closed in September 1856, and was re-opened on 1 March 1865.

There was a further closure on 18 October 1976, and it re-opened again on 28 June 1982.

This station was temporarily closed while a major track relaying programme was in operation between March and the end of June 2009. It reopened on 29 June 2009.

The listed station building is currently a cafe called “The Ticket bake house” after extensive renovation work, It opened 2023 and seems to be in the process of being linked to the platform. before 2020 it was fenced off, bricked/boarded up and derelict. It has been replaced with a small 'bus shelter' type structure on the platform.

== Incidents and accidents ==
On Friday, 24 March 2000, a woman died after a collision involving a passenger train and her car at a level crossing at Station Road, Cullybackey. None of the 88 passengers on board the train travelling from Belfast to Derry were hurt. The platform at Cullybackey was lengthened to accommodate the longer trains in the evening, coming from Belfast.

== Service ==
On Mondays to Saturdays, there is an hourly service to Belfast Grand Central. In the other direction there is an hourly service Derry~Londonderry, with the last service terminating at Coleraine

On Sundays services alternate between Derry~Londonderry or Portrush and the last service terminating at Coleraine in the other direction there is an hourly service to Belfast Grand Central.
