= Glarryford railway station =

Railway station in County Antrim, Northern Ireland

Glarryford
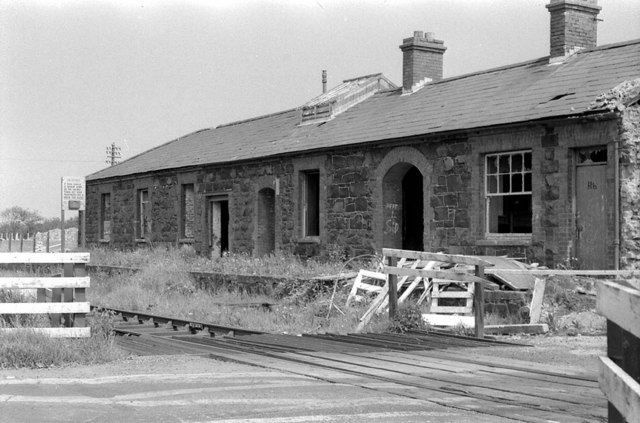
- Glarryford station photographed on 10 June 1979

General information
- Location: County Antrim; Northern Ireland
- Coordinates: 54.9534°N 6.3543°W

Other information
- Status: Disused

History
- Original company: Ballymena, Ballymoney, Coleraine and Portrush Junction Railway
- Pre-grouping: Belfast and Northern Counties Railway
- Post-grouping: Northern Ireland Railways

Key dates
- 1 July 1856: Station opens
- 2 July 1973: Station closes
Location

Glarryford railway station served the hamlet of Glarryford in County Antrim, Northern Ireland.

== History ==
The station was opened by the Ballymena, Ballymoney, Coleraine and Portrush Junction Railway on 1 July 1856. It was taken over by the Belfast and Northern Counties Railway in January 1861.

The station closed to passengers on 2 July 1973.

Preceding station	NI Railways	Following station
Cullybackey	Northern Ireland Railways; Belfast-Derry	Killagan
	Historical railways	
Cullybackey; Line and station open	Ballymena, Ballymoney, Coleraine and Portrush Junction Railway; Ballymena-Portrush	Killagan; Line open, station closed
