= Dominican College, Portstewart =

Coordinates: 55.182°N 6.721°W

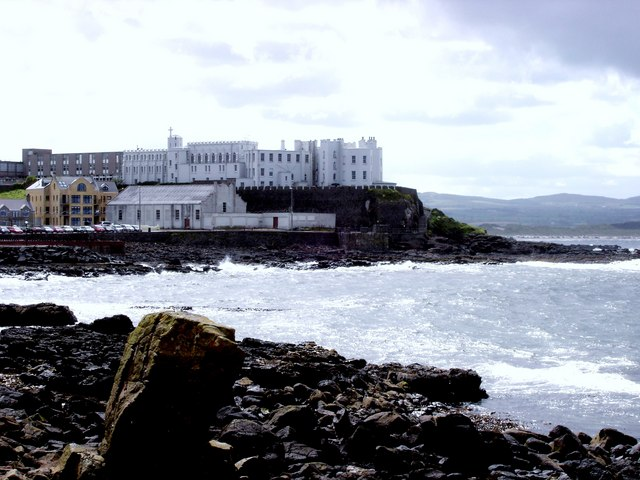

Location
- 2 Strand Road; Portstewart, BT55 7PF; Northern Ireland

Information
- Religious affiliation: Catholic
- Established: 1917
- Local authority: Education Authority (North Eastern)
- Principal: Ruth Oliver
- Gender: Girls and Boys
- Age: 11 to 18
- Colour
- Website: https://dominicanportstewart.com/

Dominican College Portstewart is a grammar school in Portstewart, County Londonderry, Northern Ireland. It is situated on a cliff overlooking the Atlantic Ocean with views over Portstewart's promenade, the northern coastline of Northern Ireland and the County Donegal hills in the Republic of Ireland.

== History ==
Rock Castle was originally built by Henry O'Hara in 1834. The castle was extended in 1844 and then passed to the Crombie family before being sold to the Dominican Sisters in 1917. The Dominican College "is concerned not merely with imparting knowledge and skills, which have their place, but, more importantly with training pupils to think, to evaluate and to make decisions."

== Academics ==
In 2018, 93.8% of its entrants achieved five or more GCSEs at grades A* to C, including the core subjects English and Maths. Also in 2018, 57.4% of its entrants to the A-level exam achieved A*-C grades.

== Notable former pupils ==
- Cathal Smyth / Chas Smash (born 1959) - Musician, Singer-Songwriter in Madness
- Briana Corrigan (born 1965) - First singer of The Beautiful South.
- Jimeoin McKeown (born 1966) - Comedian
- Helen O'Hara - Film critic, journalist and author
- Tony Wright (born 1981) - Musician, Singer Songwriter known as VerseChorusVerse, original member of And So I Watch You From Afar, actor and author

== See also ==
- Dominicans in Ireland
