= Portstewart Town Hall =

Municipal Building in Portstewart, Northern Ireland

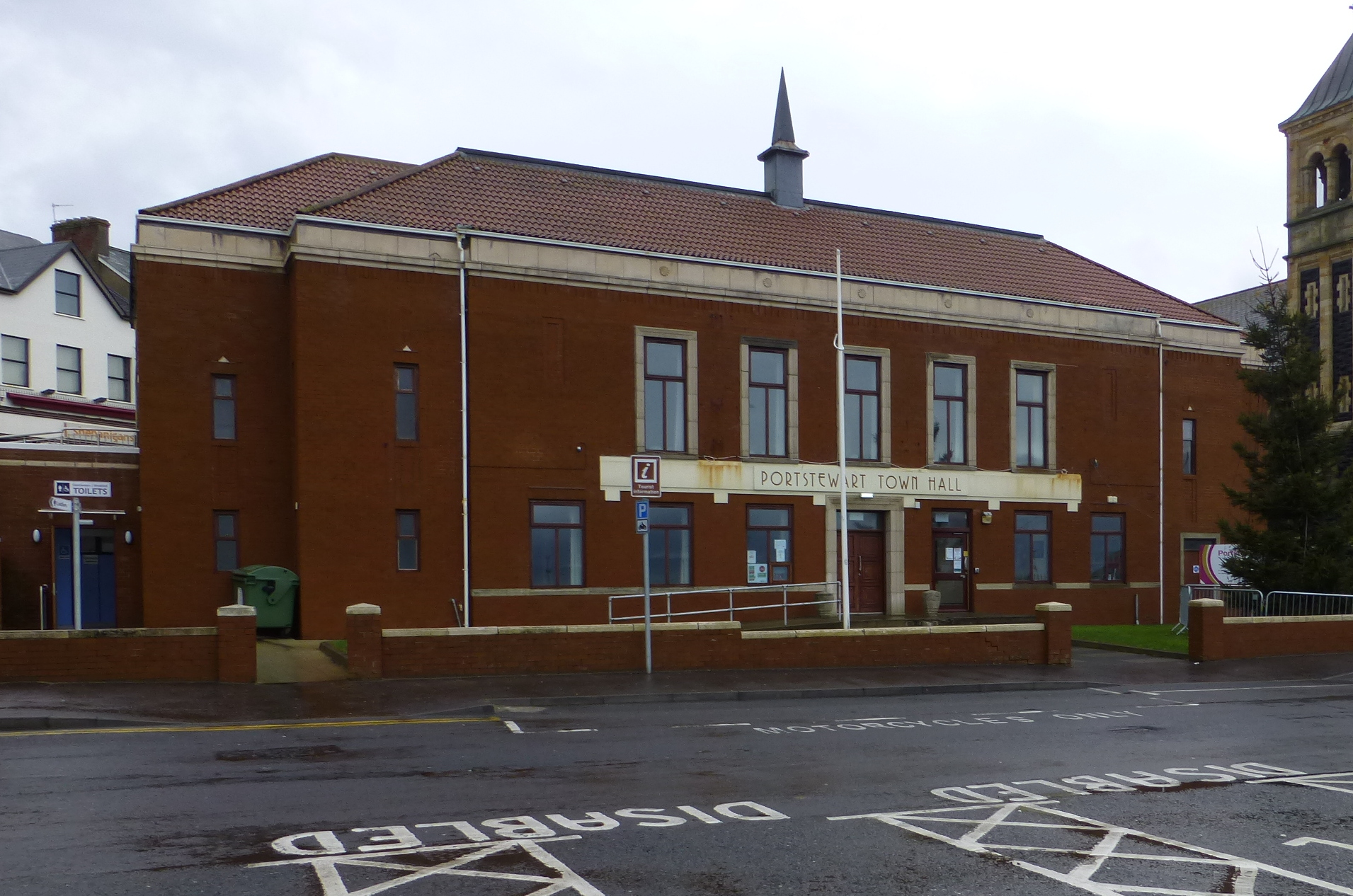
- Portstewart Town Hall

- Shown in Northern Ireland
- 55.1832°N 6.7188°W
- Location: The Crescent, Portstewart

History
- Built: 1934

Site notes
- Architect: Benjamin Cowser
- Architectural style: Modernist style

Listed Building – Grade B2
- Official name: Town Hall, The Crescent, Portstewart, County Londonderry
- Designated: 3 April 1992
- Reference no.: HB 03/08/007

Portstewart Town Hall is a municipal structure in The Crescent, Portstewart, County Londonderry, Northern Ireland. The structure, which has been closed to the public since December 2019, is a Grade B2 listed building.

== History ==
Following significant population growth, largely associated with the seaside tourism industry, the area became an urban district in 1916. In the late 1920s, council leaders decided to commission a permanent meeting place for the new council: the estate of the former principal landowner in the area, Commander Robert Acheson Cromie Montagu of Cromore House, made the selected site available to the council on a long lease for which they paid a premium of £1,000 in 1933.

The new building was designed by Benjamin Cowser in the modernist style, built by F. B. McKee & Co. of Belfast in red brick with concrete dressings at a cost of £8,000, and was officially opened by Lady Craigavon on 30 May 1935. The design involved a symmetrical main frontage with eleven bays facing onto The Crescent. The central section of seven bays, which slightly projected forward, featured a central doorway with a concrete architrave flanked by three casement windows on either side. On the first floor, there were five casement windows and a wide cast iron balcony, flanked by single blind panels on either side. The bays immediately beyond the central section and the outer bays, the latter of which were significantly recessed, were fenestrated with lancet windows. At roof level, there was a concrete entablature, a hip roof and a central turret. Internally, the principal rooms were the council chamber on the ground floor, and the concert hall on the first floor, which had a capacity for 380 people.

The building continued to serve as the meeting place of the urban district council for much of the 20th century, but ceased to be the local seat of government after the enlarged Coleraine Borough Council was formed in 1973. It was refurbished in 1973 and the cast iron balcony on the front of the building was replaced by a large concrete frieze inscribed with the words "Portstewart Town Hall" in 2000. As well as accommodating the local public library, the building became home to the Big Telly Theatre Company and went on to become a popular community events venue, although the Big Telly Theatre Company relocated to the Roe Valley Arts & Cultural Centre in 2015.

In 2019, after a structural survey revealed that the building was unsafe, the unitary authority, Causeway Coast and Glens Council, refused approval for the repair expenditure. The Montagu estate decided that successive councils had failed to maintain the building, and, after the estate had served an eviction notice on the council, the building was closed in November 2019. Following a two-year period of absence, the public library re-opened in new premises at Station Road in January 2022.
