= Portstewart Strand =

Beach in Northern Ireland

Coordinates: 55.168°N 6.745°W

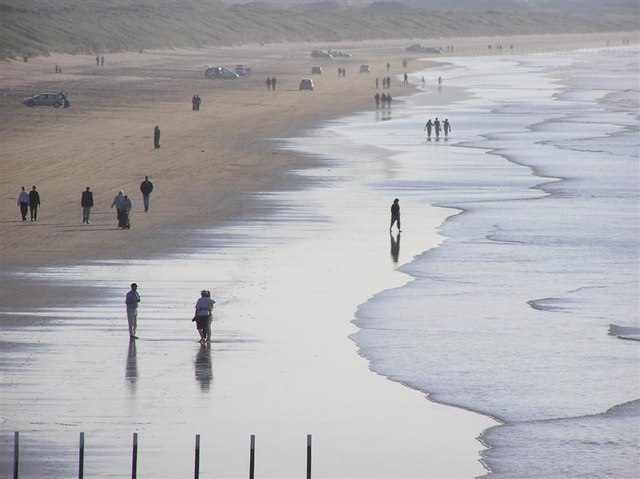
Portstewart Strand in 2005

Portstewart Strand is a sandy, two-mile long beach in Portstewart, County Londonderry, Northern Ireland, on the northern Atlantic Ocean coast of the island of Ireland. It is situated between the popular seaside resort of Portstewart and the mouth of the River Bann, known as the Barmouth and is one of the top 10 visitor attractions in Northern Ireland.

== Facilities ==
It is owned and managed by the National Trust and is a Blue Flag beach in recognition of high standards of beach management and water quality. Cars can be brought onto the beach and parked on the strand. When the National Trust purchased the beach in 1980, it allowed this long-standing tradition to continue. The beach attracts up to 180,000 visitors every year. All activities including watersports, are zoned. On 28 April 2008, the National Trust opened a new visitor facility at the beach following a £450,000 investment, part-funded through the Northern Ireland Tourist Board.

== Conservation ==
In 2000, the dune system was included in the Bann Estuary Area of Special Scientific Interest, due to the rare and fragile habitats and wildlife that it supports. Many species of butterflies and orchids, including the bee orchid, have been recorded, and can be viewed from waymarked trails.

== In popular culture ==
Portstewart Strand features as the Dornish Coast in Season Five of Game of Thrones, which sees Jaime Lannister and Bronn fight with Dornish guards.
