= Portstewart Tramway =

Tram system in Portstewart, Northern Ireland

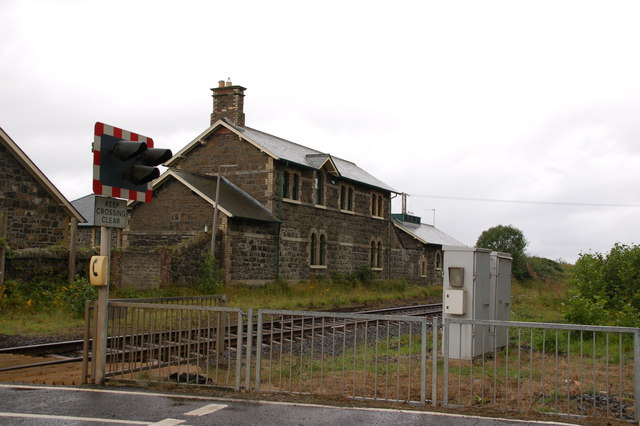
- Portstewart railway station

Operation
- Locale: Portstewart
- Open: 28 June 1882
- Close: 30 January 1926
- Status: Closed

Infrastructure
- Track gauge: 3 ft (914 mm)
- Propulsion system: Steam

Statistics
- Route length: 1.85 miles (2.98 km)

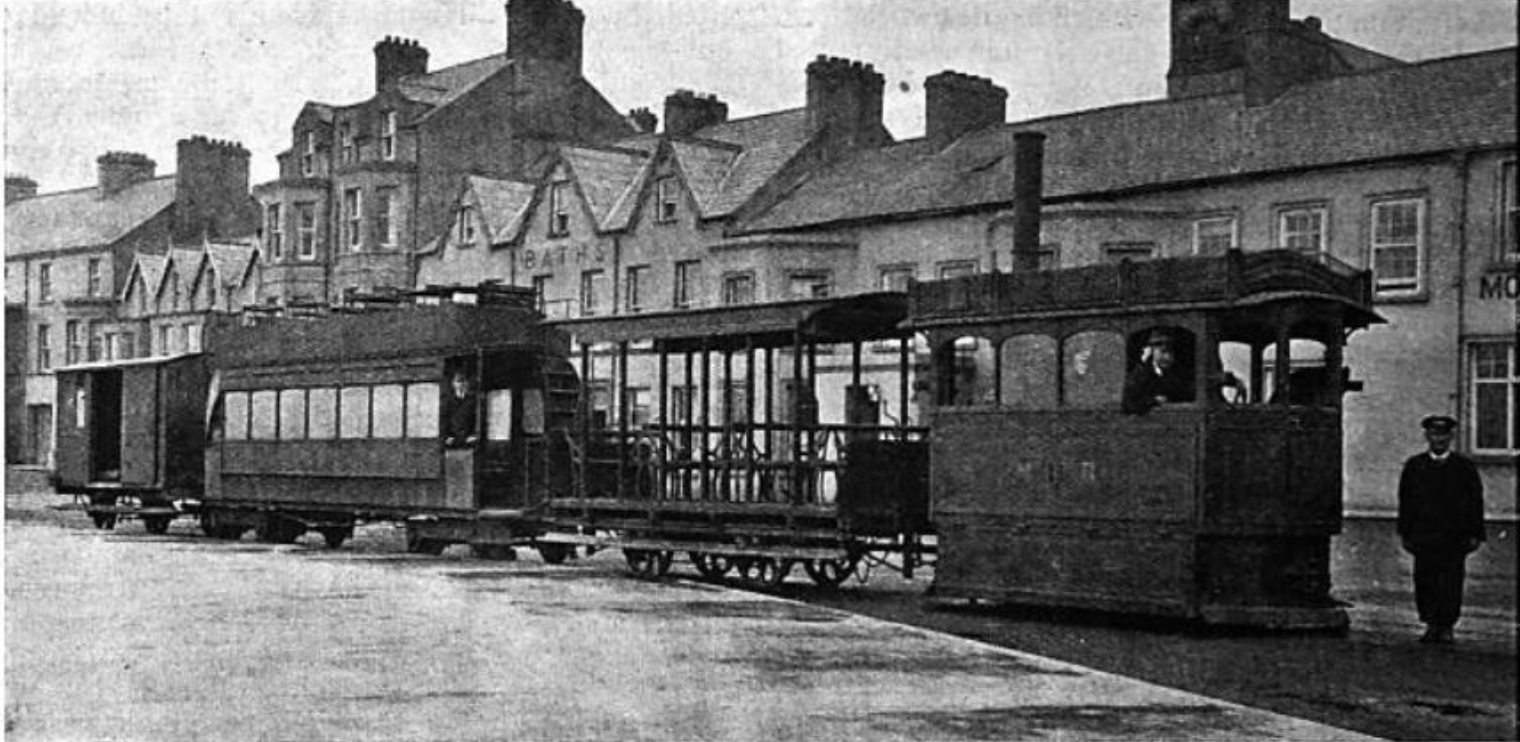
Locomotive No. 3 and train in 1927

The 3 ft (914 mm) narrow gauge Portstewart Tramway operated tramway services between Portstewart and Portstewart railway station at Cromore from 1882 to 1926.

== History ==
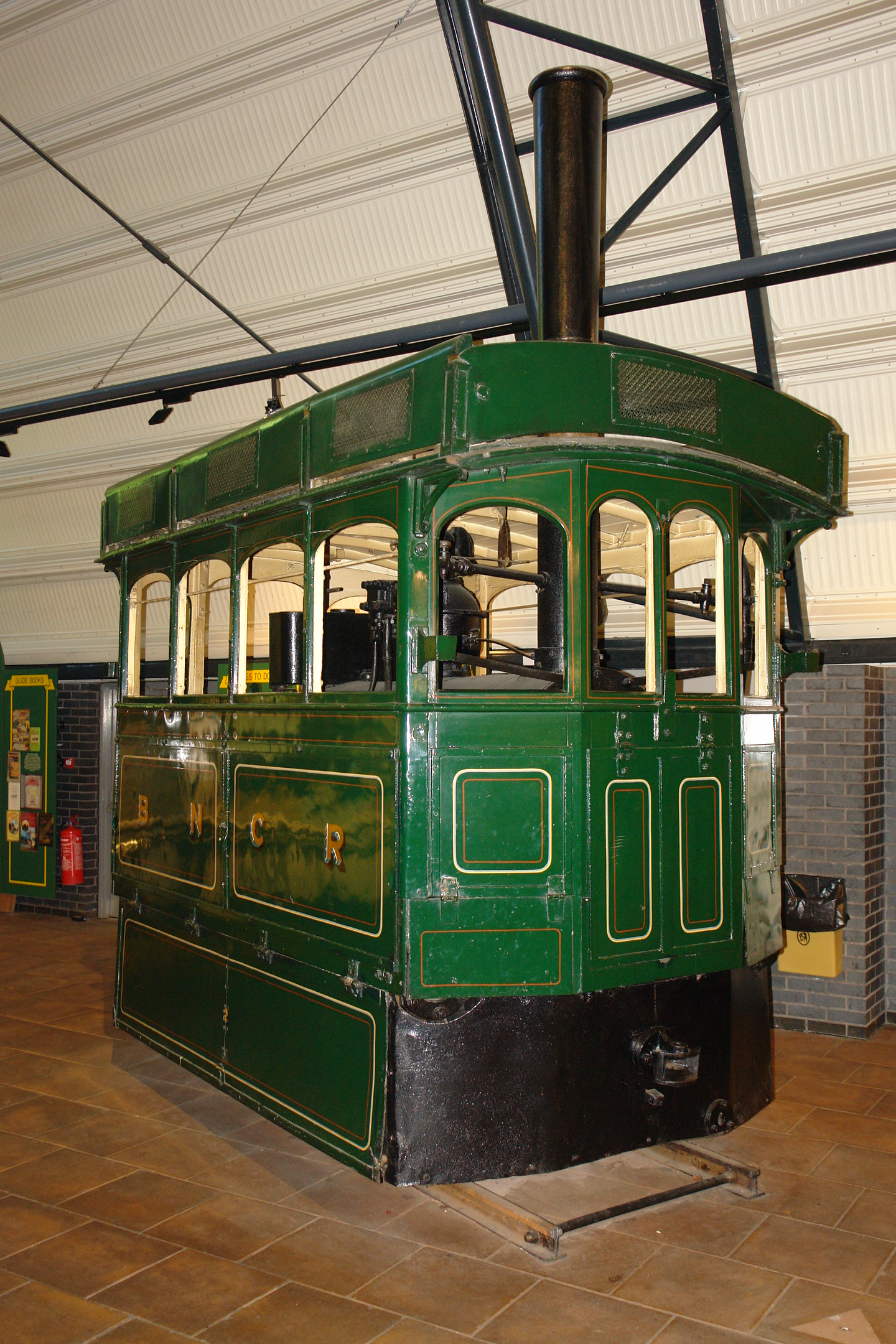
Steam tram engine No. 2

The Portstewart Tramway Company, formed by a group of local businessmen, built the Portstewart Tramway in 1882 to link Portstewart to Portstewart railway station on the Belfast and Northern Counties Railway Coleraine–Portrush railway line.

Services started around 21 June 1882, a few days in advance of the arrival of the formal permission from the Board of Trade on 28 June 1882. Two tram engines were obtained from Kitson and Company.

The tramway went into liquidation in 1897 and was purchased for £2,100 (equivalent to £236,000 in 2025) by the Belfast and Northern Counties Railway. They invested in the tramway providing some additional passenger vehicles and a new steam tramway engine. A new depot was constructed in Portstewart by the railway engineer Berkeley Deane Wise in 1899, at the southern end of the promenade, opposite the Town Hall.

It became part of the Midland Railway in 1903, and the London, Midland and Scottish Railway in 1923.

== Closure ==
The service ceased on 30 January 1926. A replacement bus service was provided by the London, Midland and Scottish Railway

== Preserved locomotives ==
- Tram engine 1 is preserved at the Streetlife Museum of Transport Hull
- Tram engine 2 is in the Ulster Folk and Transport Museum
