= Coleraine–Portrush line =

Branch railway line in Northern Ireland

Portrush Branch Line

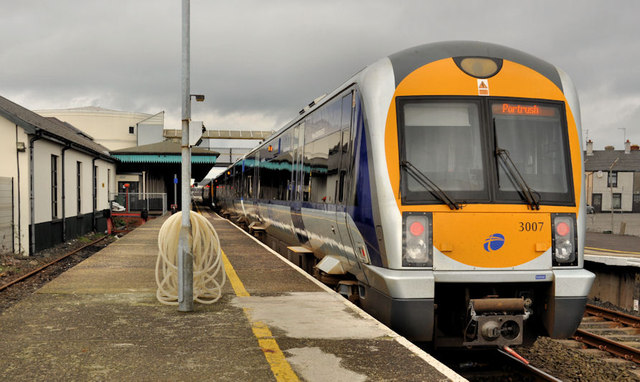
- Portrush line train about to leave Coleraine station 2012

Overview
- Status: Operational
- Locale: Northern Ireland
- Termini: Coleraine; Portrush
- Continues from: Belfast-Derry line
- Connecting lines: Belfast-Derry line
- Stations: 4

Service
- Type: Regional rail Heavy rail
- System: NI Railways
- Services: Belfast Grand Central-Portrush; Coleraine-Portrush
- Route number: NIR Service 3
- Operator(s): NI Railways
- Rolling stock: Class 3000 "C3K"; Class 4000 "C4K"

History
- Opened: 1855

Technical
- Number of tracks: Single track
- Character: Branch line
- Track gauge: 1,600 mm (5 ft 3 in) Irish gauge
- Electrification: no
- Operating speed: 70 mph (110 km/h)
- Signalling: Semaphore
Route map
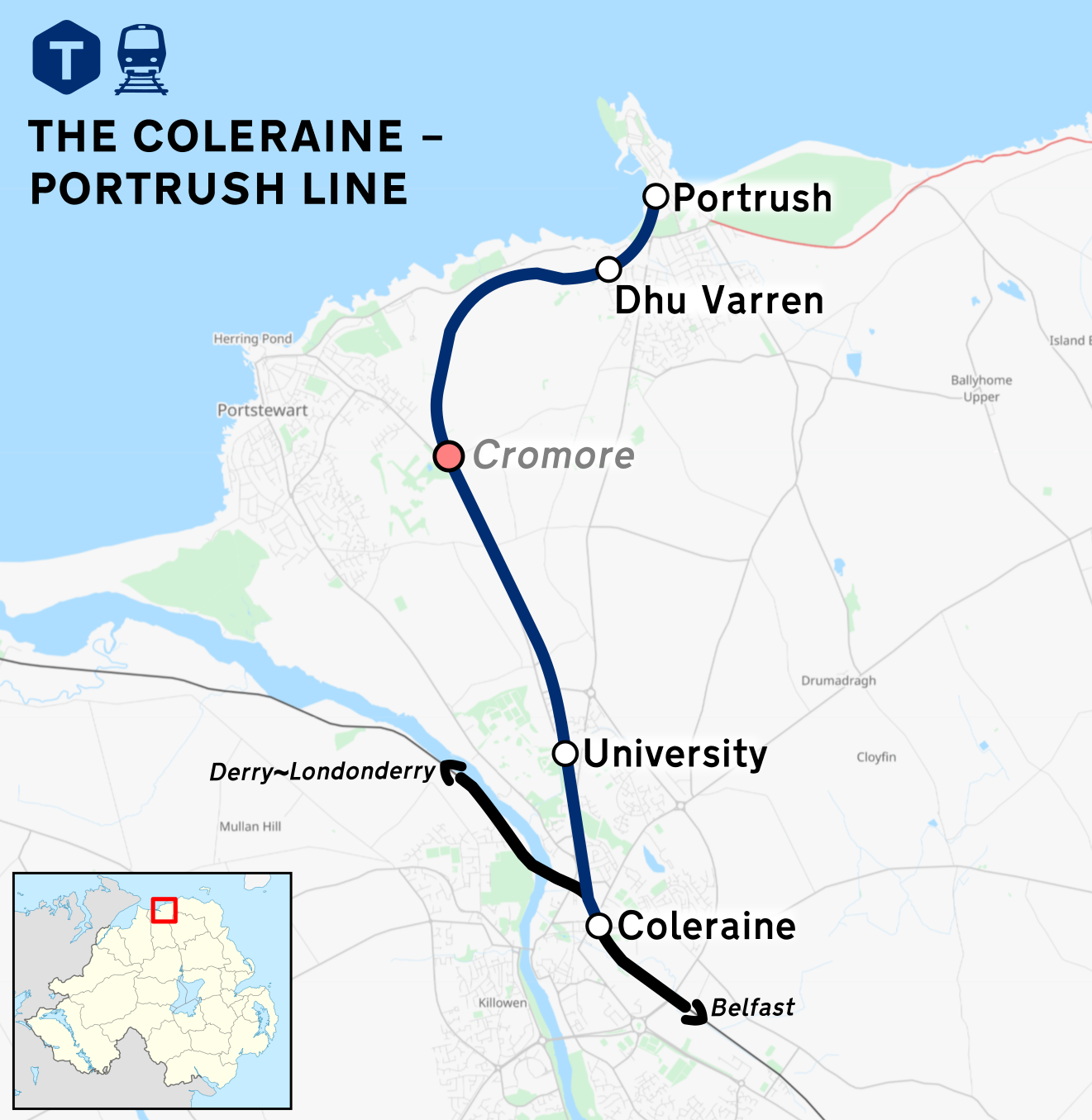
(Click to expand)

The Coleraine–Portrush line is a short railway branch line in Northern Ireland, connecting the town of Coleraine in County Londonderry to the seaside resort of Portrush in County Antrim. Operated by NI Railways and referred to as the Portrush Line, it links to the main Belfast–Derry line at Coleraine, with intermediate halts at University and Dhu Varren.

== History ==
The Coleraine–Portrush line traces its origins to the mid-19th century, authorised in 1853 as part of the Ballymena, Ballymoney, Coleraine and Portrush Junction Railway. Engineered by Charles Lanyon and constructed by the contractor William Dargan, the line opened in 1855, initially serving as a junction for the Derry line at Coleraine after 1860. A notable feature of its early years was the Portstewart Tramway, linked via the intermediate station at Cromore, which closed in 1964, briefly reopened in 1968, and shuttered permanently in 1988.

During the 1960s, winter services were until the establishment of the New University of Ulster (now Ulster University) near Coleraine prompted their revival in 1968. To accommodate student travel, new halts at University (1968) and Dhu Varren (1969) were introduced. Despite infrastructure decline in the 1980s and 1990s, strategic upgrades in the 2000s, including platform extensions and station modernisations, ensured the line's survival for both commuters and tourists.

== Services ==
On weekdays, the first two morning trains from Portrush operate as direct services to Belfast Grand Central Station, streamlining commutes to the capital. Subsequent departures run hourly between Portrush and Coleraine, with transfers at Coleraine for services to all stations on the Derry~Londonderry line. Saturdays replicate this pattern, while Sundays offer hourly Portrush–Coleraine shuttles, augmented by two-hourly extensions to Belfast. Passengers bound for Castlerock, Bellarena, or Derry~Londonderry Waterside must transfer daily at Coleraine, as these destinations lie on the main Belfast–Derry line.

== Infrastructure and modernisation ==
=== Portrush station upgrade (2019) ===
The old concrete station was replaced in 2019 with a contemporary facility designed by Gregory Architects. Featuring floor-to-ceiling glass walls, coloured facade panels, and skylights, the station prioritises natural light and accessibility. While ticket gates are absent, it supports Translink’s updated ticketing systems.

=== Platform extensions (2023) ===
In 2023, platforms at University and Dhu Varren were extended to 150 meters to accommodate six-carriage trains, boosting capacity for Ulster University students and tourists. The project required a three-week line closure between Coleraine and Portrush, with bus substitutions provided.

== Gallery ==
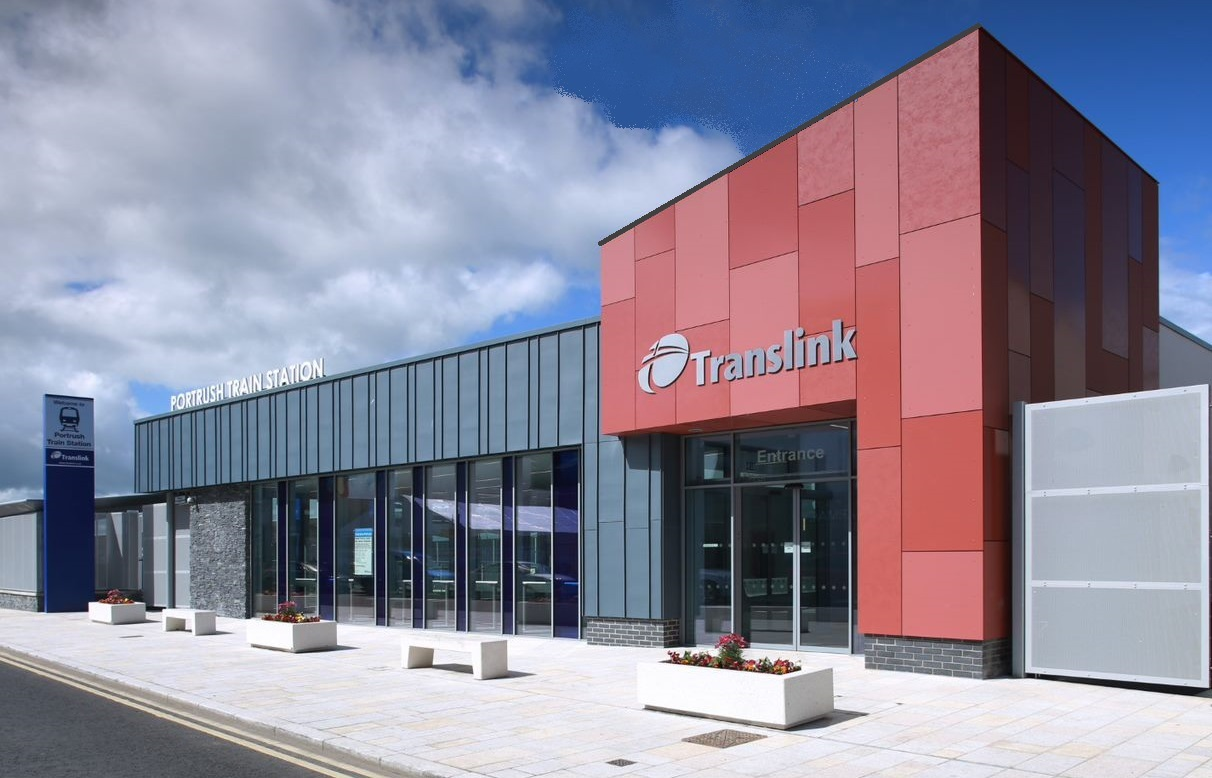
Portrush Train station in 2019

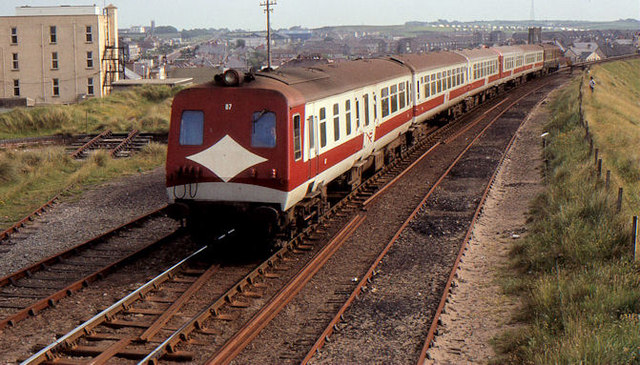
Arrival, Portrush station 22 June 1985

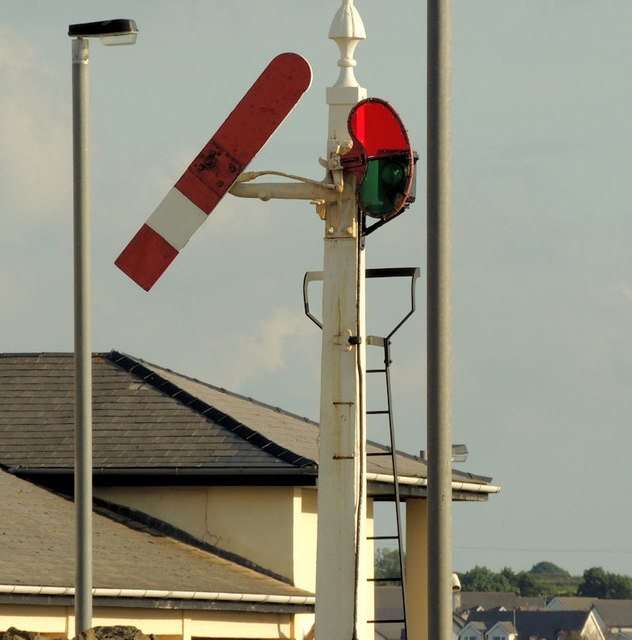
Somersault signal, Portrush station

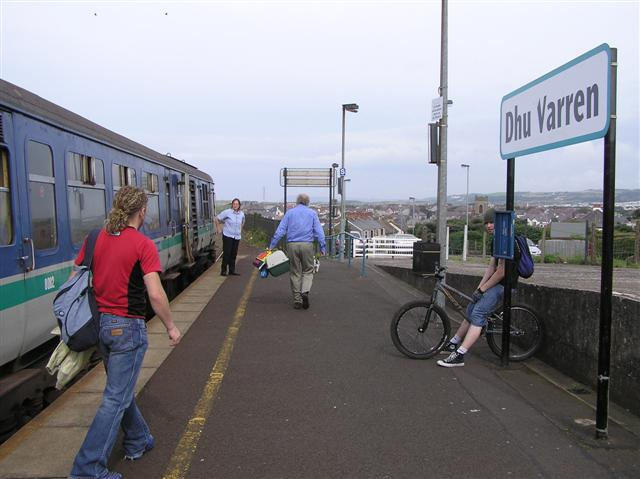
Dhu Varren Halt 2006

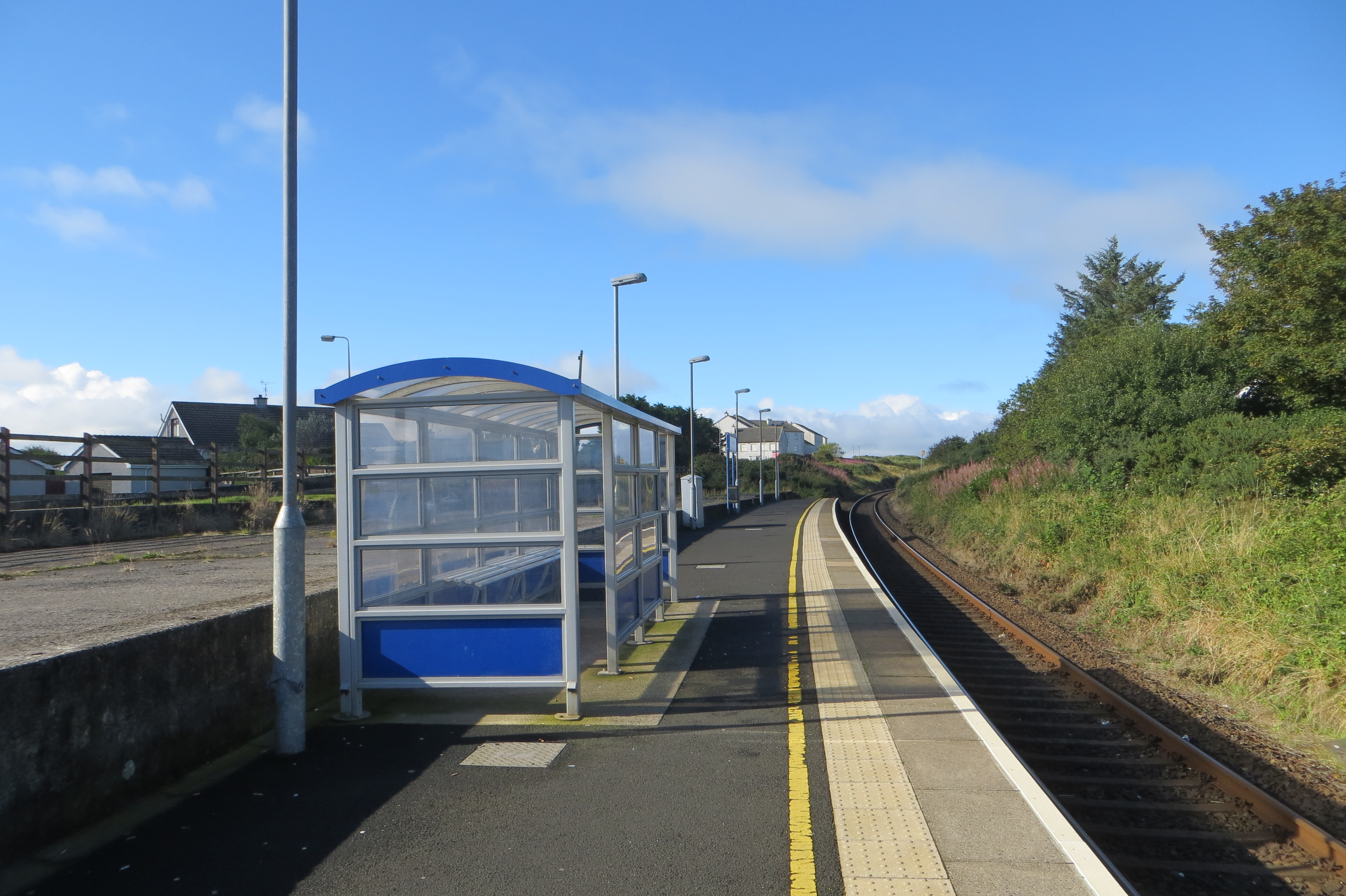
Dhu Varren Halt 2015
