= University railway station (Northern Ireland) =

Railway station in Coleraine, Northern Ireland

University
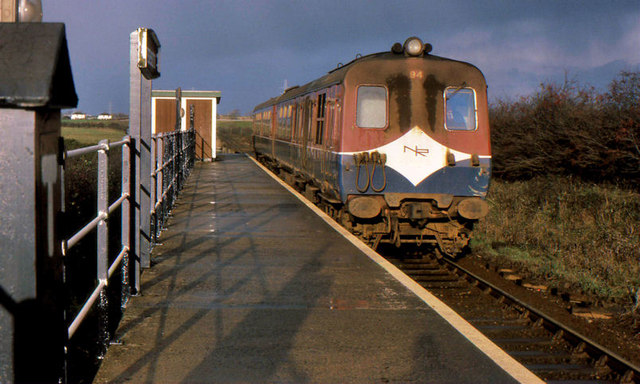
- NIR Class 80 train at University station in 1979

General information
- Location: Cromore Road; Coleraine; Causeway Coast and Glens; Northern Ireland
- Coordinates: 55°09′02″N 6°40′06″W
- Owner: NI Railways
- Operator: NI Railways
- Line: Coleraine–Portrush
- Platforms: 1
- Tracks: 1

Construction
- Structure type: At-grade
- Parking: No
- Cycle facilities: No
- Accessible: Step-free ramped access to platform

Other information
- Status: Open
- Station code: UV
- Fare zone: iLink Zone 4 & North West
- Website: translink.co.uk/University

Key dates
- 12 June 1968: Opened

Passengers
- 2022/23: 108,396
- 2023/24: ▲121,621
- 2024/25: ▲149,088
- 2025/26: ▲155,473

Services
Preceding station	NI Railways	Following station
Dhu Varren towards Portrush	Coleraine–Portrush railway line	Coleraine towards Coleraine or Belfast Grand Central
- NI Railways; Translink; NI railway stations
Route map
(Click to expand)
Location
- Location within Northern Ireland Location within island of Ireland
- Location near Ulster University Coleraine campus
Notes
- Passenger statistics are Translink railway station footfall counts rather than accredited passenger-journey statistics.

University is a halt serving the University of Ulster at Coleraine in County Londonderry, Northern Ireland. It is within the townland of Ballysally in the north of Coleraine. It is a single line halt on the Coleraine-Portrush railway line with a single platform and shelter, and is unstaffed.

The halt is often extremely busy because of its proximity to the university. Portrush has a large number of students living in it and many of them use the train. It is also used by many passengers to connect to the mainline station at Coleraine for onward journeys to Derry and Belfast.

It was opened on 12 June 1968.

== Service ==
Monday to Friday, first two trains from Portrush are through trains to Belfast Grand Central then the rest of the day an hourly service operates to Coleraine and Portrush.

On Saturdays, the first train from Portrush is a through train to Belfast Grand Central, then the rest of the day an hourly service operates to Coleraine and Portrush.

On Sunday, there is an hourly service to Portrush and Coleraine, with the service extending to Belfast Grand Central every two hours.
