= You Keep It All In =

1989 single by the Beautiful South

Single by the Beautiful South

from the album Welcome to the Beautiful South
- B-side: "I Love You (But You're Boring)", "You Just Can't Smile It Away"
- Released: September 1989
- Length: 2:53
- Label: Go! Discs
- Songwriters: Paul Heaton, Dave Rotheray
- Producer: Mike Hedges

The Beautiful South singles chronology
"Song for Whoever" (1989)	"You Keep It All In" (1989)	"I'll Sail This Ship Alone" (1989)

"You Keep It All In" is the second single released from English pop rock group the Beautiful South's debut album, Welcome to the Beautiful South (1989). It reached number eight on the UK Singles Chart and number three in Ireland. "You Keep It All In" was also a hit on American alternative radio, peaking at number 19 on the Billboard Modern Rock Tracks chart in April 1990.

== Track listings ==
7-inch, cassette, and mini-CD single

1. "You Keep It All In" – 2:52
2. "I Love You (But You're Boring)" – 4:28

12-inch and CD single

1. "You Keep It All In" – 2:52
2. "You Just Can't Smile It Away" – 3:24
3. "I Love You (But You're Boring)" – 4:28
4. "You Keep It All In" (instrumental) – 2:52

== Charts ==
=== Weekly charts ===
Chart (1989–1990)	Peak position
Europe (Eurochart Hot 100)	25
Ireland (IRMA)	3
UK Singles (Official Charts)	8
US Modern Rock Tracks (Billboard)	19
West Germany (GfK)	37

=== Year-end charts ===
Chart (1989)	Position
UK Singles (OCC)	81

== Certifications ==
Region	Certification	Certified units/sales
United Kingdom (BPI)	Silver	200,000^{‡}
^{‡} Sales+streaming figures based on certification alone.

== Release history ==
Region	Date	Format(s)	Label(s)	Ref.
United Kingdom	September 1989	7-inch vinyl; 12-inch vinyl; CD; cassette	Go! Discs	
Australia	4 June 1990	7-inch vinyl; CD; cassette	Go! Discs; London; Polydor	
