= Song for Whoever =

1989 single by The Beautiful South

Single by the Beautiful South

from the album Welcome to the Beautiful South
- B-side: "Straight in at 37"; "You and Your Big Ideas"
- Released: 1 June 1989
- Length: 6:10 (album version); 4:00 (single version)
- Label: Go! Discs
- Composers: Paul Heaton; Dave Rotheray
- Lyricist: Paul Heaton
- Producer: Mike Hedges

The Beautiful South singles chronology
"Song for Whoever" (1989)	"You Keep It All In" (1989)

"Song for Whoever" is a song by English music group the Beautiful South, written by band members Paul Heaton and David Rotheray. The first and highest-charting single from their debut album, Welcome to the Beautiful South, it peaked at number two on the UK Singles Chart in July 1989 and was certified gold by the British Phonographic Industry (BPI) in August 2024. Considered typical of the band's gently subversive, self-reflexive signature style, it is sung from the point of view of a cynical songwriter who romances women solely to get material for love songs.

== Music video ==
The music video for the song features a blancmange as the main character. Heaton said, "The blancmange is probably the best thing that's happened to the band so far. The idea is that there's this conveyor belt and all these pop stars come down it and get rejected by the record company people that then choose a blancmange. The blancmange goes on to be a big star but it all pretty much ends up in blancmange misery."

== Track listings ==
All lyrics are written by Paul Heaton; all music is composed by Paul Heaton and Dave Rotheray.

7-inch, cassette, and mini-CD single
No.	Title	Length
1.	"Song for Whoever"
2.	"Straight in at 37"

12-inch and CD single
No.	Title	Length
1.	"Song for Whoever"	4:00
2.	"Straight in at 37"	4:25
3.	"You and Your Big Ideas"	4:15

== Charts ==
=== Weekly charts ===
Chart (1989–1990)	Peak position
Austria (Ö3 Austria Top 40)	30
Belgium (Ultratop 50 Flanders)	22
Canada Top Singles (RPM)	87
Europe (Eurochart Hot 100)	8
Ireland (IRMA)	5
Netherlands (Dutch Top 40)	17
Netherlands (Single Top 100)	22
UK Singles (Official Charts)	2
West Germany (GfK)	21

=== Year-end charts ===
Chart (1989)	Position
UK Singles (OCC)	47

== Certifications ==
Region	Certification	Certified units/sales
United Kingdom (BPI)	Gold	400,000^{‡}
^{‡} Sales+streaming figures based on certification alone.
