= Briana Corrigan =

Northern Ireland singer (born 1965)

- Born: 30 May 1965 (age 61); Belfast, Northern Ireland
- Genre: Pop rock
- Instruments: Vocals, guitar
- Years active: 1980s–present
- Formerly of: The Anthill Runaways; The Beautiful South

Briana Corrigan (born 30 May 1965) is a Northern Irish singer. She was a member of The Beautiful South from 1988 to 1992.

== Early life ==
Corrigan was born in Northern Ireland. When she was 11 years old, her family moved from Belfast to Portstewart, County Londonderry, where she attended Dominican College, Portstewart, the school at which her mother taught. She moved to Newcastle upon Tyne in England at the age of 18 to study for a BA in creative and performing arts.

== The Beautiful South ==
While studying in Newcastle upon Tyne, Corrigan began singing with The Anthill Runaways. Go! Discs Records, which was considering signing the band, made her an offer to travel to Hull and sing with Paul Heaton and Dave Hemingway of The Beautiful South. Soon after she was asked to go to Milan with the band to help record their debut album, Welcome to the Beautiful South. She appeared alongside Dave Hemingway on the band's only UK Singles Chart number 1 single, "A Little Time".

After appearing on three albums, Corrigan left the band in 1992 to pursue a solo career. The decision was driven by a desire to record her own work and partly by ethical disagreements with some of Heaton's lyrics, particularly songs such as "36D", which criticised British glamour models and the industry that employed them.

Her time with the band culminated in one of the fastest-selling British albums in history, Carry on up the Charts: The Best of the Beautiful South.

== Solo career ==
After she left the band, Corrigan reunited with producer Mike Hedges who had produced the first two Beautiful South Albums, and recorded the critically acclaimed solo album, When My Arms Wrap You Round, in 1996 on East West Records. The first single, "Love Me Now", peaked on the UK Singles Chart at No.48. This was the only single released, as Corrigan and her record company parted company a few months after the album's release. Until October 2022, she taught singing at the British School al Khubairat.

== Discography ==
Studio albums

- When My Arms Wrap You Round (1996)
- Redbird (2012)
- Driving Home for Christmas (2021)

Singles

- Sweet Songbird (2022)
- The Young Dublin Rose (2024)
- Caledonia (2025)
