= Dhu Varren railway station =

Railway station in Portrush, Northern Ireland

Dhu Varren
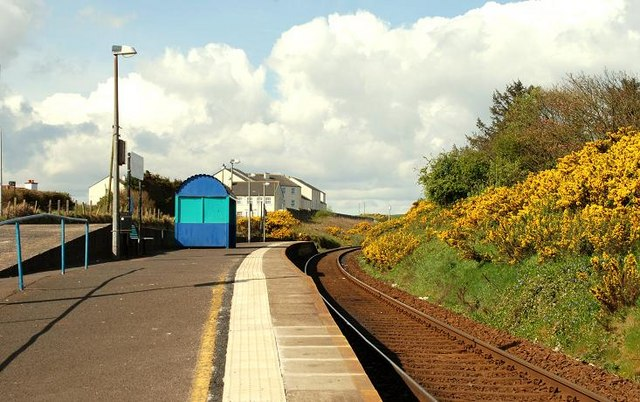

General information
- Location: Dhu Varren Park; Portrush, County Antrim; Northern Ireland
- Coordinates: 55°11′47″N 6°39′41″W
- Owner: NI Railways
- Operator: NI Railways
- Line: Coleraine–Portrush
- Platforms: 1
- Tracks: 1

Construction
- Structure type: At-grade
- Parking: No
- Cycle facilities: No
- Accessible: Step-free ramp access

Other information
- Station code: DV
- Fare zone: iLink Zone 4 & North West

Key dates
- 10 February 1969: Opened
- 2008: Refurbished
- 25 September 2023: Reopened following platform extension

Passengers
- 2022/23: 24,494
- 2023/24: ▼21,221
- 2024/25: ▲33,237
- 2025/26: ▲34,740

Services
| Preceding station | NI Railways | Following station |
|---|---|---|
| Portrush Terminus | Coleraine–Portrush railway line | University towards Coleraine or Belfast Grand Central |
- NI Railways; Translink; NI railway stations
Route map
(Click to expand)
Location
- Location within Northern Ireland Location within island of Ireland

Dhu Varren is a railway halt in the townland of Glenmanus at the western edge of Portrush in County Antrim, Northern Ireland. It is an unstaffed halt on the Coleraine-Portrush railway line, less than a mile from the terminus, with a single platform.

It was opened on 10 February 1969 mainly to cater for travel to the station at Coleraine University.

== Service ==
Monday to Friday, the first 2 trains from Portrush are through trains to Belfast Grand Central then the rest of the day an hourly service operates to Coleraine and Portrush.

On Saturdays, the first train from Portrush is a through train to Belfast Grand Central. For the rest of the day, an hourly service operates to Coleraine and Portrush.

On Sunday, there is an hourly service to Portrush and Coleraine, and a service extension to Belfast Grand Central every two hours.
