= Welcome to the Beautiful South =

- Original cover art by Jan Saudek

Studio album by the Beautiful South
- Released: 23 October 1989
- Recorded: 1988
- Genre: Indie pop
- Length: 50:17
- Labels: Go! Discs, London
- Producers: Mike Hedges; John Rowley (track "I Love You (But You're Boring)")

The Beautiful South chronology
| Welcome to the Beautiful South (1989) | Choke (1990) |

Singles from Welcome to the Beautiful South
- 1. "Song for Whoever" Released: June 1989; 2. "You Keep It All In" Released: 11 September 1989; 3. "I'll Sail This Ship Alone" Released: 20 November 1989

Alternative cover
- Amended album cover

Welcome to the Beautiful South is the debut album by the English band the Beautiful South. It was released on 23 October 1989 by Go! Discs and the next year in the United States by Elektra Records. Three singles were released from the album, which became top 40 hits in the United Kingdom: "Song for Whoever" (No. 2), "You Keep It All In" (No. 8) and "I'll Sail This Ship Alone" (No. 31).

The original album cover depicted two pictures by Jan Saudek, one of a woman with a gun in her mouth, and another with a man smoking. Woolworths refused to stock the album, in the words of the band, to "prevent the hoards [sic] of impressionable young fans from blowing their heads off in a gun-gobbling frenzy, or taking up smoking"; An alternative cover featuring a picture of a stuffed toy rabbit and a teddy bear was therefore made. A second alternative cover was also prepared for the Canadian edition of the album; this version omitted the picture of the woman, and featured only the smoking man.

== Critical reception ==
Professional ratings
Review scores
| Source | Rating |
|---|---|
| AllMusic | 4.5/5 stars |
| Calgary Herald | B+ |
| Los Angeles Times | 4/5 stars |
| NME | 5/10 |
| Orlando Sentinel | 4/5 stars |
| The Rolling Stone Album Guide | 4/5 stars |
| The Village Voice | A− |

The Calgary Herald stated that "Paul Heaton and Dave Hemingway set killer-clever lyrics against clean, techno-free arrangements." The Times noted the success of the first two singles, but opined that the rest of the album "offers little advance on that same tuneful but ineffably twee indie-pop formula."

NME included the album in their "Top 100 Albums You've Never Heard" list, in 2012.

== Track listing ==
All songs written by Paul Heaton and Dave Rotheray, except where noted.

1. "Song for Whoever" – 6:10
2. "Have You Ever Been Away?" – 5:12
3. "From Under the Covers" – 4:05
4. "I'll Sail This Ship Alone" – 4:41
5. "Girlfriend" (Antonio Reid, Kenneth "Babyface" Edmonds) – 2:54
6. "Straight In at 37" – 4:29 (cassette and CD bonus track)
7. "You Keep It All In" – 2:54
8. "Woman in the Wall" – 5:16
9. "Oh Blackpool" – 3:01
10. "Love Is..." – 7:04
11. "I Love You (But You're Boring)" – 4:31

1998/2004 Japanese CD reissue bonus tracks

1. "You and Your Big Ideas"
2. "You Just Can't Smile It Away" (Bill Withers)
3. "It's Instrumental"
4. "But 'Til Then"
5. "I'll Sail This Ship Alone" (Orchestral Mix)

== Non-LP/CD B-Sides ==
As what was to become their modus operandi, Welcome to The Beautiful South included unreleased material on the B-sides of the singles taken from their albums.

from the "Song for Whoever" 12-inch single and CDEP

- "Song for Whoever"
- "Straight in at 37"
- "You and Your Big Ideas"

from the "You Keep It All In" 12-inch single and CDEP

- "You Keep It All In"
- "You Just Can't Smile It Away" (Bill Withers)
- "I Love You (But You're Boring)"
- "It's Instrumental"

from the "I'll Sail This Ship Alone" 12-inch single and CDEP

- "I'll Sail This Ship Alone" (single mix)
- "I'll Sail This Ship Alone" (LP Mix )
- "But 'Til Then"
- "I'll Sail This Ship Alone" (Orchestral Mix )

== Personnel ==
The Beautiful South

- Paul Heaton – vocals
- Dave Hemingway – vocals
- Dave Rotheray – guitar
- Sean Welch – bass
- Dave Stead – drums

Additional personnel

- Briana Corrigan – vocals
- Pete Wingfield – keyboards, piano
- Mel Wesson – keyboards, drum programs
- Martin Ditcham – percussion
- Peter Thoms – trombone
- Gary Barnacle – saxophone, flute
- John Thirkell – trumpet, fluglehorn

Inside sleeve photography

- John Woods

== Certifications ==
| Region | Certification | Certified units/sales |
|---|---|---|
| United Kingdom (BPI) | Platinum | 300,000^{^} |
^{^} Shipments figures based on certification alone.
