= Coleraine railway station =

Station in County Londonderry, Northern Ireland

Coleraine
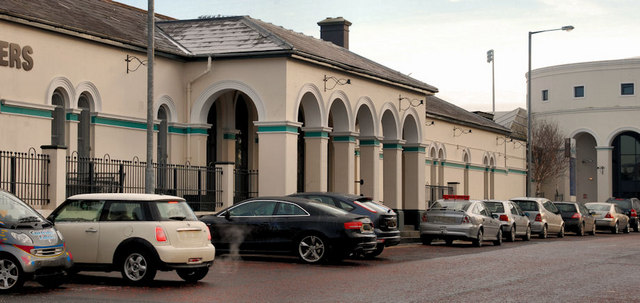

General information
- Location: Railway Place; Coleraine; BT52 1PQ; Causeway Coast and Glens; Northern Ireland
- Coordinates: 55.133856°N 6.662937°W
- Owner: NI Railways
- Operator: NI Railways
- Lines: Derry ~ Londonderry Line; Coleraine–Portrush
- Platforms: 2
- Tracks: 2
- Connections: Ulsterbus services

Construction
- Structure type: At-grade
- Parking: Yes (74 spaces, including 4 accessible spaces)
- Cycle facilities: Yes (32 cycle racks)
- Accessible: Yes (step-free access via ramps and lifts to all platforms)

Other information
- Status: Open
- Station code: CE
- Fare zone: iLink Zone 4 & North West
- Website: translink.co.uk/Coleraine

History
- Original company: Ballymena, Ballymoney, Coleraine and Portrush Junction Railway

Key dates
- 4 December 1855: Opened
- 1965: Goods traffic ceased
- 2000: Interchange station built

Passengers
- 2022/23: 729,029
- 2023/24: ▲920,604
- 2024/25: ▲932,087
- 2025/26: ▲938,424

Services
| Preceding station | NI Railways | Following station |
|---|---|---|
| Castlerock towards Derry~Londonderry | Derry ~ Londonderry Line | Ballymoney towards Belfast Grand Central |
| University towards Portrush | Coleraine–Portrush railway line | Terminus |

Historical railway lines
| Preceding station | Ulster Transport Authority | Following station |
|---|---|---|
| Coleraine Harbour; Line and station closed | Ulster Transport Authority; Harbour Branch | Terminus |
| Preceding station | Londonderry and Coleraine Railway | Following station |
| Barmouth; Line open, station closed | Londonderry and Coleraine Railway; Coleraine–Derry | Terminus |
| Preceding station | Ballymena, Ballymoney, Coleraine and Portrush Junction Railway | Following station |
| Portstewart; Line open, station closed | Ballymena, Ballymoney, Coleraine and Portrush Junction Railway; Ballymena–Portrush | Macfin; Line open, station closed |
- NI Railways; Translink; NI railway stations
Route map
(Click to expand)
Location
- Location within Northern Ireland Location within island of Ireland
- Location in Coleraine
Notes
- Passenger statistics are Translink railway station footfall counts rather than accredited passenger-journey statistics.

Coleraine railway station serves the town of Coleraine in County Londonderry, Northern Ireland. It shares facilities with the town's Ulsterbus bus depot.

== History ==
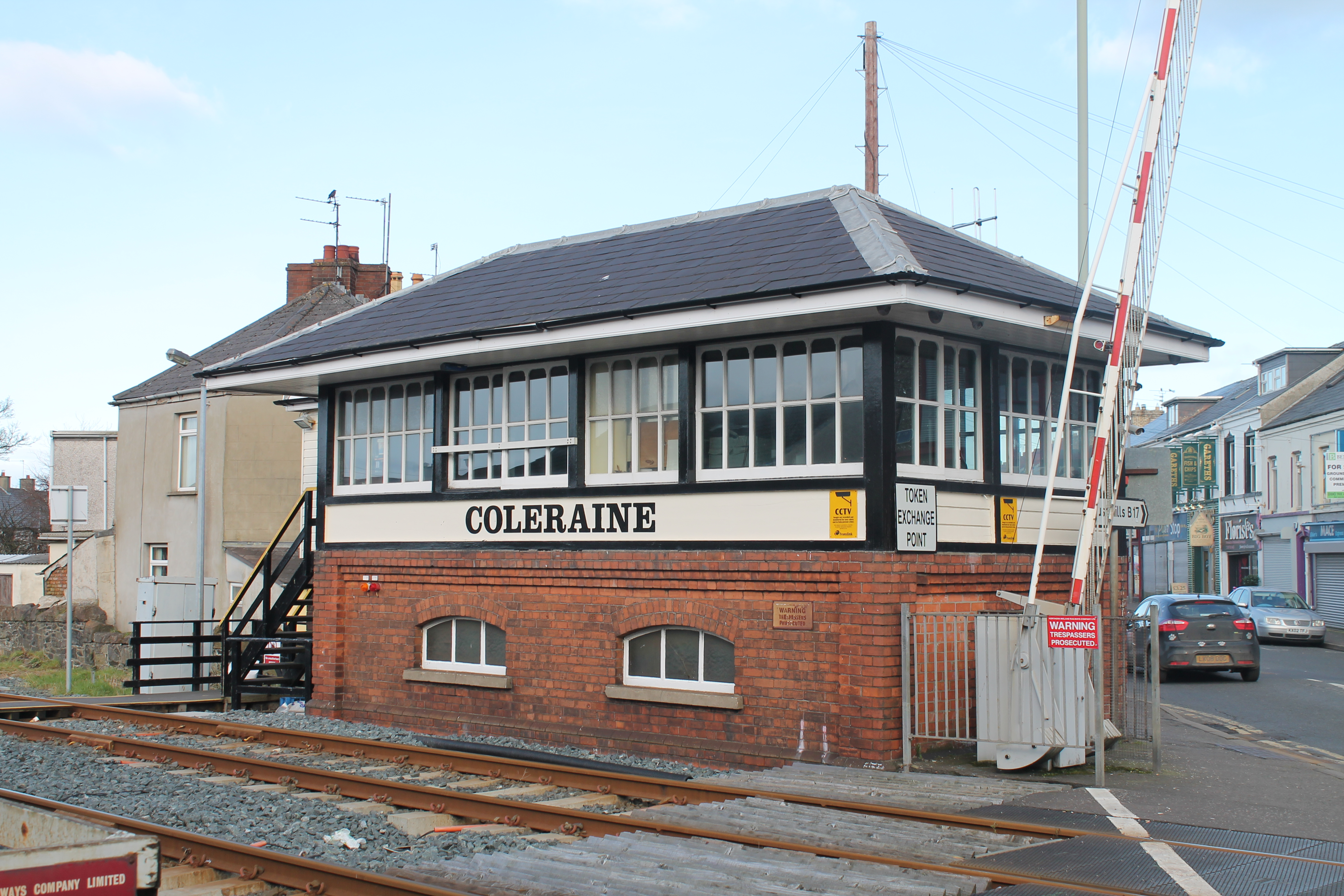
Coleraine Signal Cabin

The station was opened by the Ballymena, Ballymoney, Coleraine and Portrush Junction Railway on 4 December 1855 to designs by the architect Charles Lanyon. A similar range of buildings was provided on the east side of the tracks in the 1880s.

The shared train and bus station building has a distinctive rotunda with a high arched entrance, by GM Design Associates.

A short distance from the station is a bascule bridge over the River Bann accommodating the railway over the river navigation.

== Service ==
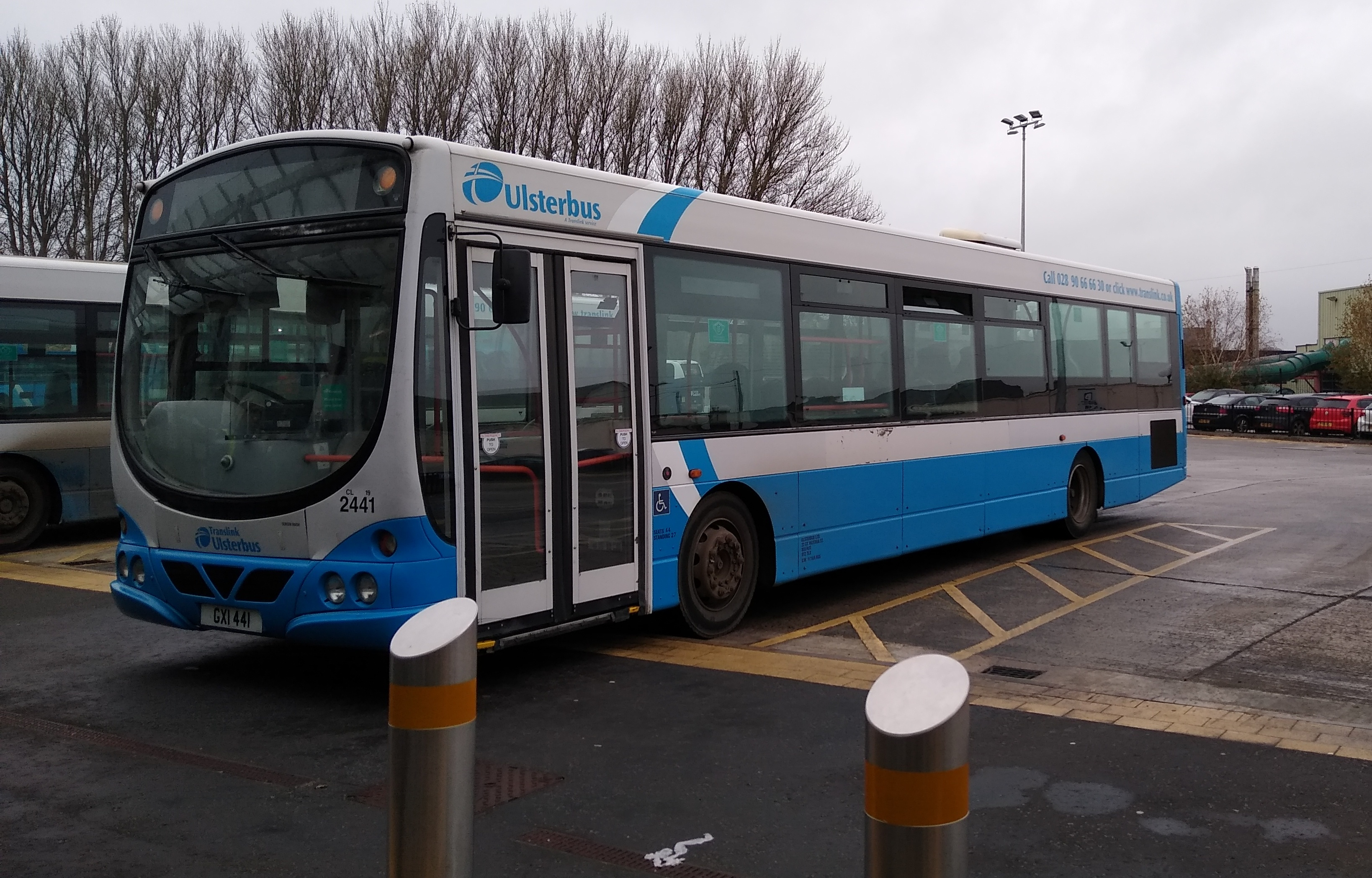
An Ulsterbus bus at the station

=== Train Services ===
On weekdays, there is an hourly service operating to Belfast Grand Central, with extra services at peak times, and some late night and early morning trains terminating here. The service operates hourly in the other direction, terminating at Derry~Londonderry. There is also an hourly service operating to Portrush via the Coleraine-Portrush Line

On Saturdays, the service remains hourly, with no peak time services.

On Sundays, trains alternate between Derry-Londonderry, Portrush and Belfast Grand Central, offering an hourly service from Coleraine to Belfast. This includes 14 trains to and from Portrush, with 8 trains starting/terminating here and 6 trains to and from Derry~Londonderry.

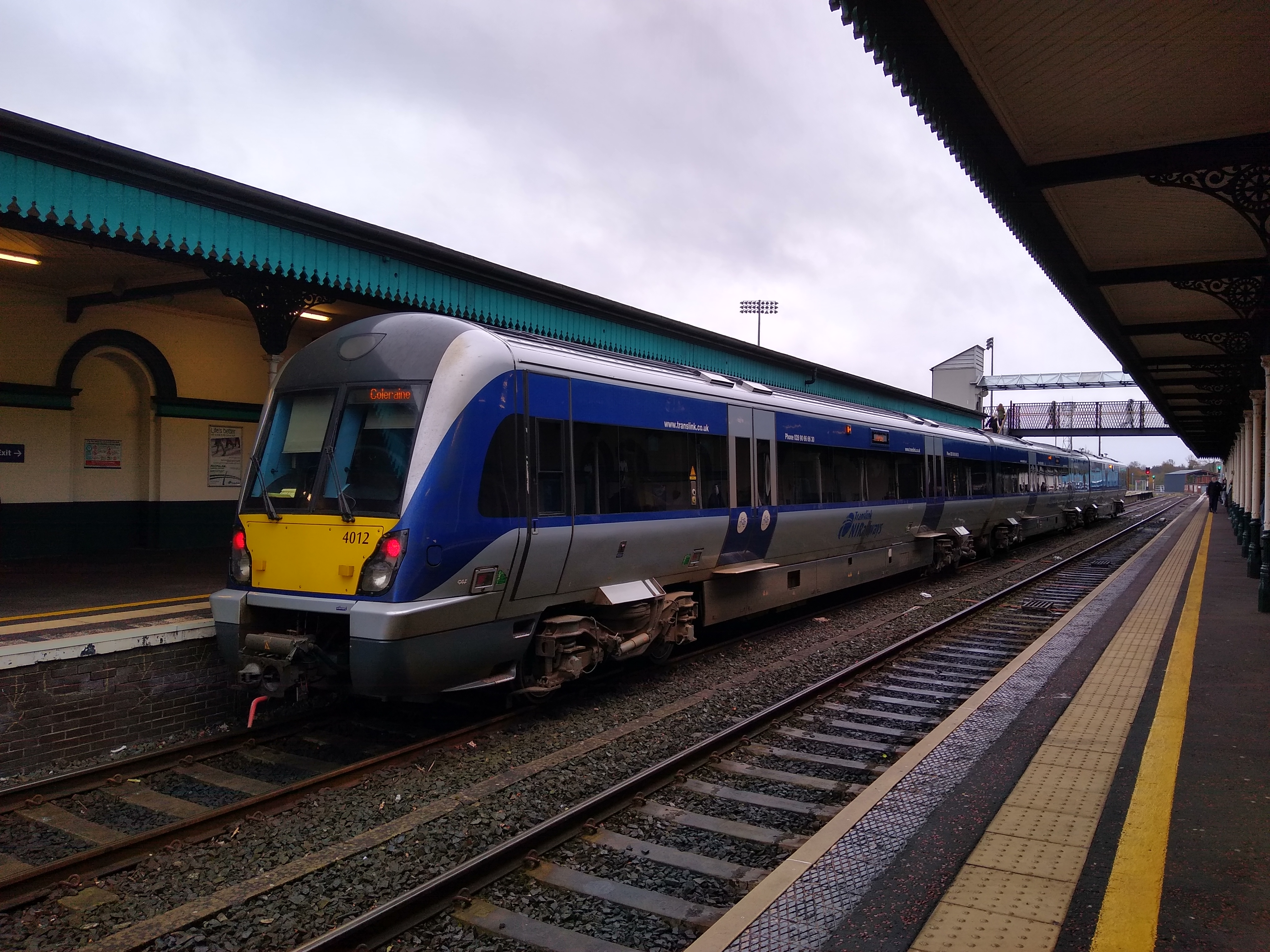
Train in Coleraine.
