= Ballymena, Ballymoney, Coleraine and Portrush Junction Railway =

Coordinates: 54.99545°N 6.37223°W

The Ballymena, Ballymoney, Coleraine and Portrush Junction Railway was an Irish gauge (1,600 mm / 5 ft 3 in) in County Antrim, Northern Ireland.

== History ==
The railway was established under the chairmanship of the Rt Hon Hugh Seymour, with an authorised capital of £200,000 (equivalent to £18,622,538 in 2025).

The line was constructed by William Dargan and opened on 4 December 1855, from Ballymena to Coleraine and Portrush. In January 1861, it was taken over by the Northern Counties Committee under the Belfast and Northern Counties Railway Act 1860 (23 & 24 Vict. c. xlvi).
