= List of UK Country Albums Chart number ones of 2025 =

These are the Official Charts Company's UK Country Albums Chart number ones of 2025. The chart week runs from Friday to Thursday with the chart-date given as the following Thursday. Chart positions are based the multi-metric consumption of country music in the United Kingdom, blending traditional album sales, track equivalent albums, and streaming equivalent albums. The chart contains 20 positions.

In the iteration of the chart dated 3 January, Taylor Swift's re-recording of her 2008 album Fearless spent its 52nd non-consecutive week at number one, and remained in the top spot the following week before being displaced by Look Up, the first country album by Ringo Starr, which remained there for three weeks. Bonnie Prince Billy's The Purple Bird then spent two weeks atop the chart before Starr returned for an additional two weeks and was then replaced by Kip Moore's Solitary Tracks, his second number one album. Following her headlining performance at the C2C: Country to Country festival, Whirlwind by Lainey Wilson returned to number one for a second and third week, after last hitting the top spot in September 2024. Arcadia by Alison Krauss & Union Station, Krauss' sixth UK number one, then claimed the chart peak for three consecutive weeks before being replaced by Send a Prayer My Way, a collaborative project by indie singer-songwriters Julien Baker and Torres. Oh What a Beautiful World became Willie Nelson's eighth chart topper on the chart dated 9 May. I'm the Problem by Morgan Wallen spent three weeks at the top spot, also debuting at number one on the all-genre UK Albums Chart, a rare feat for a country album, before being replaced by Mary Chapin Carpenter's Personal History for three weeks. Following his appearance at the Glastonbury Festival 2025, Shaboozey's Where I've Been, Isn't Where I'm Going reached number one for the first time in its 57th week on the chart. Paul Carrack and Max McNown then each held the top spot for two weeks. Margo Price earned her fourth number one album with Hard Headed Woman on the iteration of the chart dated 12 September, while UK band First Time Flyers achieved their first with debut album Bound to Break on 26 September. Chris Stapleton's 2015 debut album Traveller spent four additional weeks at number one in 2025, bringing its total to ninth non-consecutive weeks atop the chart. In the week of her new album The Life of a Showgirl's release, Taylor Swift's self-titled debut album returned to the top spot on the country chart for its fifth total week at number one and its first time topping the chart since 2009. On the chart dated 26 October, Scottish singer Rianne Downey began a three week stint at number one with her debut album The Consequence of Love, before being displaced by Nelson, who returned to the chart with a new project, Merle Haggard tribute album Workin' Man. Zach Bryan's self-titled second studio album spent the final four weeks of the year in the top spot, its first time at number one despite being released in September 2023. Other artists to reach number one in 2025 include Eric Church, Jordan Davis, Morgan Wade, Kacey Musgraves, and Waylon Jennings.

== Chart history ==
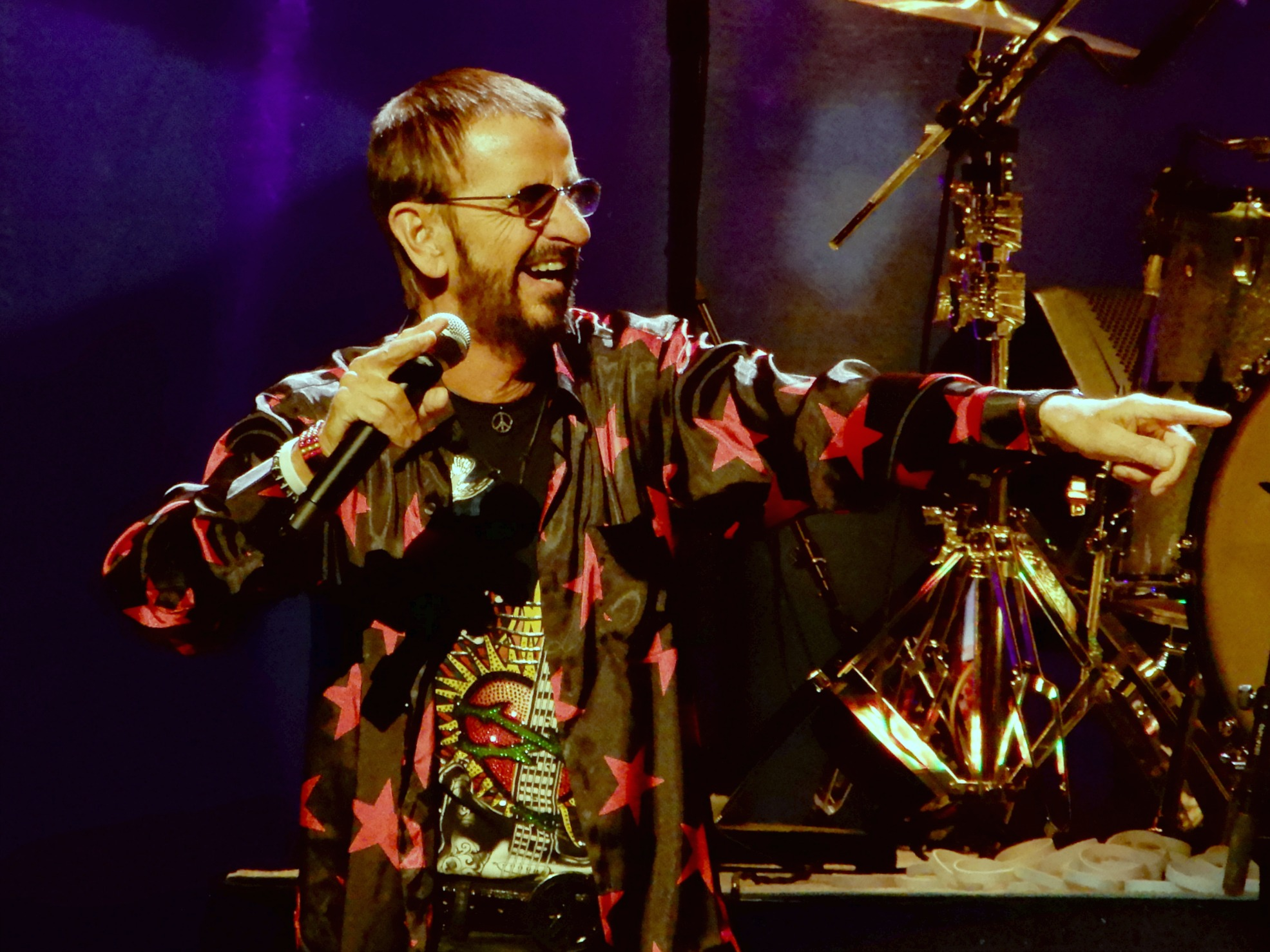
Look Up, the debut country album by Ringo Starr, spent five weeks at number one.

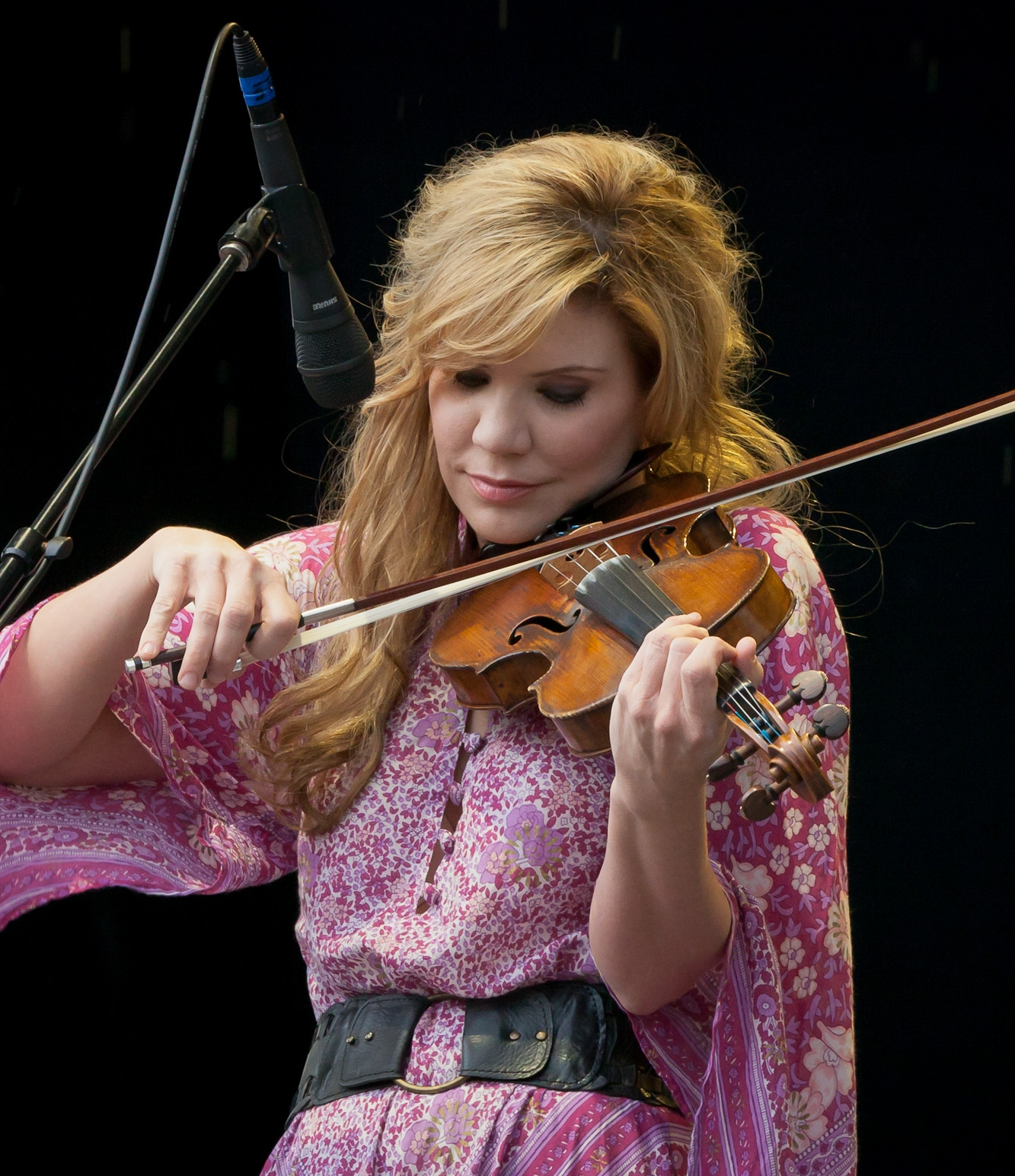
Alison Krauss earned her sixth UK number one with Arcadia alongside her band Union Station.

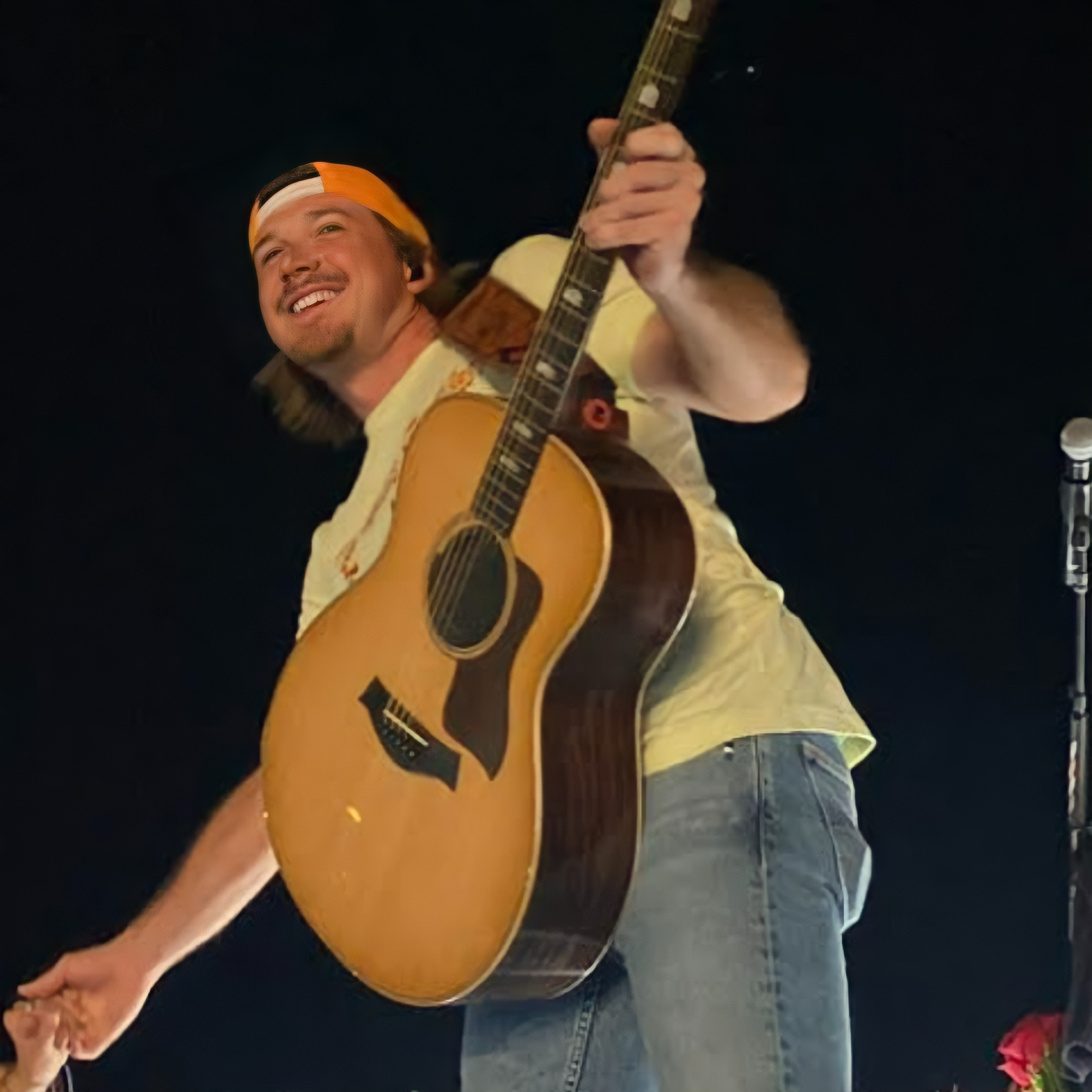
I'm the Problem by Morgan Wallen spent three weeks at number one, and also debuted in the top spot on the all-genre UK Albums Chart.

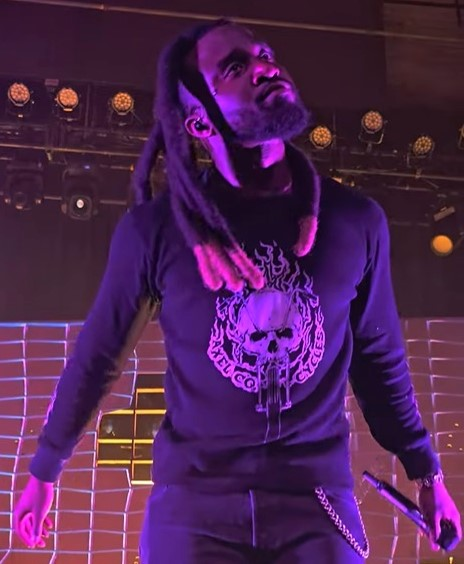
Shaboozey earned his first number one when Where I've Been, Isn't Where I'm Going hit the top spot in its fifty-seventh week on the chart.

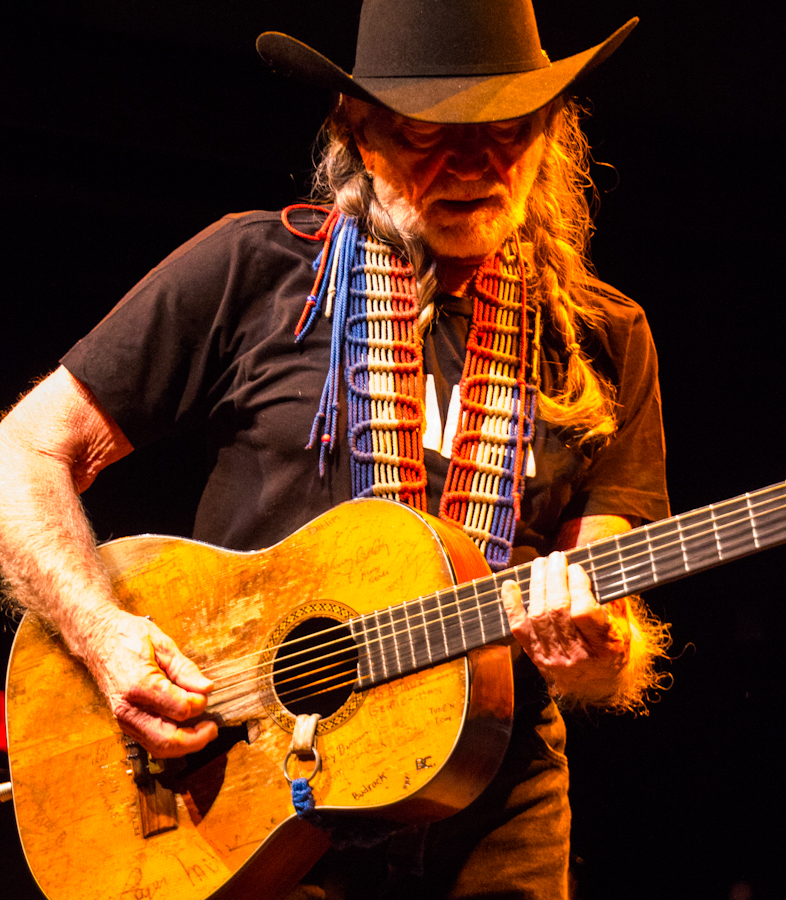
Willie Nelson has two projects top the chart in 2025: Rodney Crowell covers album Oh What a Beautiful World, and Merle Haggard tribute Workin' Man.

Issue date	Album	Artist(s)	Record label	Ref.
3 January	Fearless (Taylor's Version)	Taylor Swift	EMI	
10 January	Fearless (Taylor's Version)	Taylor Swift	EMI	
17 January	Look Up	Ringo Starr	Decca	
24 January	Look Up	Ringo Starr	Decca	
31 January	Look Up	Ringo Starr	Decca	
7 February	The Purple Bird	Bonnie Prince Billy	Domino	
14 February	The Purple Bird	Bonnie Prince Billy	Domino	
21 February	Look Up	Ringo Starr	Decca	
28 February	Look Up	Ringo Starr	Decca	
7 March	Solitary Tracks	Kip Moore	MCA Nashville	
14 March	Solitary Tracks	Kip Moore	MCA Nashville	
21 March	Whirlwind	Lainey Wilson	Broken Bow	
28 March	Whirlwind	Lainey Wilson	Broken Bow	
4 April	Arcadia	Alison Krauss & Union Station	Down the Road	
11 April	Arcadia	Alison Krauss & Union Station	Down the Road	
18 April	Arcadia	Alison Krauss & Union Station	Down the Road	
25 April	Send a Prayer My Way	Julien Baker & Torres	Matador	
2 May	Send a Prayer My Way	Julien Baker & Torres	Matador	
9 May	Oh What a Beautiful World	Willie Nelson	Legacy	
16 May	Evangeline vs. the Machine	Eric Church	Snakefarm/EMI Nashville	
23 May	I'm the Problem	Morgan Wallen	EMI	
30 May	I'm the Problem	Morgan Wallen	EMI	
6 June	I'm the Problem	Morgan Wallen	EMI	
13 June	Personal History	Mary Chapin Carpenter	Lambent Light	
20 June	Personal History	Mary Chapin Carpenter	Lambent Light	
27 June	Personal History	Mary Chapin Carpenter	Lambent Light	
4 July	Where I've Been, Isn't Where I'm Going	Shaboozey	American Dogwood/Empire	
11 July	The Country Side of Paul Carrack: Vol. 1	Paul Carrack	Carrack UK	
18 July	The Country Side of Paul Carrack: Vol. 1	Paul Carrack	Carrack UK	
25 July	Night Diving	Max McNown	Fugitive	
1 August	Night Diving	Max McNown	Fugitive	
8 August	The Party is Over	Morgan Wade	Sony	
15 August	Deeper Well	Kacey Musgraves	Interscope	
22 August	Learn the Hard Way	Jordan Davis	MCA Nashville	
29 August	Learn the Hard Way	Jordan Davis	MCA Nashville	
5 September	Traveller	Chris Stapleton	Mercury Nashville	
12 September	Hard Headed Woman	Margo Price	Loma Vista	
19 September	Traveller	Chris Stapleton	Mercury Nashville	
26 September	Bound to Break	First Time Flyers	Lookout Mountain	
3 October	Traveller	Chris Stapleton	Mercury Nashville	
10 October	Taylor Swift	Taylor Swift	Mercury	
17 October	Songbird	Waylon Jennings	Son of Jessi	
26 October	The Consequence of Love	Rianne Downey	Modern Sky/Run On	
31 October	The Consequence of Love	Rianne Downey	Modern Sky/Run On	
7 November	The Consequence of Love	Rianne Downey	Modern Sky/Run On	
14 November	Workin' Man	Willie Nelson	Sony Music	
21 November	Workin' Man	Willie Nelson	Sony Music	
28 November	Traveller	Chris Stapleton	Mercury Nashville	
5 December	Zach Bryan	Zach Bryan	Warner Records	
12 December	Zach Bryan	Zach Bryan	Warner Records	
19 December	Zach Bryan	Zach Bryan	Warner Records	
26 December	Zach Bryan	Zach Bryan	Warner Records	

== Most weeks at number one ==
Weeks at number one	Artist
5	Ringo Starr
4	Chris Stapleton
4	Zach Bryan
3	Alison Krauss & Union Station
3	Mary Chapin Carpenter
3	Morgan Wallen
3	Rianne Downey
3	Taylor Swift
3	Willie Nelson
2	Bonnie Prince Billy
2	Jordan Davis
2	Julien Baker & Torres
2	Kip Moore
2	Lainey Wilson
2	Max McNown
2	Paul Carrack

== See also ==
- List of UK Albums Chart number ones of 2025
- List of UK Dance Singles Chart number ones of 2025
- List of UK Album Downloads Chart number ones of 2025
- List of UK Independent Albums Chart number ones of 2025
- List of UK R&B Albums Chart number ones of 2025
- List of UK Rock & Metal Albums Chart number ones of 2025
- List of UK Compilation Chart number ones of the 2020s
