= List of UK Dance Albums Chart number ones of 2025 =

These are the Official Charts Company's UK Dance Albums Chart number ones of 2025. The chart week runs from Friday to Thursday with the chart-date given as the following Thursday.

== Chart history ==
Issue date	Album	Artist(s)	Record label	Ref.
2 January	Brat	Charli XCX	Atlantic	
9 January	Brat	Charli XCX	Atlantic	
16 January	True	Avicii	PRMD,Island	
23 January	True	Avicii	PRMD,Island	
30 January	Dave Pearce Dance Anthems	Various Artists	New State	
6 February	Eusexua	FKA Twigs	Young	
13 February	Eusexua	FKA Twigs	Young	
20 February	Where Things Are Hollow: No Tomorrow	Pye Corner Audio	Lapsus	
27 February	Further Vexations	Black Dog	Dust Science	
6 March	Colours revisted	Adam F	181 Recordings	
13 March	Service Station at the End of the Universe	Antony Szmierek	Mushroom	
20 March	Dave Pearce Trance Anthems	Various Artists	New State	
27 March	Dave Pearce Dance Anthems	Various Artists	New State	
3 April	Dave Pearce Dance Anthems	Various Artists	New State	
10 April	Now Presents...Clubland	Various Artists	EMI/RCA	
17 April	Black Sands	Bonobo	Ninja Tune	
24 April	Dubnobasswithmyheadman	Underworld	Junior Boy's Own	
1 May	Pacha - Ibiza Classics	Various Artists	New State	
8 May	Under Tangled Silence	Djrum	Houndstooth	
15 May	Under Tangled Silence	Djrum	Houndstooth	
22 May	Tall Tales	Mark Pritchard and Thom Yorke	Warp	
29 May	Avicii Forever	Avicii	Pinguettes	
5 June	Pete Tong & Friends - Ibiza Classics	Pete Tong	Ministry of Sound	
12 June	Pete Tong & Friends - Ibiza Classics	Pete Tong	Ministry of Sound	
19 June	Death Mask	Death in Vegas	Drone	
26 June	Mixes of a Lost World	The Cure	Polydor	
3 July	Ibiza 2025	Various Artists	Front of House	
10 July	Brat	Charli XCX	Atlantic	
17 July	Landscape From Melody	Rival Consoles	Erased Tapes	
24 July	Loner	Barry Can't Swim	Ninja Tune	
31 July	B-Sides Mixtape	Bou	Gossip	
7 August	Veronica Electronica	Madonna	Rhino	
14 August	Veronica Electronica	Madonna	Rhino	
21 August	Pacha - Ibiza Classics	Various Artists	New State	
28 August	Flux	Alison Goldfrapp	A.G.	
4 September	Inertia	Pendulum	Mushroom	
11 September	Inertia	Pendulum	Mushroom	
18 September	Champion Sound	Faithless	Faithless	
25 September	Champion Sound	Faithless	Faithless	
2 October	Same Day Cleaning	Sammy Virji	Capitol	
9 October	Surfing on Sine Waves	Polygon Window	Warp	
16 October	Archangel	Kettama	Steel City Dance Discs	
23 October	Buddhist Hipsters	The Orb	Cooking Vinyl	
30 October	All Systems Are Lying	Soulwax	Because Music	
6 November	Cornucopia Live	Björk	One Little Independent Records	
13 November	Tremor	Daniel Avery	Domino	
20 November	Confessions on a Dance Floor	Madonna	Warner	
27 November	CHROMA 000	Bicep	Ninja Tune	
4 December	Contact	Sub Focus	Positiva	
11 December	Contact	Sub Focus	Positiva	
18 December	The Annual 2026	Various Artists	Ministry of Sound	
25 December	TUSB	Fred Again	Atlantic	

== See also ==
- List of UK Albums Chart number ones of 2025
- List of UK Dance Singles Chart number ones of 2025
- List of UK Album Downloads Chart number ones of 2025
- List of UK Independent Albums Chart number ones of 2025
- List of UK R&B Albums Chart number ones of 2025
- List of UK Rock & Metal Albums Chart number ones of 2025
- List of UK Compilation Chart number ones of the 2020s
