= List of UK Independent Singles Chart number ones of 2025 =

These are the Official Charts Company's UK Independent Singles Chart number-one singles of 2025.

== Chart history ==
Chart date (week ending)	Song	Artist(s)	Record label	References
2 January	"Merry Xmas Everybody"	Slade	BMG	
9 January	"A Bar Song (Tipsy)"	Shaboozey	American Dogwood/Empire	
16 January	"A Bar Song (Tipsy)"	Shaboozey	American Dogwood/Empire	
23 January	"A Bar Song (Tipsy)"	Shaboozey	American Dogwood/Empire	
30 January	"A Bar Song (Tipsy)"	Shaboozey	American Dogwood/Empire	
6 February	"A Bar Song (Tipsy)"	Shaboozey	American Dogwood/Empire	
13 February	"A Bar Song (Tipsy)"	Shaboozey	American Dogwood/Empire	
20 February	"A Bar Song (Tipsy)"	Shaboozey	American Dogwood/Empire	
27 February	"A Bar Song (Tipsy)"	Shaboozey	American Dogwood/Empire	
6 March	"A Bar Song (Tipsy)"	Shaboozey	American Dogwood/Empire	
13 March	"A Bar Song (Tipsy)"	Shaboozey	American Dogwood/Empire	
20 March	"A Bar Song (Tipsy)"	Shaboozey	American Dogwood/Empire	
27 March	"A Bar Song (Tipsy)"	Shaboozey	American Dogwood/Empire	
3 April	"Show Me Love"	WizTheMc and Bees & Honey	Bamboo Artists	
10 April	"Show Me Love"	WizTheMc and Bees & Honey	Bamboo Artists	
17 April	"Show Me Love"	WizTheMc and Bees & Honey	Bamboo Artists	
24 April	"Show Me Love"	WizTheMc and Bees & Honey	Bamboo Artists	
1 May	"Show Me Love"	WizTheMc and Bees & Honey	Bamboo Artists	
8 May	"Show Me Love"	WizTheMc and Bees & Honey	Bamboo Artists	
15 May	"Show Me Love"	WizTheMc and Bees & Honey	Bamboo Artists	
22 May	"Show Me Love"	WizTheMc and Bees & Honey	Bamboo Artists	
29 May	"Show Me Love"	WizTheMc and Bees & Honey	Bamboo Artists	
5 June	"Show Me Love"	WizTheMc and Bees & Honey	Bamboo Artists	
12 June	"Show Me Love"	WizTheMc and Bees & Honey	Bamboo Artists	
19 June	"Show Me Love"	WizTheMc and Bees & Honey	Bamboo Artists	
26 June	"Show Me Love"	WizTheMc and Bees & Honey	Bamboo Artists	
3 July	"Show Me Love"	WizTheMc and Bees & Honey	Bamboo Artists	
10 July	"Show Me Love"	WizTheMc and Bees & Honey	Bamboo Artists	
17 July	"Show Me Love"	WizTheMc and Bees & Honey	Bamboo Artists	
24 July	"Show Me Love"	WizTheMc and Bees & Honey	Bamboo Artists	
31 July	"Show Me Love"	WizTheMc and Bees & Honey	Bamboo Artists	
7 August	"Paranoid"	Black Sabbath	Sanctuary	
14 August	"Show Me Love"	WizTheMc & Bees & Honey	Bamboo	
21 August	"Show Me Love"	WizTheMc & Bees & Honey	Bamboo	
28 August	"Show Me Love"	WizTheMc & Bees & Honey	Bamboo	
4 September	"Show Me Love"	WizTheMc & Bees & Honey	Bamboo	
11 September	"Show Me Love"	WizTheMc & Bees & Honey	Bamboo	
18 September	"Show Me Love"	WizTheMc & Bees & Honey	Bamboo	
25 September	"Let Down"	Radiohead	XL	
2 October	"Where Is My Husband!"	Raye	Human Re Sources	
9 October	"Where Is My Husband!"	Raye	Human Re Sources	
16 October	"Where Is My Husband!"	Raye	Human Re Sources	
23 October	"Where Is My Husband!"	Raye	Human Re Sources	
30 October	"Where Is My Husband!"	Raye	Human Re Sources	
6 November	"Where Is My Husband!"	Raye	Human Re Sources	
13 November	"Where Is My Husband!"	Raye	Human Re Sources	
20 November	"Where Is My Husband!"	Raye	Human Re Sources	
27 November	"Where Is My Husband!"	Raye	Human Re Sources	
4 December	"Where Is My Husband!"	Raye	Human Re Sources	
11 December	"Where Is My Husband!"	Raye	Human Re Sources	
18 December	"Where Is My Husband!"	Raye	Human Re Sources	
25 December	"Where Is My Husband!"	Raye	Human Re Sources	

== Notes ==
- ^{a} – The single was simultaneously number-one on the singles chart.
- ^{b} - The artist was simultaneously number one on the Independent Albums Chart.

== Number-one Indie artists ==
Position	Artist	Weeks at number one
1	WizTheMc	24
1	Bees & Honey	24
2	Raye	13
3	Shaboozey	12
4	Slade	1
4	Black Sabbath	1
4	Radiohead	1

== See also ==
- List of UK Dance Singles Chart number ones of 2025
- List of UK R&B Singles Chart number ones of 2025
- List of UK Rock & Metal Singles Chart number ones of 2025
- List of UK Independent Albums Chart number ones of 2025
