= Antony Szmierek =

English poet, spoken-word performer and musician

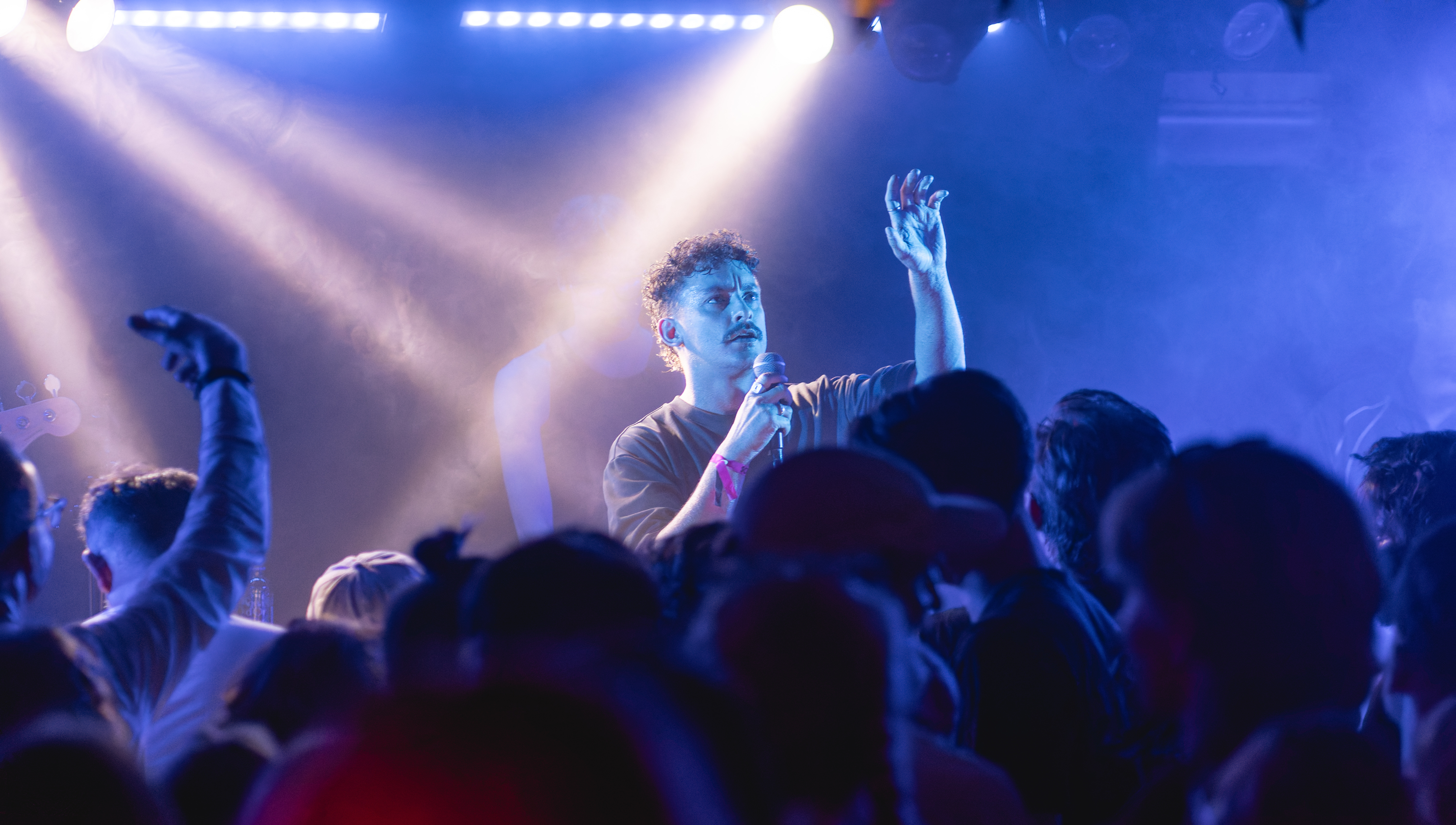
- Antony Szmierek at Way Out West in Sweden in 2024

Background information
- Born: October 1990 (age 35–36)
- Origin: Manchester, England
- Genres: Spoken word; electronic; dance
- Occupations: Poet; musician; producer; spoken-word performer
- Years active: 2018–present
- Label: Mushroom Music / Virgin Music Group

Antony Szmierek is an English poet, spoken-word performer, musician and producer from Greater Manchester whose work combines spoken word with electronic and dance music. He gained wider recognition with the 2022 single "The Hitchhiker's Guide to the Fallacy", which received BBC Radio 6 Music airplay, and was named one of the station's Artists of the Year in 2023.

== Early life and education ==
Szmierek is from Hyde, Greater Manchester. He worked as an English teacher, including at a college for school leavers with special educational needs. Before focusing on music, he self-published the novels The Albatross and The Hypocrite, and performed spoken word at open-mic events in Manchester.

== Career ==
Szmierek began setting his poetry to music during the COVID-19 pandemic, after buying an electric piano. His early releases include Endless Summer (2020) and Giving Up for Beginners (2021). His single "The Hitchhiker's Guide to the Fallacy" received BBC Radio 6 Music airplay and brought him wider attention. He released the EPs Poems to Dance To and Seasoning in 2023, and was named one of BBC Radio 6 Music's Artists of the Year that year. He later left teaching to work in music full-time.

Szmierek has performed at Glastonbury Festival, including two sets in 2023, and recorded a session at BBC Radio 1's Maida Vale Studios.

His debut studio album, Service Station at the End of the Universe, was released on 28 February 2025 through Mushroom Music and Virgin Music Group; its title and songs reference the work of Douglas Adams. It reached number 68 on the UK Albums Chart and number one on the UK Dance Albums Chart.

His sophomore album, Decoding Birdsong (2026), which included singles The Heron, Chalk, Seminal and Flight Simulator reached number 30 in the UK Albums Chart, and number 2 on the UK Dance Albums Chart.

== Musical style ==
Szmierek combines spoken-word delivery with electronic, house and indie influences. He has described his approach as "Sincerity Overdrive".

== Discography ==
Studio albums

- Service Station at the End of the Universe (2025)
- Decoding Birdsong (2026)

Extended plays

- Poems to Dance To (2023)
- Seasoning (2023)

== Chart performance ==
Service Station at the End of the Universe charted in the United Kingdom, including:

- No. 1 – UK Dance Albums Chart
- No. 3 – UK Independent Albums Chart
- No. 8 – UK Vinyl Albums Chart
- No. 11 – UK Physical Albums Chart
- No. 68 – UK Albums Chart

== Bibliography ==
- The Albatross (self-published)
- The Hypocrite (self-published)
- Ultimate Denim Concert USA: An Anthology (2020)
- Roadmap (lyrics, poems, sketches and stories; Faber Music, 2025)
