= Champion Sound (Faithless album) =

Studio album by Faithless
- Released: 5 September 2025
- Length: 75:46
- Producers: Rollo; Sister Bliss

Faithless chronology
All Blessed (2020)	Champion Sound (2025)

Singles from Champion Sound
- 1. "Find a Way" Released: 12 July 2024; 2. "Peace and Noise" Released: 21 March 2025; 3. "Dollars and Dimes" Released: 25 April 2025; 4. "Fugitive" Released: 6 June 2025; 5. "Phone Number" Released: 4 July 2025; 6. "Champion Sound: Side 3 Book of Hours" Released: 8 August 2025

Champion Sound is the eighth studio album by dance music act Faithless. It was released on 5 September 2025, and is their first studio album since 2020's All Blessed, as well as their first album following the death of former frontman Maxi Jazz. The album peaked at number 8 on the Scottish album charts, 30 on the German official album charts and 15 in the UK.

== Background ==
Former lead singer Maxi Jazz died in December 2022. In April 2024, Faithless stated, "Maxi died just over a year ago and obviously we miss him every day. Thank you for all your kind words of support over this last year. It has really, really meant a lot. In the meantime, we never stopped (couldn't stop, never wanted to stop!) making music. Even during Maxi's long illness we recorded and released 'All Blessed', and now finally, eight years after our last live performance, we are returning to festival stages [...] we are, in fact, in the studio as we write this." Faithless announced the title of the album on the same day that lead single, "Find a Way", was released.

== Singles ==
The album's lead single, "Find a Way", was released on 12 July 2024, and features vocals by Suli Breaks. An official music video, directed by Benn Veasey, was released on 18 July 2024.

"I'm Not Alone (Rest Well Maxwell)" was released as the second single on 30 August 2024. Collaborator Amelia Fox and LSK feature. The song mentions a number of deceased music artists including: Amy Winehouse, Tupac Shakur, Craig Mack, Kurt Cobain, Avicii and Left Eye.

On 25 April 2025, Faithless released the single "Dollars and Dimes", featuring Bebe Rexha.

On 4 September 2025, Faithless released a new, promotional single-version of "Find a Way", featuring Suli Breaks and previous collaborator Dido; Dido sings a new verse and chorus on the updated track.

== Critical reception ==
Robin Murray, reviewing for Clash gave the album an 8/10 score, opining, "The beauty of this album lies in its versatility – each part has its own identity, yet the whole can be experienced as a unified journey or enjoyed in isolation. It’s a sonic experience that defies convention, Faithless have crafted an album that not only honours their legacy but also pushes their sound into bold new territory, making ‘Champion Sound’ a bold, boundary-pushing leap that reaffirms their place at the forefront of dance music".

== Track listing ==
Champion Sound track listing
No.	Title	Writer(s)	Length
1.	"Forever Free"	Rollo Armstrong; Ayalah Bentovim	1:35
2.	"In Your Own Groove" (featuring LSK)	Armstrong; Bentovim; Max Rad	4:53
3.	"Fugitive"	Armstrong; Bentovim; Rad	7:24
4.	"Peace and Noise" (featuring Suli Breaks)	Armstrong; Bentovim; Suli Breaks	3:01
5.	"Meeting" (featuring Nathan Ball and Amelia Fox)	Armstrong	5:30
6.	"Driving" (featuring Nathan Ball, Amelia Fox, Suli Breaks, and Max Rad)	Armstrong; Rad	3:51
7.	"Thinking" (featuring Nathan Ball and Amelia Fox)	Armstrong	8:18
8.	"Book of Hours"	Armstrong; Bentovim	24:06
9.	"Find a Way" (featuring Suli Breaks)	Armstrong; Bentovim; Suli Breaks	3:02
10.	"Dollars and Dimes" (featuring Bebe Rexha)	Armstrong; Bentovim	2:49
11.	"Champion Sound" (featuring LSK)	Armstrong	2:31
12.	"Emmanuel" (featuring Emmanuel Jal)	Armstrong; Emmanuel Jal	4:28
13.	"Yes I Want It Too" (featuring Antony Szmierek)	Armstrong; Antony Szmierek	4:18
Total length:			75:46

== Personnel ==
Credits adapted from the album's liner notes.

=== Faithless ===
- Rollo – production (all tracks); programming, drum programming, mixing (tracks 1–5, 7–13)
- Sister Bliss – keyboards, piano, bass, strings, production (all tracks); programming, drum programming (1–5, 7–13)

=== Additional contributors ===
- Maxi Jazz – vocals (1)
- Max Rad – guitar (2, 3, 12); keyboards, bass, drums, production, mixing (6)
- Lily Gonzalez – backing vocals (2, 3), percussion (12)
- LSK – vocals (2, 11)
- Suli Breaks – vocals (4, 9), vocal sample (6)
- Amelia Fox – vocals (5–7), backing vocals (13)
- Nathan Ball – vocals (5–7)
- Ed Raison – guitar (7)
- Bebe Rexha – vocals (10), backing vocals (11)
- Emmanuel Jal – vocals (12)
- Nyaneng – backing vocals (12)
- Jem Haynes – additional mixing (12)
- Antony Szmierek – vocals (13)
- Mike Lythgoe – design
- Ollie Trenchard – photography

== Charts ==
Chart performance for Champion Sound
Chart (2025)	Peak position
Belgian Albums (Ultratop Flanders)	191
Belgian Albums (Ultratop Wallonia)	122
Scottish Albums (Official Charts)	8
UK Albums (Official Charts)	15
UK Dance Albums (Official Charts)	1
UK Independent Albums (Official Charts)	5
