= Rave Immortal =

2025 album by Alt Blk Era

Studio album by Alt Blk Era
- Released: 24 January 2025
- Genres: Alternative, drum & bass, rock, EDM
- Length: 31:35
- Label: Earache Records

Alt Blk Era chronology
Freak Show (2023)	Rave Immortal (2025)

Rave Immortal is the debut studio album from British electronic rock duo Alt Blk Era. It was released on 24 January 2025 via independent label Earache Records. It was preceded by the singles "My Drummer's Girlfriend", "Straight to Heart", "Come On Outside", "Hunt You Down", and "Run, Rabbit".

== Background ==
The album was announced on June 26, 2024, alongside the lead single "My Drummer's Girlfriend". Four more singles, "Straight to Heart", "Come On Outside", "Hunt You Down" and "Run, Rabbit" were released preceding the album's release, as well as an alternative version of "My Drummer's Girlfriend" featuring Wheatus.

Alt Blk Era stated the album was written when they were teenagers, and that they wanted the album to be a mature project. It touches on their experiences growing up, and Nyrobi's struggles with chronic fatigue syndrome.

Initially set to release on 10 January, the album released on 24 January 2025. They embarked on a headline tour for the album in April, playing in 7 locations across England.

== Track listing ==
All tracks written by Nyrobi Beckett-Messam and Chaya Beckett-Messam. All tracks produced by Nyrobi Beckett-Messam, Chaya Beckett-Messsam, Charlie Russell, and Natt Webb.

No.	Title	Length
1.	"Straight to Heart"	2:54
2.	"Come On Outside"	2:59
3.	"Crashing Parties"	2:50
4.	"My Drummer's Girlfriend"	2:37
5.	"Hunt You Down"	2:49
6.	"Upstairs Neighbours"	3:36
7.	"Come Fight Me for It"	3:41
8.	"Run Rabbit"	3:07
9.	"Catch Me If You Can"	3:54
10.	"Rave Immortal"	3:09
Total length:		31:35

== Charts ==
Chart	Peak position
Irish Albums (IRMA)	2
Scottish Albums (Official Charts)	41
UK Albums (Official Charts)	82
UK Album Downloads (Official Charts)	5
UK Independent Albums (Official Charts)	6
UK Rock & Metal Albums (Official Charts)	1
