= Alt Blk Era =

British rock band

- Nyrobi (left) and Chaya (right) of Alt Blk Era in 2026

Background information
- Origin: Nottingham, England
- Genres: Rock; electronic; alt-pop; drum 'n' bass
- Years active: 2022–present
- Labels: Earache; LAB
- Members: Nyrobi Beckett-Messam; Chaya Beckett-Messam
- Website: altblkera.com

Alt Blk Era (stylized in all caps) are a British rock duo from Nottingham, debuting in 2022. It consists of sisters Nyrobi and Chaya Becket-Messam. They released their EP Freak Show in 2023 and their debut album, Rave Immortal, in 2025, both via Earache Records.

== History ==
In 2020, the sisters began uploading cover versions of songs to YouTube under the name Nyrxbi & Chxy. Around this time, the pair also completed online courses by the youth organization Inspire Youth Arts, which included a course in songwriting.

Their debut single, "Slowly Die: Solar", was released independently on 4 February 2022. This was followed by their debut EP Freak Show, which came out on 1 September 2023. Later that year, they featured on Delilah Bon’s single "Witch".

In 2024, Alt Blk Era were chosen by Tom Morello to open for him at a sold-out show at London's Electric Ballroom.

The same year, they were nominated for Best UK Breakthrough Act at the Heavy Music Awards and Best Alternative Music Act at the MOBOs.

They have performed at the Download Festival, Reading and Leeds, Glastonbury Festival, 2000trees and Boomtown.

Alt Blk Era's debut album, Rave Immortal, was released on 24 January 2025. It was preceded by the singles "My Drummer’s Girlfriend", "Straight To Heart", "Come On Outside" and "Hunt You Down". Later, they released a new version of "My Drummer’s Girlfriend" with a guest feature from Wheatus. The album charted at number 1 on the Official UK Rock and Metal Albums Chart and number 82 on the Official UK Albums Chart.

In 2025, they won the MOBO Award for Best Alternative Music Act. They supported Pendulum on their Inertia Tour later that year. At the end of 2025, they announced their second EP Our World, set to be released on 22 May 2026. A UK headline tour was also announced to coincide with the release.

== Musical style and influences ==
Alt Blk Era primarily mix rock music with genres such as dance, pop and drum and bass.

== Members ==
- Nyrobi Beckett-Messam – vocals, songwriting, production
- Chaya Beckett-Messam – vocals, songwriting, production

Touring members

- Alex Plant – guitar
- Sam Brooks – drums

== Discography ==
=== Studio albums ===
List of studio albums, with selected details and chart positions
Title	Details	Peak chart positions		
Title	Details	UK	UK Rock	SCO
Rave Immortal	Released: 24 January 2025; Label: Earache Records; Formats: CD, LP, digital download, streaming	82	1	41

=== Extended plays ===
List of studio albums, with selected details and chart positions
Title	Details	Peak chart positions
Title	Details	UK Rock
Freak Show	Released: 1 September 2023; Label: Self-released; Formats: digital download, streaming	—
Our World	Released: 22 May 2026; Label: LAB Records; Formats: CD, LP, digital download, streaming	30

=== Singles ===
Title	Year	Album
"Slowly Die: Solar"	2022	Non-album singles
"Slowly Die: Lunar"	2022	Non-album singles
"Even If We're Not: Solar"	2022	Non-album singles
"Even If We're Not: Lunar"	2022	Non-album singles
"Obsession: Solar"	2022	Non-album singles
"Rockstar"	2022	Non-album singles
"Mosh Girl Summer"	2022	Non-album singles
"Obsession: Lunar"	2022	Non-album singles
"Off with Their Heads"	2022	Non-album singles
"Rockstar: Lunar"	2023	Non-album singles
"I'm Normally Like This"	2023	Freak Show
"Misfits: Solar"	2023	Freak Show
"My Drummer's Girlfriend"	2024	Rave Immortal
"Straight to Heart"	2024	Rave Immortal
"Come On Outside"	2024	Rave Immortal
"My Drummer's Girlfriend" featuring Wheatus	2024	Non-album single
"Hunt You Down"	2024	Rave Immortal
"Run Rabbit"	2025	Rave Immortal
"Okay (Cyber Racing)"	2025	Our World
"Tissues"	2026	Our World
"Lost in the Back of My Mind"	2026	Our World
"Silhouettes in the Mirror"	2026	Our World
"Okay! Okay!" with Novel Core	2026	Non-album single

=== Guest appearances ===
Title	Year	Main artists
"Witch"	2023	Delilah Bon
"Armageddon (Alt Edition)	2025	Sola Guinto, Faffi

== Awards and nominations ==
Heavy Music Awards
Year	Nominee / work	Award	Result	Ref.
2024	Themselves	Best UK Breakthrough Live Artist	Nominated	
2025	Themselves	Best Breakthrough Live Artist	Nominated	

MOBO Awards
Year	Nominee / work	Award	Result	Ref.
2023	Themselves	Best Alternative Music Act	Nominated	
2024	Themselves	Best Alternative Music Act	Nominated	
2025	Themselves	Best Alternative Music Act	Won	
2026	Themselves	Best Alternative Music Act	Nominated	
