= Service Station at the End of the Universe =

Studio album by Antony Szmierek
- Released: 28 February 2025
- Length: 36:37
- Label: Mushroom Music

Singles from Service Station at the End of the Universe
- 1. "The Hitchhiker's Guide to the Fallacy" Released: 21 March 2022; 2. "Rafters" Released: 25 July 2024; 3. "The Great Pyramid of Stockport" Released: 3 October 2024; 4. "Yoga Teacher" Released: 21 November 2024; 5. "Angie's Wedding" Released: 22 January 2025

Service Station at the End of the Universe is the debut studio album by the English musician Antony Szmierek.

== Background ==
In 2023, Antony Szmierek released his debut EP titled Poems to Dance To. The release of the EP led to Szmierek winning the BBC Radio 6 Music's Artist of the Year. Following his award, Szmierek quit teaching to pursue music full time, which led to him recording and releasing the album. Szmierek recalled first hearing the seventh track, "The Hitchhiker's Guide to the Fallacy" and saying: "Oh fuck, this is so good." which led to him making the album.

== Release and reception ==
Professional ratings
Aggregate scores
Source	Rating
AnyDecentMusic?	8.2/10
Metacritic	89/100
Review scores
Source	Rating
Clash	8/10
DIY Magazine	5/5 stars
Dork	5/5
NME	4/5 stars

Service Station at the End of the Universe was released on 28 February 2025 to positive reviews from sources such as the British magazine Clash, who stated that it "strives for connection and thrives on immediacy" and that "There's a warmth to the record that is undeniable, hinging on the sense of character in those words." The album was preceded by 5 singles: The Hitchhiker's Guide to the Fallacy, Rafters, The Great Pyramid of Stockport, Yoga Teacher, and Angie's Wedding.

== Track listing ==
No.	Title	Writer(s)	Length
1.	"Service Station at the End of the Universe"	Antony Szmierek, Max Rad	3:08
2.	"Rafters"	Y'ves Jones, Rad, Szmierek	3:07
3.	"The Great Pyramid of Stockport"	Robin Parker, Rad, Szmierek	2:36
4.	"Big Light"	Parker, Szmierek	3:24
5.	"Yoga Teacher"	Luis Navidad, Szmierek	3:02
6.	"Crumb"	Navidad, Szmierek	3:13
7.	"The Hitchhiker's Guide to the Fallacy"	Parker, Szmierek	2:55
8.	"passingthru (featuring Kate Ireland)"	Kate Ireland, Szmierek	0:59
9.	"Take Me There"	Parker, Rad, Szmierek	3:32
10.	"Restless Leg Syndrome"	Rad, Szmierek	3:07
11.	"Crashing Up"	Navidad, Parker, Szmierek	3:48
12.	"Angie's Wedding"	Rad, Szmierek	3:55
Total length:			36:37
