= List of UK Dance Singles Chart number ones of 2025 =

The UK Dance Singles Chart is a weekly music chart compiled in the United Kingdom by the Official Charts Company (OCC) from sales of songs in the dance music genre (house, drum and bass, dubstep, etc.) in record stores and digital downloads. The chart week runs from Friday to Thursday with the chart-date given as the following Thursday.

This is a list of the songs which were number one on the UK Dance Singles Chart during 2025.

== Chart history ==
| Chart date (week ending) | Song | Artist(s) | References |
|---|---|---|---|
| 2 January | "The Days" | Chrystal | |
| 9 January | "The Days" | Chrystal | |
| 16 January | "The Days" | Chrystal | |
| 23 January | "The Days" | Chrystal | |
| 30 January | "The Days" | Chrystal | |
| 6 February | "The Days" | Chrystal | |
| 13 February | "The Days" | Chrystal | |
| 20 February | "The Days" | Chrystal | |
| 27 February | "The Days" | Chrystal | |
| 6 March | "The Days" | Chrystal | |
| 13 March | "The Days" | Chrystal | |
| 20 March | "The Days" | Chrystal | |
| 27 March | "The Days" | Chrystal | |
| 3 April | "The Days" | Chrystal | |
| 10 April | "The Days" | Chrystal | |
| 17 April | "The Days" | Chrystal | |
| 24 April | "The Days" | Chrystal | |
| 1 May | "The Days" | Chrystal | |
| 8 May | "The Days" | Chrystal | |
| 15 May | "The Days" | Chrystal | |
| 22 May | "The Days" | Chrystal | |
| 29 May | "Blessings" | Calvin Harris featuring Clementine Douglas | |
| 5 June | "Blessings" | Calvin Harris featuring Clementine Douglas | |
| 12 June | "Blessings" | Calvin Harris featuring Clementine Douglas | |
| 19 June | "Blessings" | Calvin Harris featuring Clementine Douglas | |
| 26 June | "Dior" | MK featuring Chrystal | |
| 3 July | "Dior" | MK featuring Chrystal | |
| 10 July | "Dior" | MK featuring Chrystal | |
| 17 July ^{[a]} | "Dior" | MK featuring Chrystal | |
| 24 July ^{[a]} | "Dior" | MK featuring Chrystal | |
| 31 July | "Dior" | MK featuring Chrystal | |
| 7 August | "Dior" | MK featuring Chrystal | |
| 14 August | "Dior" | MK featuring Chrystal | |
| 21 August | "No Broke Boys" | Disco Lines and Tinashe | |
| 28 August | "No Broke Boys" | Disco Lines and Tinashe | |
| 4 September | "No Broke Boys" | Disco Lines and Tinashe | |
| 11 September | "No Broke Boys" | Disco Lines and Tinashe | |
| 18 September | "No Broke Boys" | Disco Lines and Tinashe | |
| 25 September | "No Broke Boys" | Disco Lines and Tinashe | |
| 2 October | "No Broke Boys" | Disco Lines and Tinashe | |
| 9 October | "No Broke Boys" | Disco Lines and Tinashe | |
| 16 October | "No Broke Boys" | Disco Lines and Tinashe | |
| 23 October | "No Broke Boys" | Disco Lines and Tinashe | |
| 30 October | "No Broke Boys" | Disco Lines and Tinashe | |
| 6 November | "No Broke Boys" | Disco Lines and Tinashe | |
| 13 November | "No Broke Boys" | Disco Lines and Tinashe | |
| 20 November | "No Broke Boys" | Disco Lines and Tinashe | |
| 27 November | "No Broke Boys" | Disco Lines and Tinashe | |
| 4 December | "No Broke Boys" | Disco Lines and Tinashe | |
| 11 December | "No Broke Boys" | Disco Lines and Tinashe | |
| 18 December | "I Run" | Haven featuring Kaitlin Aragon | |
| 25 December | "I Run" | Haven featuring Kaitlin Aragon | |

- ^{a} – the single was simultaneously number-one on the singles chart.

== Number-one artists ==
| Position | Artist | Weeks at number one |
|---|---|---|
| 1 | Chrystal (8 weeks as featuring) | 29 |
| 2 | Disco Lines | 17 |
| 2 | Tinashe | 17 |
| 3 | MK | 8 |
| 4 | Calvin Harris | 4 |
| 4 | Clementine Douglas (as featuring) | 4 |
| 5 | Haven | 2 |
| 5 | Kaitlin Aragon (as featuring) | 2 |

== See also ==
- List of number-one singles of 2025 (UK)
- List of UK Dance Albums Chart number ones of 2025
- List of UK R&B Singles Chart number ones of 2025
- List of UK Rock & Metal Singles Chart number ones of 2025
- List of UK Independent Singles Chart number ones of 2025
