= Rianne Downey =

Scottish singer-songwriter (born 1999)

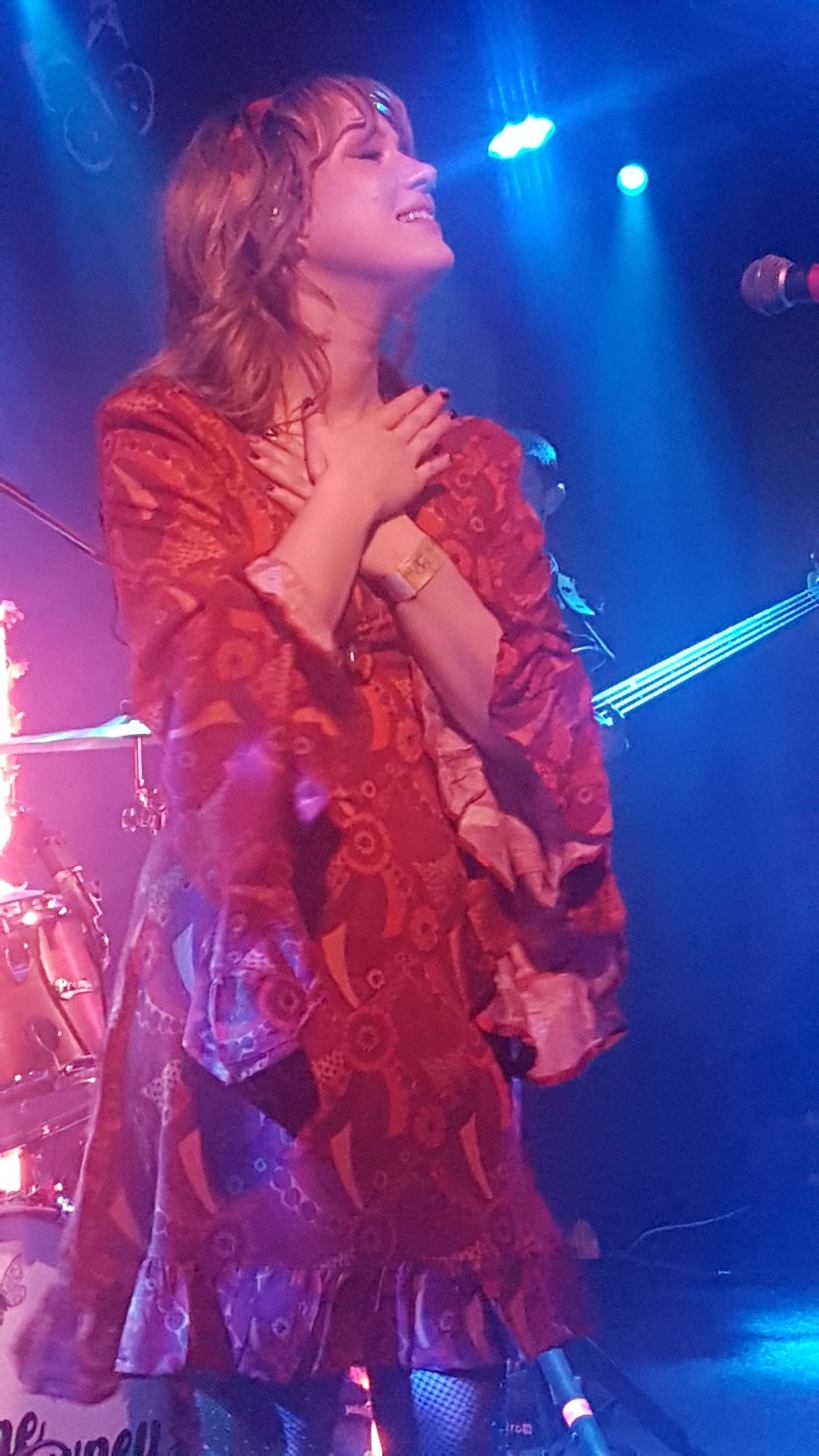
- Downey performing live in December 2023

Background information
- Born: 21 February 1999 (age 27); Bellshill, North Lanarkshire, Scotland
- Genres: Country; folk-pop
- Occupations: Musician; singer-songwriter
- Instruments: Vocals; guitar; harmonia; pedal steel
- Years active: 2020–present
- Label: Run On Records
- Website: Official website

Rianne Downey (born 21 February 1999) is a Scottish singer-songwriter.

== Career ==
Downey was awarded the James McAvoy scholarship for the Royal Conservatoire in Glasgow when aged 16. She pursued a solo career by busking on the streets of Glasgow.

Downey's debut single, "Fuel to the Flame", was released in February 2021 and received more than 3,000 streams on the first day.

In 2023, Downey replaced Jacqui Abbott, who, due to a health scare, withdrew from a Neighbourhood Weekender festival concert in Warrington with Paul Heaton .They also played Glastonbury together. Heaton and Downey continued to work together on Heaton's subsequent 2023 UK tour, including performing on the main stage at TRNSMT and Scarborough Open Air Theatre.

In 2025 and 2026 she performed again at TRNSMT, with a mixture of her own songs and classics such as "Wild Mountain Thyme" and "Rotterdam (Or Anywhere)". Also in 2025 she performed with Paul Heaton in an outdoor concert held at Bramall Lane football stadium, Sheffield,. The duo have other appearances together scheduled.She is also currently back on tour with Paul Heaton across the UK and Ireland.

== Discography ==
=== Studio albums ===
Title	Details	Peak chart positions			
Title	Details	SCO	UK	UK Country	UK Americana
The Consequence of Love	Released: October 17, 2025; Label: Run On Records; Formats: CD, LP, digital download, streaming	3	18	1	1
