= List of UK R&B Singles Chart number ones of 2025 =

The logo of the Official Charts Company, responsible for compiling all of the official music charts in the United Kingdom, including the R&B singles chart.

The UK R&B Singles Chart is a weekly chart that ranks the 40 biggest-selling singles and albums that are classified in the R&B genre in the United Kingdom. The chart is compiled by the Official Charts Company, and is based on both physical, and digital sales.

The following are the songs which have topped the UK R&B Singles Chart in 2025.

== Number-one singles ==
Chart date (week ending)	Song	Artist(s)	Record label	References
2 January	"Timeless"	The Weeknd and Playboi Carti	Republic/XO	
9 January	"Timeless"	The Weeknd and Playboi Carti	Republic/XO	
16 January	"Timeless"	The Weeknd and Playboi Carti	Republic/XO	
23 January	"Timeless"	The Weeknd and Playboi Carti	Republic/XO	
30 January	"GBP"	Central Cee featuring 21 Savage	Columbia	
6 February ^{[b]}	"CRG"	Central Cee and Dave	Columbia	
13 February ^{[b]}	"Timeless"	The Weeknd and Playboi Carti	Republic/XO	
20 February ^{[b]}	"Not Like Us"	Kendrick Lamar	Interscope	
27 February ^{[a]}	"Not Like Us"	Kendrick Lamar	Interscope	
6 March ^{[a]} ^{[b]}	"Not Like Us"	Kendrick Lamar	Interscope	
13 March ^{[b]}	"Not Like Us"	Kendrick Lamar	Interscope	
20 March	"Not Like Us"	Kendrick Lamar	Interscope	
27 March	"Evil J0rdan"	Playboi Carti	Interscope	
3 April	"Not Like Us"	Kendrick Lamar	Interscope	
10 April	"Nokia"	Drake	OVO/Republic	
17 April	"Nokia"	Drake	OVO/Republic	
24 April	"Nokia"	Drake	OVO/Republic	
1 May	"Mutt"	Leon Thomas	EMI	
8 May	"Nokia"	Drake	OVO/Republic	
15 May	"Nokia"	Drake	OVO/Republic	
22 May	"Shake It to the Max (Fly)"	Moliy and Silent Addy	Gamma	
29 May	"Family Matters"	Skye Newman	Columbia	
5 June	"Family Matters"	Skye Newman	Columbia	
12 June	"Family Matters"	Skye Newman	Columbia	
19 June	"Family Matters"	Skye Newman	Columbia	
26 June	"Family Matters"	Skye Newman	Columbia	
3 July	"Victory Lap"	Fred Again, PlaqueBoyMax and Skepta	Atlantic/Big Smoke/Epic	
10 July	"Victory Lap"	Fred Again, PlaqueBoyMax and Skepta	Atlantic/Big Smoke/Epic	
17 July	"Victory Lap"	Fred Again, PlaqueBoyMax and Skepta	Atlantic/Big Smoke/Epic	
24 July	"Victory Lap"	Fred Again, PlaqueBoyMax and Skepta	Atlantic/Big Smoke/Epic	
31 July	"Victory Lap"	Fred Again, PlaqueBoyMax and Skepta	Atlantic/Big Smoke/Epic	
7 August	"Which One"	Drake and Central Cee	Columbia/OVO/Republic	
14 August	"Which One"	Drake and Central Cee	Columbia/OVO/Republic	
21 August	"Victory Lap"	Fred Again, PlaqueBoyMax and Skepta	Atlantic/Big Smoke/Epic	
28 August	"Victory Lap"	Fred Again, PlaqueBoyMax and Skepta	Atlantic/Big Smoke/Epic	
4 September	"Victory Lap"	Fred Again, PlaqueBoyMax and Skepta	Atlantic/Big Smoke/Epic	
11 September	"Victory Lap"	Fred Again, PlaqueBoyMax and Skepta	Atlantic/Big Smoke/Epic	
18 September	"Victory Lap"	Fred Again, PlaqueBoyMax and Skepta	Atlantic/Big Smoke/Epic	
25 September	"Victory Lap"	Fred Again, PlaqueBoyMax and Skepta	Atlantic/Big Smoke/Epic	
2 October	"Victory Lap"	Fred Again, PlaqueBoyMax and Skepta	Atlantic/Big Smoke/Epic	
9 October	"Victory Lap"	Fred Again, PlaqueBoyMax and Skepta	Atlantic/Big Smoke/Epic	
16 October	"Victory Lap"	Fred Again, PlaqueBoyMax and Skepta	Atlantic/Big Smoke/Epic	
23 October	"Victory Lap"	Fred Again, PlaqueBoyMax and Skepta	Atlantic/Big Smoke/Epic	
30 October	"Victory Lap"	Fred Again, PlaqueBoyMax and Skepta	Atlantic/Big Smoke/Epic	
6 November	"Raindance"	Dave and Tems	Neighbourhood	
13 November	"Raindance"	Dave and Tems	Neighbourhood	
20 November	"Raindance"	Dave and Tems	Neighbourhood	
27 November	"Raindance"	Dave and Tems	Neighbourhood	
4 December	"Raindance"	Dave and Tems	Neighbourhood	
11 December	"Raindance"	Dave and Tems	Neighbourhood	
18 December	"Raindance"	Dave and Tems	Neighbourhood	
25 December	"Raindance"	Dave and Tems	Neighbourhood	

== Notes ==
- ^{a} - The single was simultaneously number one on the UK Singles Chart.
- ^{b} - The artist was simultaneously number one on the R&B Albums Chart.

== See also ==
- List of UK Singles Chart number ones of 2025
- List of UK R&B Albums Chart number ones of 2025
- List of UK Dance Singles Chart number ones of 2025
