= The Consequence of Love =

Studio album by Rianne Downey
- Released: 17 October 2025
- Studio: Bear Creek
- Genre: Country pop
- Length: 30:56
- Label: Run On; Modern Sky UK
- Producer: Ryan Hadlock

The Consequence of Love is the debut studio album by Scottish singer-songwriter Rianne Downey, released on 17 October 2025, via Run On Records in association with Modern Sky UK.

== Background ==
Downey began crafting the album following a breakout year in 2024, which included touring with Paul Heaton and a performance on the Pyramid Stage at Glastonbury Festival 2024. The album was recorded at Bear Creek Studio in Seattle and produced by Ryan Hadlock. All ten tracks were written by Downey, with contributions from longtime collaborator Nathaniel Laurence. Downey described the album as a culmination of her journey from busking on the streets of Glasgow to becoming a recording artist, saying "It almost feels like my whole life has led to this moment.”

== Track listing ==
All tracks are written by Rianne Downey; "The Song of Old Glencoe", "Lost in Blue", "Sunblind", and "Blue Eyes Burnin'" written with Nathaniel Cummings.

The Consequence of Love track listing
No.	Title	Length
1.	"Good in Goodbye"	2:36
2.	"The Song of Old Glencoe"	2:48
3.	"The Consequence of Love"	3:47
4.	"Lost in Blue"	3:29
5.	"Angel"	3:10
6.	"Sunblind"	3:10
7.	"Because"	3:03
8.	"Nothing Better"	2:44
9.	"Blue Eyes Burnin'"	2:21
10.	"Heart of Mine"	3:48
Total length:		30:56

== Personnel ==
Credits adapted from Tidal.

- Rianne Downey – vocals, acoustic guitar
- Ryan Hadlock – production, mixing (all tracks); synthesizer (track 2), percussion (3)
- Taylor James Carroll – mixing (all tracks); drums, percussion (1–4, 6–10)
- Gavin Lurssen – mastering
- Dune Butler – bass guitar (all tracks), synthesizer (3, 7–9), Mellotron (3); mandolin, vibraphone (8); Moog bass (10)
- Jeff Fielder – Dobro guitar (1, 5), mandolin (1), electric guitar (4, 10), slide guitar (4)
- Brian Eichelberger – viola, violin (2, 10); fiddle (6)
- Charles Wicklander – piano (2, 8), synthesizer (2), Hammond organ (10)
- Johnny Sangster – baritone guitar (3), electric guitar (6, 7, 9)
- Nathaniel Cummings – 12-string acoustic guitar (3, 8, 9)

== Charts ==
Chart performance for The Consequence Of Love
Chart (2025)	Peak position
Scottish Albums (OCC)	3
UK Albums (OCC)	18
UK Americana Albums (OCC)	1
UK Country Albums (OCC)	1
UK Independent Albums (OCC)	2
