= List of UK R&B Albums Chart number ones of 2025 =

The logo of the Official Charts Company, responsible for compiling all of the official music charts in the United Kingdom, including the R&B albums chart.

The UK R&B Albums Chart is a weekly chart, first introduced in October 1994, that ranks the 40 biggest-selling albums that are classified in the R&B genre in the United Kingdom. The chart is compiled by the Official Charts Company, and is based on sales of CDs, downloads, vinyl and other formats over the previous seven days.

The following are the number-one albums of 2025

== Number-one albums ==
Issue date	Album	Artist(s)	Record label	Ref.
3 January	Back to Black	Amy Winehouse	Island	
10 January	Back to Black	Amy Winehouse	Island	
17 January	Back to Black	Amy Winehouse	Island	
24 January	Balloonerism	Mac Miller	Warner	
31 January ^{[a]} ^{[b]}	Can't Rush Greatness	Central Cee	Columbia	
7 February ^{[a]} ^{[b]}	Hurry Up Tomorrow	The Weeknd	Republic/XO	
14 February ^{[b]}	GNX	Kendrick Lamar	Interscope	
21 February	Can't Rush Greatness	Central Cee	Columbia	
28 February ^{[b]}	GNX	Kendrick Lamar	Interscope	
7 March ^{[b]}	GNX	Kendrick Lamar	Interscope	
14 March	Clear Lake Audiotorium	De La Soul	Chrysalis	
21 March	GNX	Kendrick Lamar	Interscope	
28 March	Tell Dem It's Sunny	Greentea Peng	Greentea Peng	
4 April	Rents Due	Nemzzz	Nemzzz	
11 April	Igor	Tyler, the Creator	Columbia	
18 April	The Low End Theory	A Tribe Called Quest	Jive	
25 April	Alligator Bites Never Heal	Doechii	Capitol	
2 May	Alligator Bites Never Heal	Doechii	Capitol	
9 May	Igor	Tyler, the Creator	Columbia	
16 May	Hurry Up Tomorrow	The Weeknd	Republic/XO	
23 May	Igor	Tyler, the Creator	Columbia	
30 May	Igor	Tyler, the Creator	Columbia	
6 June	To Pimp a Butterfly	Kendrick Lamar	Interscope	
13 June	Lotus	Little Simz	AWAL	
20 June	Don't Die Before You're Dead	AJ Tracey	Revenge Records	
27 June	Hopefully!	Loyle Carner	EMI	
4 July	Humble as the Sun	Bob Vylan	Ghost Theatre	
11 July	Self Titled	Kae Tempest	Island	
18 July	No Sign of Weakness	Burna Boy	Atlantic	
25 July	Don't Tap the Glass	Tyler, the Creator	Columbia	
1 August	Alfredo 2	Freddie Gibbs and the Alchemist	ESGN	
8 August	Igor	Tyler, the Creator	Columbia	
15 August	Igor	Tyler, the Creator	Columbia	
22 August	Perfect Timing	Asco	Mulli Music Group	
29 August	Cherry Bomb	Tyler, the Creator	Columbia	
5 September	Beauty Behind the Madness	The Weeknd	Republic/XO	
12 September	Different Times	Mazza L20	EMI	
19 September	Igor	Tyler, the Creator	Columbia	
26 September	Don't Look Down	Kojey Radical	Atlantic	
3 October	Here for It All	Mariah Carey	Gamma	
10 October	Live in Places (2006-2014)	Dan le Sac Vs Scroobius Pip	Speech Development	
17 October	Back to Black	Amy Winehouse	Island	
24 October	Back to Black	Amy Winehouse	Island	
31 October ^{[a]} ^{[b]}	The Boy Who Played the Harp	Dave	Neighbourhood	
7 November	Chromakopia	Tyler, the Creator	Columbia	
14 November	Chromakopia	Tyler, the Creator	Columbia	
21 November	PTSD 2	D-Block Europe	D-Block Europe	
28 November	Chromakopia	Tyler, the Creator	Columbia	
5 December	Back to Black	Amy Winehouse	Island	
12 December	Back to Black	Amy Winehouse	Island	
19 December	Back to Black	Amy Winehouse	Island	
26 December	Back to Black	Amy Winehouse	Island	

== Notes ==
- ^{a} - The album was simultaneously number-one on the UK Albums Chart.
- ^{b} - The artist was simultaneously number-one on the R&B Singles Chart.

== See also ==
- List of UK Albums Chart number ones of the 2020s
- List of UK R&B Singles Chart number ones of 2025
