= List of UK Independent Albums Chart number ones of 2025 =

These are the Official Charts Company's UK Independent Albums Chart number ones of 2025.

== Chart history ==
Issue date	Album	Artist(s)	Record label	Ref.
3 January	Romance	Fontaines D.C.	XL	
10 January	Romance	Fontaines D.C.	XL	
17 January	The Human Fear	Franz Ferdinand	Domino	
24 January	Dear Life	David Gray	Laugh a Minute	
31 January	Eusexua	FKA Twigs	Young	
7 February	Restoration	Røry	Late	
14 February	The Promised Land	Block 33	Stone Beach Modernist Club	
21 February	Oh! The Ocean	The Wombats	The Wombats	
28 February	Blindness	The Murder Capital	Human Season	
7 March	Matter Does Not Define	The Lathums	Modern Sky	
14 March	Tsunami Sea	Spiritbox	Rise	
21 March	The Overview	Steven Wilson	Fiction	
28 March ^{[a]}	KOKO	The Lottery Winners	Modern Sky	
4 April	Dreams on Toast	The Darkness	Cooking Vinyl	
11 April	Forever Howlong	Black Country, New Road	Ninja Tune	
18 April ^{[a]}	God Shaped Hole	Those Damn Crows	Earache	
25 April	There Is No Space for Us	Hawkwind	Cherry Red	
2 May	Glasgow Love Story	Tide Lines	Tide Lines Music	
9 May	Ten Crowns	Andy Bell	Crowns Recordings	
16 May	Never/Know	The Kooks	Lonely Cat	
23 May	Everything Must Make Sense	The Sherlocks	Infectious	
30 May	Mad!	Sparks	Transgressive	
6 June	Let All That We Imagine Be the Light	Garbage	BMG	
13 June ^{[a]}	More	Pulp	Rough Trade	
20 June ^{[a]}	Don't Tell the Dog	James Marriott	AWAL	
27 June	4	Aitch	Infinitum	
4 July	More	Pulp	Rough Trade	
11 July	National Average	Big Special	So Recordings	
18 July ^{[a]}	Moisturizer	Wet Leg	Domino	
25 July	Romance	Fontaines D.C.	XL	
1 August	Pretty on the Internet	The K's	LAB	
8 August	The New Eve is Rising	New Eves	Transgressive	
15 August	Songs for the Spine	Royston Club	Modern Sky/ Run On	
22 August	Everything's on Fire but I'm Fine	As December Falls	ADF	
29 August	A Matter of Time	Laufey	Vingolf	
5 September	Euro-Country	CMAT	CMAT Baby/AWAL	
12 September	Antidepressants	Suede	BMG	
19 September	Comfort in Sound	Feeder	Echo	
26 September	Rainy Sunday Afternoon	The Divine Comedy	The Divine Comedy	
3 October	Surfing on Sine Waves	Polygon Window	Warp	
10 October	Fight Another Day	James Morrison	Cooking Vinyl	
17 October	Lovin' You	Richard Ashcroft	Richard Ashcroft/RPA	
24 October	Heartland	Sam Ryder	Artist Theory	
31 October	Victim of a Casual Thing	Clause	The Clause	
7 November	We Are Love	The Charlatans	BMG	
14 November	Ego Death at a Bachelorette Party	Hayley Williams	Post Atlantic	
21 November	PTSD 2	D-Block Europe	D-Block Europe	
28 November	Knees Up	Olly Murs	BMG	
5 December	Hit Parade	Madness	West Village Music	
12 December	Roll the Dice	The Reytons	The Reytons	
19 December	(What's The Story) Morning Glory Singles	Oasis	Big Brother	
26 December	Getting Killed	Geese	Partisan/Play It Again Sam	

== Notes ==
- ^{a} – The single was simultaneously number-one on the Album chart.
- ^{b} - The artist was simultaneously number one on the Independent Singles Chart.
