= List of UK Rock & Metal Albums Chart number ones of 2025 =

The UK Rock & Metal Albums Chart is a record chart which ranks the best-selling rock and heavy metal albums in the United Kingdom. Compiled and published by the Official Charts Company, the data is based on each album's weekly physical sales and digital downloads.

== Chart history ==
Issue date	Album	Artist(s)	Record label(s)	Ref.
3 January	From Zero	Linkin Park	Warner	
10 January	From Zero	Linkin Park	Warner	
17 January	Who Let the Dogs Out	Lambrini Girls	City Slang	
24 January	Live Magic at Trading Boundaries	Steve Hackett	Inside Out Music	
31 January	Rave Immortal	Alt Blk Era	Earache	
7 February	Restoration	Røry	Late	
14 February	Parasomnia	Dream Theater	Inside Out	
21 February	All Hands on Deck	Punk Rock Factory	Cooking Vinyl	
28 February	This Consequence	Killswitch Engage	Metal Blade	
7 March	The Sky, the Earth & All Between	Architects	Epitaph	
14 March	Curious Ruminant	Jethro Tull	Inside Out	
21 March	The Overview	Steven Wilson	Fiction	
28 March	The Screaming of the Valkyries	Cradle of Filth	Napalm	
4 April	Dreams on Toast	The Darkness	Cooking Vinyl	
11 April	Black Light/White Noise	Smith/Kotzen	BMG	
18 April	God Shaped Hole	Those Damn Crows	Earache	
25 April	There Is No Space for Us	Hawkwind	Cherry Red	
2 May	Skeletá	Ghost	Loma Vista	
9 May	Pink Floyd at Pompeii – MCMLXXII	Pink Floyd	Sony	
16 May	Even in Arcadia	Sleep Token	RCA	
23 May	Will You Haunt Me, with That Same Patience	Bury Tomorrow	Music for Nations	
30 May	Saviors	Green Day	Reprise	
6 June	Pink Floyd at Pompeii – MCMLXXII	Pink Floyd	Sony	
13 June	Three Cheers for Sweet Revenge	My Chemical Romance	Reprise	
20 June	Load	Metallica	Elektra	
27 June	Where Only the Truth Is Spoken	Malevolence	Nuclear Blast	
4 July	The Manticore Tapes	Motörhead	BMG	
11 July	Never Enough	Turnstile	Road Runner	
18 July	The Lamb Stands Up Live at the Royal Albert Hall	Steve Hackett	Inside Out Music	
25 July	Panic Shack	Panic Shack	Brace Yourself	
1 August	The Revenge of Alice Cooper	Alice Cooper	EarMusic	
8 August	Roger Waters: This Is Not a Drill – Live from Prague	Roger Waters	Columbia, Legacy	
15 August	Everest	Halestorm	Atlantic	
22 August	Everything's on Fire but I'm Fine	As December Falls	ADF	
29 August	Private Music	Deftones	Reprise	
5 September	Parasites & Butterflies	Nova Twins	Marshall	
12 September	Slipknot	Slipknot	Road Runner	
19 September	I Feel the Everblack Festering Within Me	Lorna Shore	Century Media	
26 September	Futique	Biffy Clyro	Warner	
3 October	The Lamb Lies Down on Broadway	Genesis	Charisma	
10 October	Death Above Life	Orbit Culture	Century Media	
17 October	Para Bellum	Testament	Nuclear Blast	
24 October	The Luck and Strange Concerts	David Gilmour	Sony	
31 October	The End	Mammoth	BMG	
7 November	Classics Vol. 1	The Rock Orchestra	Mega Label	
14 November	Aeons	Esprit D'Air	Starstorm	
21 November	This Place Will Become Your Tomb	Sleep Token	Spinefarm	
28 November	One More Time	Aerosmith and Yungblud	Island	
5 December	Live After Death	Iron Maiden	EMI	
12 December	Nevermind	Nirvana	DGC	
19 December	Wish You Were Here	Pink Floyd	Harvest	
26 December	Wish You Were Here	Pink Floyd	Harvest	

== See also ==
- List of UK Rock & Metal Singles Chart number ones of 2025
